= Timeline of Newark, New Jersey =

History of Newark, New Jersey, US by century

Coordinates: 40.724°N 74.173°W

The following is a timeline of the history of the city of Newark, New Jersey, United States.

== Before 1800 ==
- 1666 - Robert Treat and other Puritans buy land from Hackensack tribe.
- 1710s - Sydenham House and Plume House (residences) built (approximate date).
- 1712 - Harrison Cider Apple created (approximate date).
- 1726 - College of New Jersey founded.
- 1730 - Presbyterianism superseded Congregationalism.
- 1743 - Trinity Church built.
- 1756 - Princeton College relocated from Newark to Princeton.
- 1770 - One tannery operated.
- 1774 - Newark Academy established.
- 1780 - January 25: Elizabethtown and Newark Raid by British forces.
- 1787 - First Presbyterian Church built.
- 1791 - Woods's Newark Gazette begins publication.
- 1795 - Newark Plank Road to Bergen constructed (approximate date).
- 1797 - Newark Fire Association founded.
- 1798 - Three tanneries operating.

== 1800s ==
- 1803 - Newark Female Charitable Society founded.
- 1810 - Weller's Circulating Library in business (approximate date).
- 1814 - Newark Bible Society founded.
- 1817 - Newark Colonization Society founded.
- 1819 - Whybrew Circulating Library in business (approximate date).
- 1823 - Smith & Wright saddlery in business (approximate date).
- 1830 - Population: 10,953.
- 1831 - Plane Street Church organized.
- 1832 - Newark Daily Advertiser newspaper begins publication.
- 1834 - Centre Street Bridge opens.
- 1836 - Newark incorporated as a city.
- 1837 - 155 curriers and patent leather makers in the city.
- 1840
  - Patterson & Ballantine Brewing Company in business.
  - Population: 17,290.
- 1844 - Mount Pleasant Cemetery established.
- 1846 - New Jersey Historical Society headquartered in Newark.
- 1847 - Library Association founded.
- 1848 - Influx of Germans.
- 1849 - Newark Daily Mercury newspaper begins publication.
- 1850
  - Bethel Mission established.
  - Population: 38,894.
- 1853 - Newark Daily Eagle newspaper begins publication.
- 1857
  - City police department established.
  - Newark Orphan Asylum built.
  - City charter.
- 1858
  - New Jersey Freie Zeitung German-language newspaper begins publication.
  - Gottfried Krueger Brewing Company in business.
- 1860 - Population: 71,941.
- 1864 - Lyon & Son's brewing company in business.
- 1865 - Murphy Varnish Company in business.
- 1869
  - Newark and New York Railroad begins operating.
  - Newark City Cemetery in use.
  - Newark Morning Register newspaper begins publication.
- 1870 - Bee Hive dry goods shop in business (later Plaut & Co.)
- 1872 - Newark Industrial Exposition begins.
- 1874 - St. Stephen's Church built.
- 1875 - Marshall & Ball clothing shop in business.
- 1879 - Newark City Brewery in business.
- 1880 - Newark Tribüne German-language newspaper begins publication.
- 1881 - Newark Technical School established.
- 1883 - Balbach electrolytic refinery opens.
- 1884 - Prince Street Synagogue built.
- 1885
  - Johnston & Murphy and Lutz Cafe in business.
  - 1885 American Cup soccer tournament held.
- 1886 - Miner's Newark Theater opens.
- 1888 - First Baptist Peddie Memorial Church built.
- 1889
  - Newark Free Public Library opens.
  - Jersey City, Newark and Western Railway incorporated.
- 1890 - Population: 181,830.
- 1893 - L. Bamberger & Company in business.
- 1894
  - Sacred Heart of Jesus Church built.
  - Montagna Italian-language newspaper begins publication.
- 1895 - Branch Brook Park established.
- 1899 - Cathedral Basilica of the Sacred Heart construction begins.

== 1900s ==
=== 1900-1909 ===
- 1900 - Population: 246,070.
- 1901
  - Beth Israel Hospital founded.
  - Newark Free Public Library opens its current location.
- 1902 - Newark City Hall opened.
- 1903
  - Jackson Street Bridge and Clay Street Bridge open.
  - Roseville railroad station built.
  - Newark trolley accident kills 8 students
- 1905
  - La Revista Italian/English-language newspaper begins publication.
  - Feigenspan mansion built.
  - Automobile Renting Co. in business.
- 1906
  - Trees planted in Pequannock Watershed.
  - Literary Stratemeyer Syndicate active.
- 1907 - Essex County Courthouse built.
- 1908
  - Kronika Polish/English-language newspaper begins publication.
  - St. Casimir's Church founded.
- 1909 - Newark Museum established.

=== 1910s ===
- 1910
  - Fire on High Street (now Martin Luther King Blvd) at factory kills 26
  - Population: 347,469.
- 1911 - Shubert Theatre opens.
- 1912
  - Adams Theatre and Empire Theatre built.
  - Equestrian statue of George Washington by J. Massey Rhind dedicated in Washington Park
- 1913
  - Bridge Street Bridge opens.
  - Moorish Science Temple of America headquartered in Newark.
- 1914 - New Jersey Observer begins publication.
- 1916
  - Robert Treat Hotel in business.
  - Military Park first opened.
- 1917 - Urban League founded.

=== 1920s ===
- 1920 - Carrier air conditioning plant begins operating.
- 1921 - Newark Morgen-Steren Yiddish/English-language newspaper begins publication.
- 1922 - New Jersey Symphony Orchestra headquartered in city.
- 1925
  - Shriners Salaam Temple built.
  - Newark Schools Stadium opens.
- 1926 - Central Railroad of New Jersey Newark Bay Bridge and Davids' Stadium open.
- 1927 - Stanley Theater opened.
- 1928
  - Newark Airport begins operating.
  - New Jersey Luso-Americano Portuguese-language newspaper begins publication (approximate date).

=== 1930s ===
- 1930 - Lefcourt building constructed.
- 1931
  - Italian Tribune begins publication.
  - National Newark building opens.
- 1935
  - Newark City Subway begins operating.
  - Newark Penn Station dedicated.
- 1936 - University of Newark established.
- 1939 - Newark Hot Club formed (music club).

=== 1940s and 1950s ===
- 1942
  - Savoy Records founded.
  - Hydeaway Bar in business.
- 1949 - After Hours magazine begins publication.
- 1954 - Cathedral Basilica of the Sacred Heart consecrated.
- 1958 - September 15: Newark Bay rail accident.

=== 1960s ===
- 1960 - Population: 405,000.
- 1962 - Youth Career Development Center initiated.
- 1964 - Newark Symphony Hall established.
- 1966 - New Jersey Symphony Boys Choir founded.
- 1967
  - July 12–17: 1967 Newark riots occur.
  - July 20: Black power conference held in city.
- 1969 - Ironbound Community Corporation and New Community Corporation founded.

=== 1970s ===
- 1970 - Kenneth Gibson becomes first African American mayor on the eastern seaboard.
- 1971 - Gateway Center built.
- 1977 - City hosts first Islamic Conference of North America.
- 1978 - August 20: Clinton Avenue Five boys disappear.
- 1979 - Foreign trade zone established.

=== 1980s ===
- 1984 - Former Diamond Alkali plant site in Ironbound declared a Superfund site (polluted area).
- 1986 - Sharpe James becomes mayor.
- 1989
  - Donald M. Payne becomes U.S. representative for New Jersey's 10th congressional district.
  - Sister city relationship established with Aveiro, Portugal.

=== 1990s ===
- 1990 - Population: 275,221.
- 1991 - Sister city relationship established with Banjul, Gambia.
- 1992
  - One Newark Center and Penn Plaza East building constructed.
  - Sister city relationship established with Xuzhou, Jiangsu, China.
- 1995 - Society Hill condo built.
- 1997
  - City website online.
  - New Jersey Performing Arts Center opens.
- 1999 - Bears Stadium opens.

== 2000s ==
=== 2000-2009 ===
- 2000
  - Newark Legal Center built.
  - Population: 273,546.
- 2002 - City's "Open Public Records Act Office" established.
- 2003 - May 11: Murder of Sakia Gunn.
- 2006
  - Cory Booker becomes mayor.
  - Garden State Rollergirls headquartered in city.
- 2007
  - Jewish Museum of New Jersey opens.
  - Prudential Center built.

=== 2010s ===
- 2010
  - Newark Archives Project begins.
  - Population: 277,140; metro 18,897,109.
- 2013 - November 4: Luis A. Quintana becomes interim mayor.
- 2014 - Ras Baraka becomes mayor.

== See also ==
- History of Newark, New Jersey
- National Register of Historic Places listings in Essex County, New Jersey
- List of Mayors of Newark, New Jersey
- Timeline of Jersey City, New Jersey
- Timeline of New Jersey

== Bibliography ==
=== Published in 19th century ===
==== 1800s-1840s ====
- Jedidiah Morse; Richard C. Morse (1823), "Newark", A New Universal Gazetteer (4th ed.), New Haven: S. Converse
- "Newark", American Advertising Directory, for Manufacturers and Dealers in American Goods, New York: Jocelyn, Darling & Co., 1831, OCLC 1018684
- Thomas Francis Gordon (1834), "Newark", Gazetteer of the State of New Jersey, Trenton: Daniel Fenton, OCLC 4366560
- Directory of Newark, for 1835-6, Newark, N.J.: Office of the Newark Daily Advertiser, 1835, OL 23673568M
- Directory of the City of Newark, for 1838-9, Newark, N.J.: Pierson, 1838, OL 23295513M

==== 1850s-1890s ====
- B.T. Pierson (1851), Directory of the City of Newark, for 1851-52, Newark, N.J.: Holbrook's Steam Press, OL 7137264M
- City Charter and Ordinances of the City of Newark. Daily Advertiser. 1858.
- Hand book and guide for the city of Newark, New Jersey, Newark: Newark daily advertiser print, 1872, OL 24158393M
- William F. Ford (1874), The industrial interests of Newark, N. J, New York: Van Arsdale & Company, OCLC 7369689, OL 6904305M
- "Newark", Goulding's Business Directory of New York, Brooklyn, Newark, Paterson, Jersey City, and Hoboken, Lawrence G. Gulding, 1875
- Martha J. Lamb, "Newark," Harper's New Monthly 53 (October 1876): 671–672.
- Newark, N. J. (1877). City Charter and Supplements Thereto of the City of Newark.
- Joseph Atkinson (1878), The History of Newark, New Jersey, Newark, N.J.: W.B. Guild, OCLC 1247333, OL 6904304M
- George Ripley; Charles A. Dana, eds. (1879). "Newark". The American Cyclopaedia (2nd ed.). New York: D. Appleton and Company.
- Joseph Sabin, ed. (1881). "Newark, N.J.". Bibliotheca Americana. Vol. 13. New York. OCLC 13972268.
- William H. Shaw (1884), "City of Newark (etc.)", History of Essex and Hudson Counties, New Jersey, Philadelphia: Everts & Peck
- "Newark (2.)" . Encyclopædia Britannica. Vol. 17 (9th ed.). 1884. pp. 370–371.
- Terence Devine (1886), Devine's Newark City Street Guide, Newark, N.J., OL 17940766M
- "Newark Department", Business Directory of New York City, and Newark City, N.J., American Reporter Co., 1886
- F. Killenberger (1887), "Newark", F. Killenberger's Pocket Gazetteer of the State of New Jersey, New Brunswick: New Jersey Pub. Co.
- "Newark". Quarter-Century's Progress of New Jersey's Leading Manufacturing Centres. NY: International Publishing Company. 1887.
- "Business Directory of Newark City, NJ", Business Directory of New York, Brooklyn, and Newark, H.A. Curtin, 1888 + 1889 ed.
- Newark and its leading businessmen, Newark, N.J.: Mercantile Publishing Co., 1891, OCLC 13695297, OL 24332537M
- Peter J. Leary (1893), Newark, N.J., illustrated, Newark, N.J.: W.A. Baker, OL 17940499M
- Biographical and Genealogical History of the City of Newark and Essex County, New Jersey, New York and Chicago: Lewis Publishing Company, 1898, OL 17996898M
- The 'Guide Book' Street Guide and General Information of Newark, Newark, N.J.: Cities Map & Guide Co., 1900, OL 23698396M

=== Published in 20th century ===
==== 1900s-1940s ====
- Frank Pierce Hill; Varnum Lansing Collins (1902), Books, pamphlets and newspapers printed at Newark, New Jersey, 1776-1900, Newark, OL 7059947M
- Herbert L. Thowless (1902), Historical Sketch of the City of Newark, New Jersey, Newark, OL 17940595M
- "Newark". Brockhaus' Konversations-Lexikon (in German) (14th ed.). Leipzig: Brockhaus. 1908.
- "Newark (New Jersey)" . Encyclopædia Britannica. Vol. 19 (11th ed.). 1910.
- Newark in the public schools of Newark: A course of study on Newark, its geography, civics and history, Newark: Board of Education, 1911, OL 6560916M
- Newark, the City of Industry: Facts and Figures Concerning the Metropolis of New Jersey, 1912, Newark Board of Trade, 1912, OL 17940508M
- Directory, Newark Made Goods: Newark Manufacturers, Alphabetically Arranged in English, French, and Spanish. Newark Board of Trade. 1913.
- Frank John Urquhart (1913), History of the City of Newark, New Jersey, New York: Lewis Historical Publishing Co., OCLC 7981444. v.1, v.2, v.3
- Arthur Fremont Rider (1916), "Newark", Rider's New York City and Vicinity, including Newark, Yonkers and Jersey City, New York: H. Holt and Company
- Official Guide and Manual of the 250th Anniversary Celebration of the Founding of Newark, New Jersey, 1666-1916. 1916.
- Historic Newark: a Collection of Facts and Traditions about the Most Interesting Sites, Streets and Buildings of That City, Newark, N.J.: Fidelity Trust Company, 1916, OCLC 27101481, OL 6588031M
- Newark's anniversary industrial exposition in celebrating of the 250th anniversary of the settlement of Newark, New Jersey, Paterson, NJ: J.J. Scannell, 1916, OL 17940585M
- Frank John Urquhart (1916), A Short History of Newark, Newark, N.J.: Baker Printing Co., OCLC 3050302, OL 6587251M
- "Newark, Essex County". Industrial Directory of New Jersey. Paterson NJ. 1918.
- Federal Writers' Project (1946). "Newark". New Jersey: a Guide to its Present and Past. American Guide Series. NY: Hastings House. hdl:2027/mdp.39015010421512.
- John M. Heilman (1947). "Forest Management for Newark". Journal (American Water Works Association). 39 (1): 87–92. Bibcode:1947JAWWA..39a..87H. doi:10.1002/j.1551-8833.1947.tb17682.x. JSTOR 23349329.

==== 1950s-1990s ====
- Howard A. Palley (Spring 1967). "Community Action, Public Programs and Youth Unemployment: A Case Study of Newark, New Jersey". Journal of Negro Education. 36 (2): 100–110. doi:10.2307/2293885. JSTOR 2293885.
- Carl-Gunnar Janson (1968). "The Spatial Structure of Newark, New Jersey, Part I, the Central City". Acta Sociologica. 11 (3): 144–169. doi:10.1177/000169936801100302. JSTOR 4193673. S2CID 146727783.
- Arnold S. Rice (1977), Howard B. Furer (ed.), Newark: a chronological & documentary history, 1666-1970, American Cities Chronology Series, Dobbs Ferry, N.Y.: Oceana Publications, ISBN 0379006081
- Galishoff, Stuart. Newark: the nation's unhealthiest city, 1832-1895 (1988). online
  - Galishoff, " Public health in Newark, 1832-1918" (PhD Dissertation, New York University; ProQuest Dissertations & Theses, 1969. 7017269).

=== Published in 21st century ===
- "History of Newark". A Walk Through Newark. NY: Educational Broadcasting Corporation. 2002.
- Barbara J. Kukla (2002), Swing City: Newark Nightlife, 1925-50, Rutgers University Press, ISBN 9780813531168
- "Newark". Understanding Slums: Case Studies for the Global Report 2003. United Nations Human Settlements Programme and University College London. 2003.
- Kathe Newman (2004). "Newark, Decline and Avoidance, Renaissance and Desire: From Disinvestment to Reinvestment". Annals of the American Academy of Political and Social Science. 594: 34–48. doi:10.1177/0002716204264963. JSTOR 4127692. S2CID 154358268.
- Kevin Mumford (2007), Newark: A History of Race, Rights, and Riots in America, NYU Press, ISBN 9780814757178
- Brad R. Tuttle (2009), How Newark became Newark: the rise, fall, and rebirth of an American city, New Brunswick, N.J: Rutgers University Press, ISBN 9780813544908
- Ezra Shales (2010), Made in Newark: industrial arts and civic identity in the progressive era, New Brunswick, N.J.: Rutgers University Press, OCLC 436387175
