= History of Newark, New Jersey =

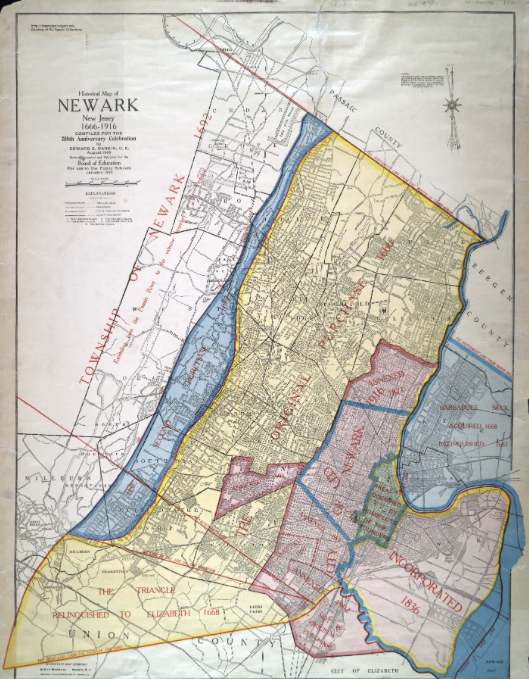
Map of Newark 1666-1916 compiled to celebrate the 250th anniversary of the city's founding

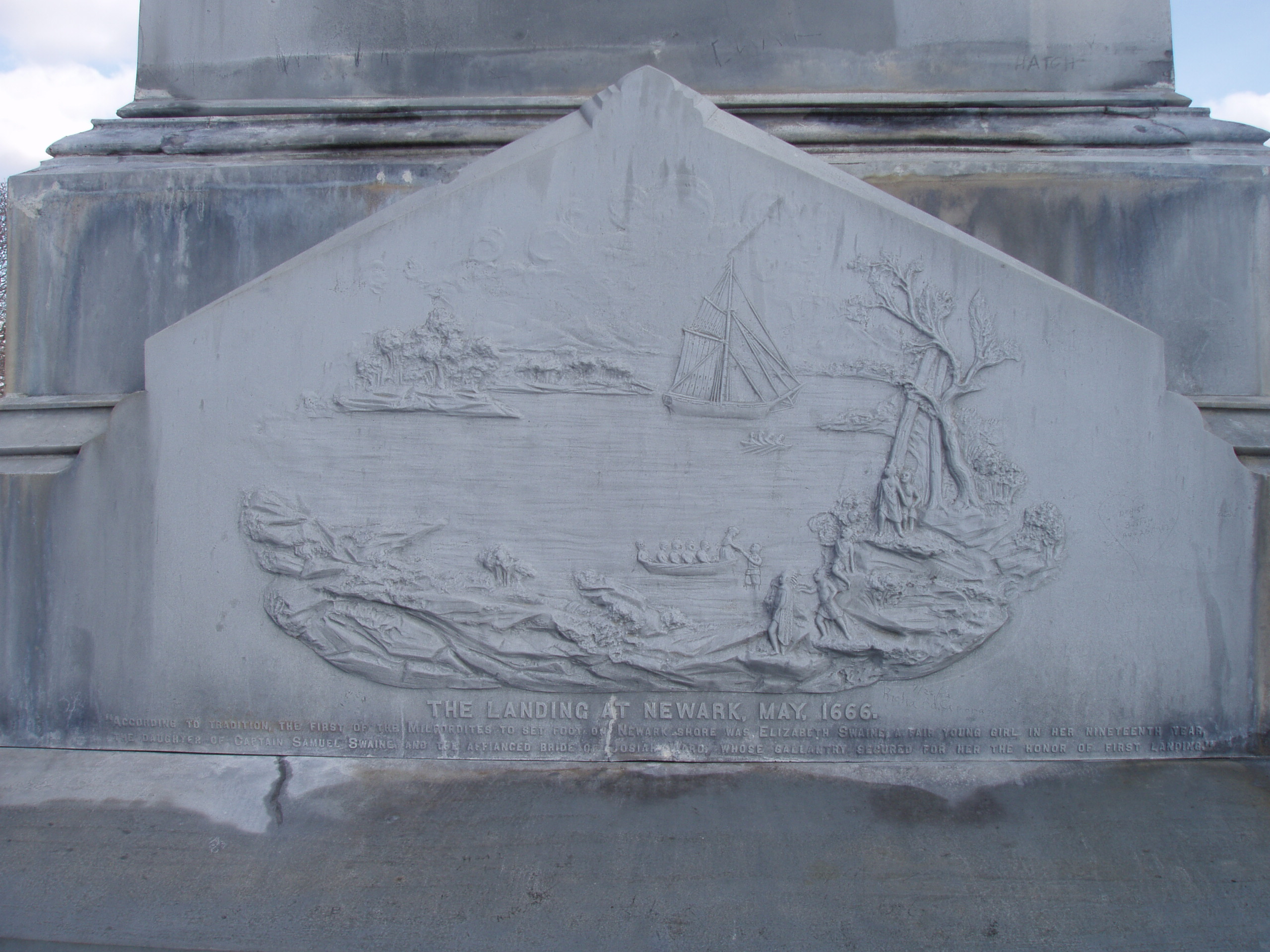
The landing of the Puritans in 1666, from the Settlers' Monument, Fairmount Cemetery

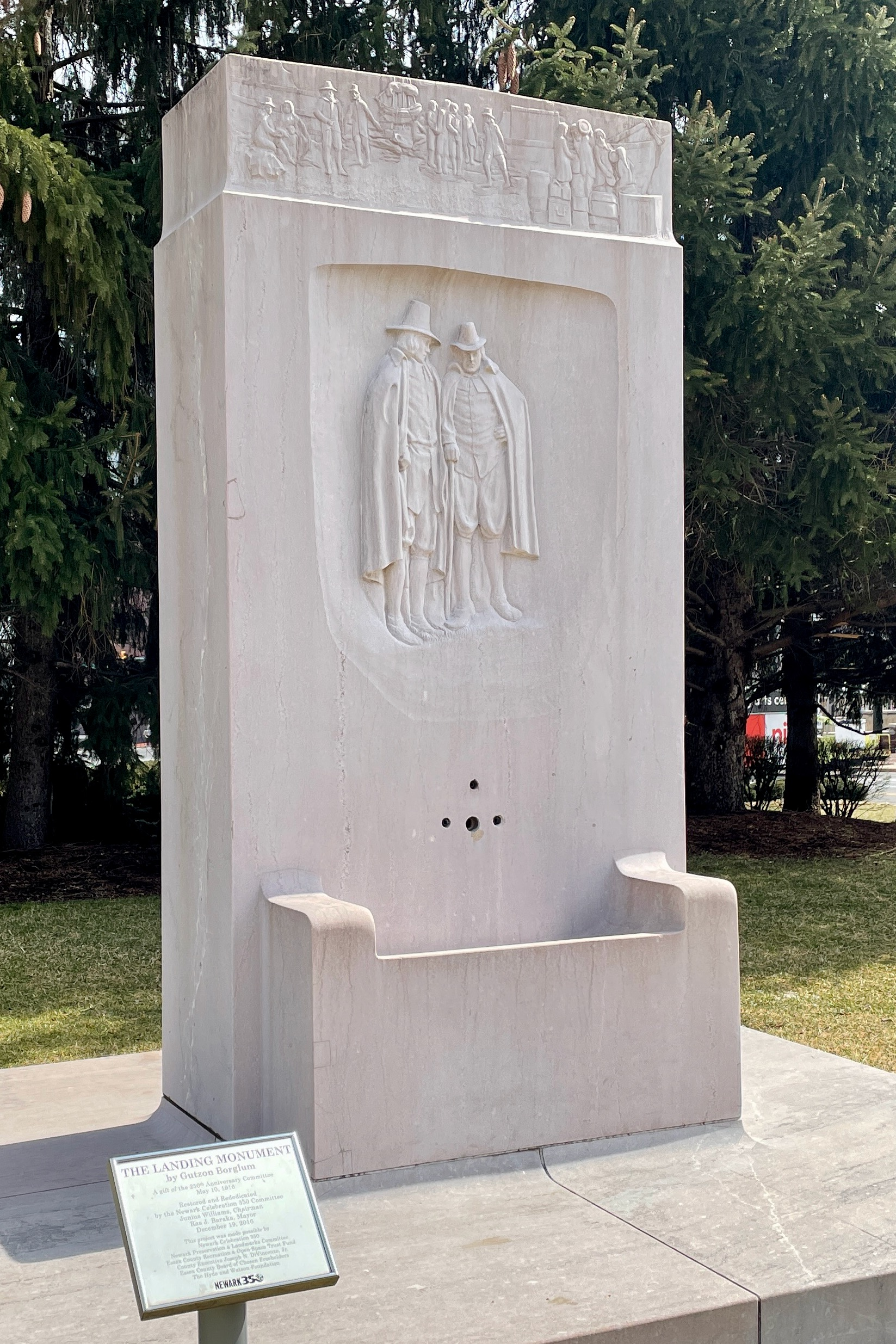
First Landing Party of the Founders of Newark, by Gutzon Borglum, 1916

Newark has long been the largest city in New Jersey. Founded in 1666, it greatly expanded during the Industrial Revolution, becoming the commercial and cultural hub of the region. Its population grew with various waves of migration in the mid-19th century, peaking in 1950. It suffered greatly during the era of urban decline and suburbanization in the late 20th century. Since the millennium it has benefited from interest and re-investment in America's cities, recording population growth in the 2010 and 2020 censuses.

== Founding and 18th century ==
Newark was originally founded in 1666 by Connecticut Puritans led by Robert Treat from the New Haven Colony to avoid losing political power to others not of their own church after the union of the Connecticut and New Haven colonies. Treat had scouted several other locations before reaching an agreement with Governor George Carteret. The site for Newark was chosen because the Puritans wanted an isolated location that was remote and protected from outside influence. It was the third settlement founded in New Jersey, after Bergen, New Netherland (later dissolved into Hudson County, then incorporated into Jersey City) and Elizabethtown (modern-day Elizabeth), the first state capital.

They sought to establish a theocratic colony with strict church rules similar to the one they had established in Milford, Connecticut. The settlement was originally called "Pesayak Towne," but Treat wanted to name the community "Milford." Another settler, Abraham Pierson, had previously been a preacher in England's Newark-on-Trent, and adopted the name; he is also quoted as saying that the community reflecting the new task at hand should be named "New Ark" for "New Ark of the Covenant." The name was shortened to Newark. References to the name "New Ark" are found in preserved letters written by historical figures such as James McHenry dated as late as 1787.

Treat and the party bought the property on the Passaic River from the Hackensack Indians by exchanging gunpowder, 100 bars of lead, 20 axes, 20 coats, guns, pistols, swords, kettles, blankets, knives, beer, and ten pairs of breeches.

Following the Treaty of Westminster, New Jersey split into East Jersey and West Jersey. From 1674 to 1702, Newark was part of East Jersey and became a town in Essex County on March 7, 1683, one of the four newly independent counties in East Jersey. On October 31, 1693, Newark was organized as a New Jersey township based on the Newark Tract, which was first purchased on July 11, 1667, encompassing most of modern Essex County. In 1702, New Jersey was reunified and became a royal colony. In 1710, by royal decree of Queen Anne of Great Britain, neighboring Bergen County was enlarged to include land on New Barbadoes Neck that had been a part of Essex County.

Newark was granted a royal charter on April 27, 1713. It was incorporated on February 21, 1798, by the New Jersey Legislature's Township Act of 1798, as one of New Jersey's initial group of 104 townships. During its time as a township, Newark lost significant acreage with two-thirds of its land annexed to form Springfield Township (April 14, 1794), Caldwell Township (February 16, 1798; now known as Fairfield Township), Orange Township (November 27, 1806), Bloomfield Township (March 23, 1812) and Clinton Township (April 14, 1834, remainder reabsorbed by Newark on March 5, 1902).

The first four settlers built houses at what is now the intersection of Broad Street and Market Street, also known as "Four Corners."

The total control of the community by the Puritan Church continued until 1733 when Josiah Ogden harvested wheat on a Sunday following a lengthy rainstorm and was disciplined by the Church for Sabbath breaking. He left the church and corresponded with Episcopalian missionaries, who arrived to build a church in 1746 and broke up the Puritan theocracy.

It took 70 years to eliminate the last vestiges of theocracy from Newark, when the right to hold office was finally granted to non-Protestants.

First Landing Party of the Founders of Newark (1916) and Indian and the Puritan (1916) are two of four public art works created by Gutzon Borglum that are located in Newark commemorating the city's founding.

In 1747, the College of New Jersey moved from Elizabeth to Newark following the death of school's first president, Jonathan Dickinson. The move to Newark was facilitated by Aaron Burr Sr., the successor to Mr. Dickinson, as his parsonage was located in town. In 1756, the school moved to Princeton, where it would become Princeton University, because Newark was felt to be too close to New York.

=== American Revolution ===
During Washington's retreat across New Jersey, General Washington and the Continental Army made camp at Military Park in Newark and General Washington made his headquarters at Eagle Tavern on Broad Street from November 22 to 28, 1776.

On the night of January 25, 1780, British troops used sleighs to cross a frozen Hudson River from Manhattan to Paulus Hook and marched through Bergen to raid Newark. They burned down Newark Academy, which was being used as barracks to house Continental Army soldiers, ransacked neighboring homes and killed several people. Over thirty people were captured and taken prisoner back to Manhattan by the British.

== Industrial era to 1900 ==
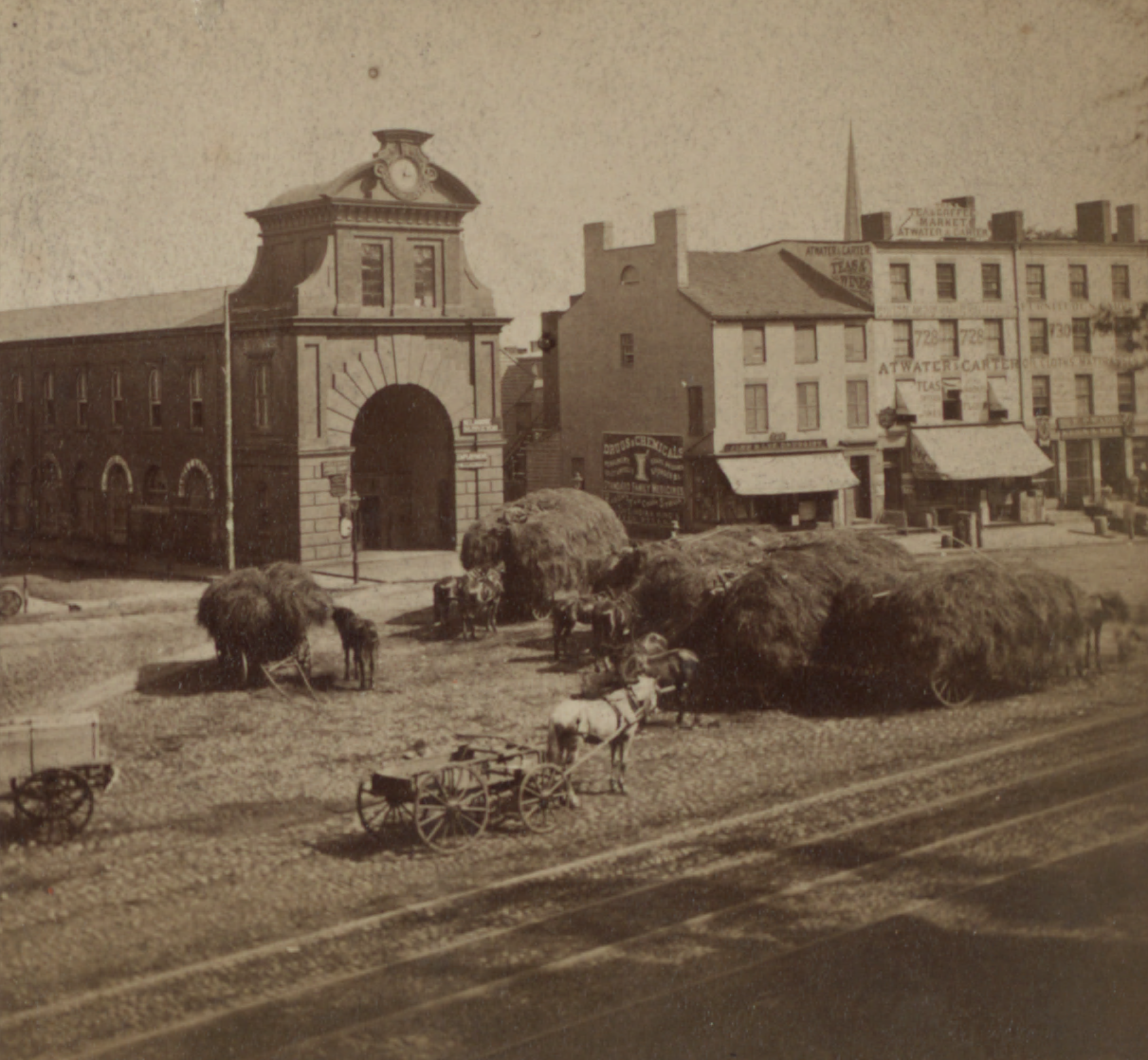
View of Centre Market, ca. 1870

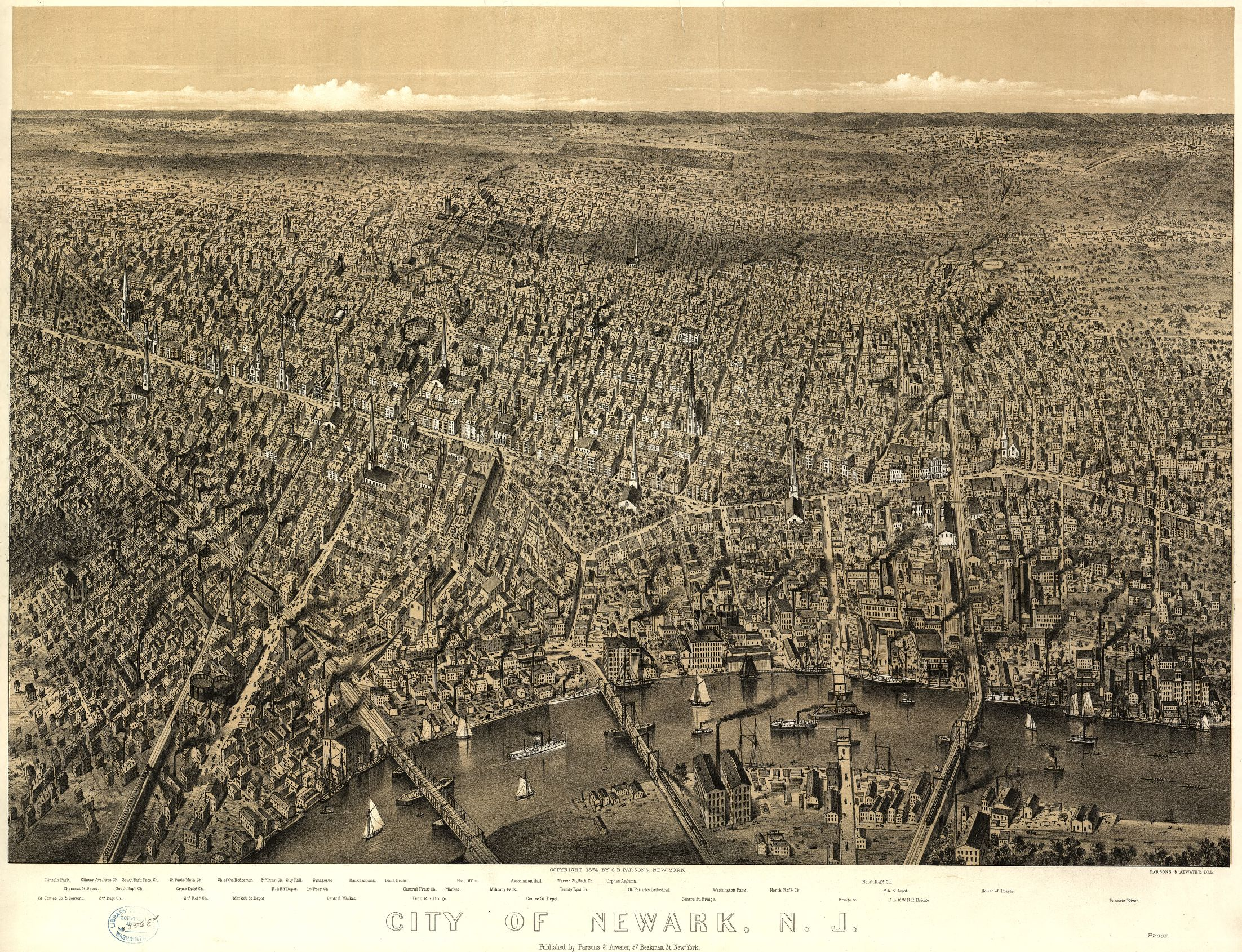
1874 bird's-eye view of Newark

Newark's rapid growth began in the early 19th century, much of it due to a Massachusetts transplant named Seth Boyden. Boyden came to Newark in 1815 and immediately began a torrent of improvements to leather manufacture, culminating in the process for making patent leather. Boyden's genius led to Newark's manufacturing nearly 90% of the nation's leather by 1870, bringing in $8.6 million in revenue to the city in that year alone. In 1824, Boyden, bored with leather, found a way to produce malleable iron. Newark also prospered by the construction of the Morris Canal in 1831. The canal connected Newark with the New Jersey hinterland, at that time a major iron and farm area.

By 1826, Newark's population stood at 8,017, ten times the 1776 number. Railroads arrived in 1834 and 1835 along with a flourishing shipping business that helped Newark became the area's industrial center. On April 11, 1836, Newark was reincorporated as a city replacing Newark Township based on the results of a referendum passed on March 18, 1836.

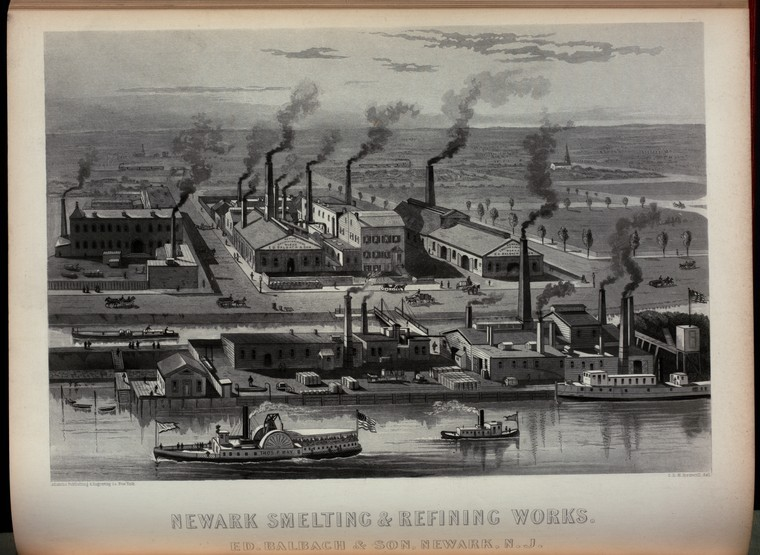
Balbach Smelting and Refining Company ca. 1870. Now the location of baseball fields at Riverbank Park.

The middle 19th century saw continued growth and diversification of Newark's industrial base. The first commercially successful plastic — Celluloid — was produced in a factory on Mechanic Street by John Wesley Hyatt. Hyatt's Celluloid found its way into Newark-made carriages, billiard balls, and dentures. Dr. Edward Weston perfected a process for zinc electroplating, as well as a superior arc lamp at the Weston Electric Light Company in Newark. As a result, the city's Military Park had the first public electric lamps anywhere in the United States. Before moving to Menlo Park in 1876, Thomas Edison made Newark his home in the early 1870s where he developed the Universal Stock Ticker which was one of the earliest practical stock ticker machines.

Newark's industry continued to expand in the late 19th century, leading local industrialists to support the opening of Newark Technical School in 1885. From the mid-century on, numerous Irish and German immigrants moved to the city. The Germans were primarily refugees from the revolutions of 1848, and, as other groups later did, established their own ethnic enterprises, such as newspapers and breweries. However, tensions existed between the "native stock" and the newer groups.

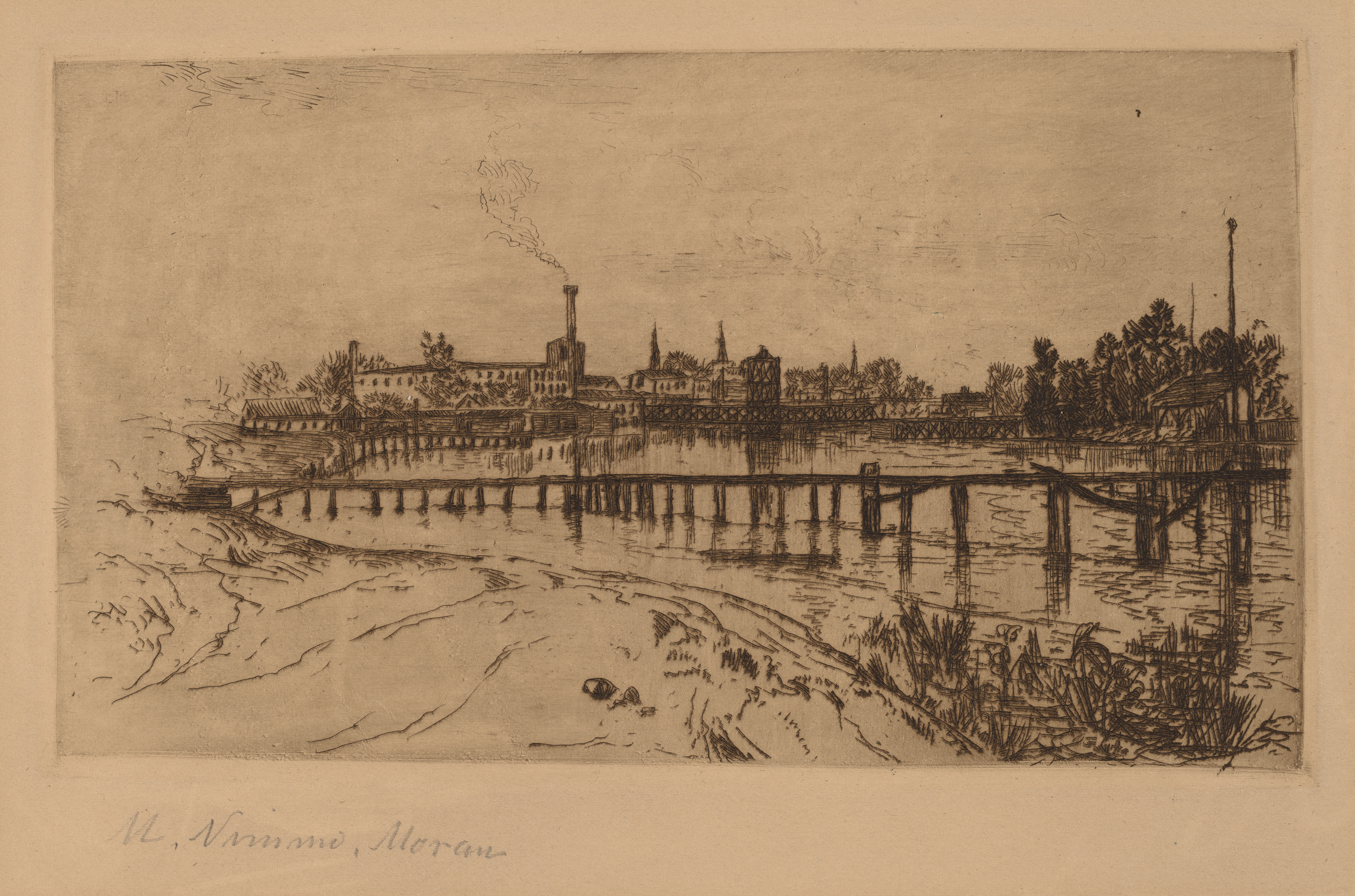
Mary Nimmo Moran, Newark, N.J., from the Passaic, 1879, National Gallery of Art

In the middle 19th century, Newark added insurance to its repertoire of businesses; Mutual Benefit was founded in the city in 1845 and Prudential in 1873. Prudential, or "the Pru" as generations knew it, was founded by another transplanted New Englander, John Fairfield Dryden. He found a niche catering to the middle and lower classes. In the late 1880s, companies based in Newark sold more insurance than those in any city except Hartford, Connecticut.

By 1860, Newark had grown to be the eleventh largest city in the United States and the country's largest industrial-based city.

In 1867, the designers of New York's Central Park, Frederick Law Olmsted and Calvert Vaux, had been asked by the Newark Park Commission, created by the New Jersey State Legislature, for their recommendations on sites in Newark to create a "central park" for the city. In October 1867, they presented a report on a site adjacent to Old Blue Jay Swamp as the best location for the park. However, the state legislature denied the $1 million required to acquire and improve the land. The idea for a park was scuttled until Essex County spearheaded the project 28 years later. By the time Branch Brook Park was built in 1895 as the first county park in the United States, only a third of the original 700 acres (280 ha) that were envisioned were available for twice the cost. Prior to Branch Brook Park, almost no land in Newark was preserved for park space with the exception of the Downtown colonial era commons at Military Park, Washington Park and Lincoln Park. Even in these limited park spaces, Newark did not provide basic amenities such as benches or water fountains that were often found in parks in other cities.

Sanitary conditions were bad throughout urban America in the 19th century, but Newark had an especially bad reputation. The city lacked the bold leadership and imagination seen in other cities in addressing urban problems. For most of the 19th century, city leaders allowed the business elite and private interests to formulate civic policy and run public agencies in pursuit of unfettered growth and industrialization. This led to multiple issues such as a lack of any urban planning and park construction, the accumulation of human and horse waste build up on unpaved city streets, the over reliance on cesspools and wells followed by the city's inadequate, poorly designed and haphazardly constructed sewage system, and the unreliability and dubious quality of its water supply. Newark did not have a proper public medical center or hospital until 1882, relying on neighboring cities and private medical facilities for emergency care. By 1890, Newark had the highest rate of death for cities of over 100,000 people, led the nation in deaths by scarlet fever and had the highest rate of infant mortality in the United States. Newark also ranked in the top ten of cities for diseases such as croup, diphtheria, malaria, tuberculosis and typhoid fever. As a result, that year the United States Census Bureau declared Newark "The Nation's Unhealthiest City."

In 1889, to finally address the public health crisis, mayor Joseph E. Haynes (1884–1894) contracted with the East Jersey Water Company for $6 million to construct three reservoirs and several aqueducts on the Pequannock River capable of delivering 50 million gallons of water daily to the city. The reservoir system opened in May 1892 removing the city's water supply from the polluted Passaic River which led to a 70% decline in typhoid deaths.

In 1880, Newark's population stood at 136,500 in 1890 at 181,830; in 1900 at 246,070; and in 1910 at 347,000, a jump of 200,000 in three decades. As Newark's population approached a half million in the 1920s, the city's potential seemed limitless. In 1927, it was said with striking hubris:

Great is Newark's vitality. It is the red blood in its veins – this basic strength that is going to carry it over whatever hurdles it may encounter, enable it to recover from whatever losses it may suffer and battle its way to still higher achievement industrially and financially, making it eventually perhaps the greatest industrial center in the world."

== 1900-1945 ==
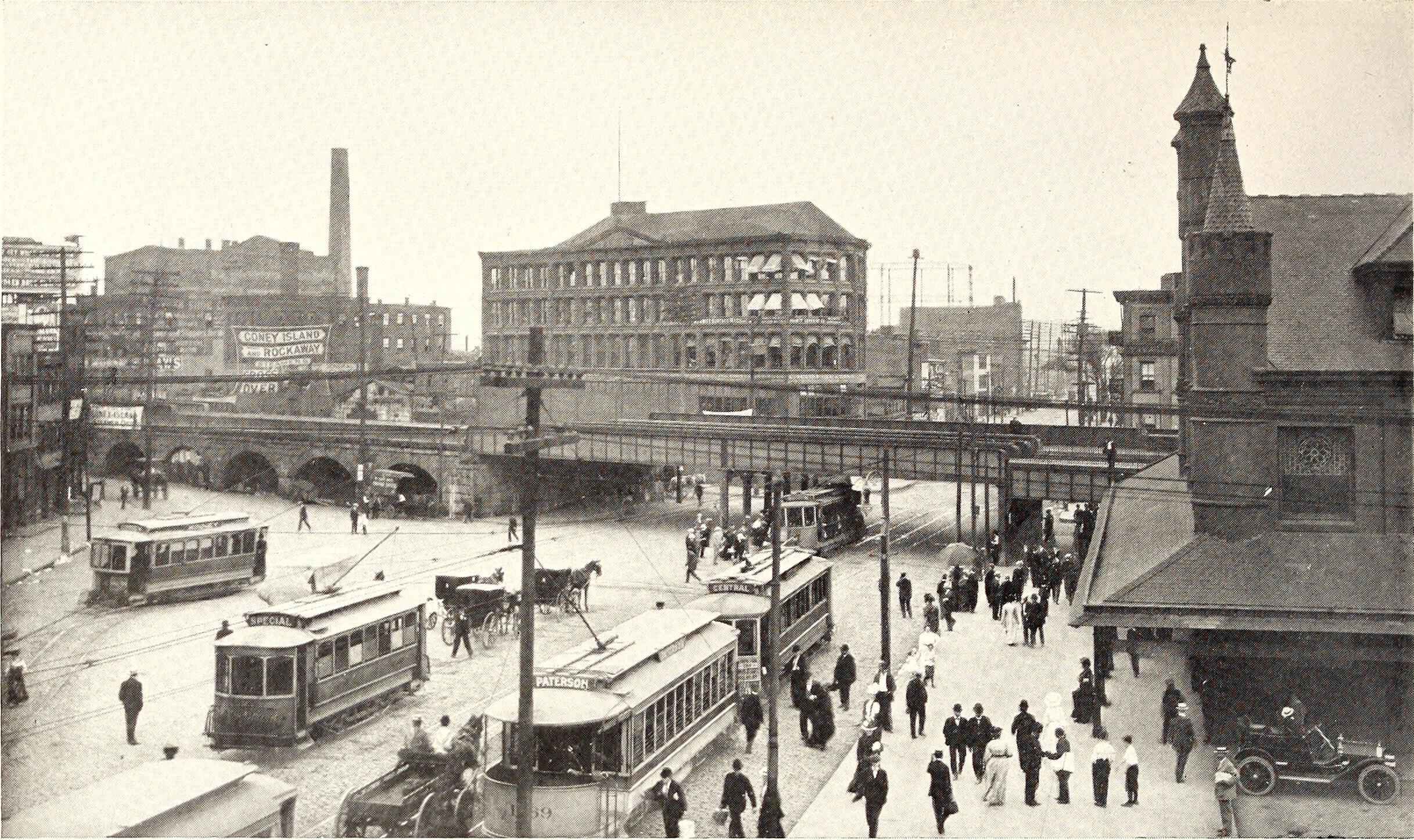
Newark's old Penn station, ca. 1911

Newark was bustling in its heyday of the early-to-mid-20th century with commerce, new construction and innovation. The Newark Public Library, founded in 1887, opened its main branch of the library in 1901. Newark City Hall and the Essex County Courthouse opened as two civic landmarks in 1902 and 1904 respectively. By 1910, Newark was the nation's 14th largest city. The Hudson and Manhattan Railroad (now PATH) reached the city in 1911 with opening of the Park Place station. Broad and Market Streets served as a center of retail commerce for the region, anchored by four flourishing department stores: Hahne & Company, Bambergers and Company, S. Klein and Kresge-Newark. "Broad Street today is the Mecca of visitors as it has been through all its long history," Newark merchants boasted, "they come in hundreds of thousands now when once they came in hundreds." Newark before the 20th century was described by visitors as "a prosperous but uninteresting city" because "New York is too conveniently near" providing little "encouragement from artists and actors." That sentiment changed after the turn of the century to the point that by 1922, Newark had 63 live theaters, 46 movie theaters, and an active nightlife. Oct. 23, 1935, mobster Dutch Schultz was killed at the Palace Chop House in one of the most notorious Mafia hits in American history.

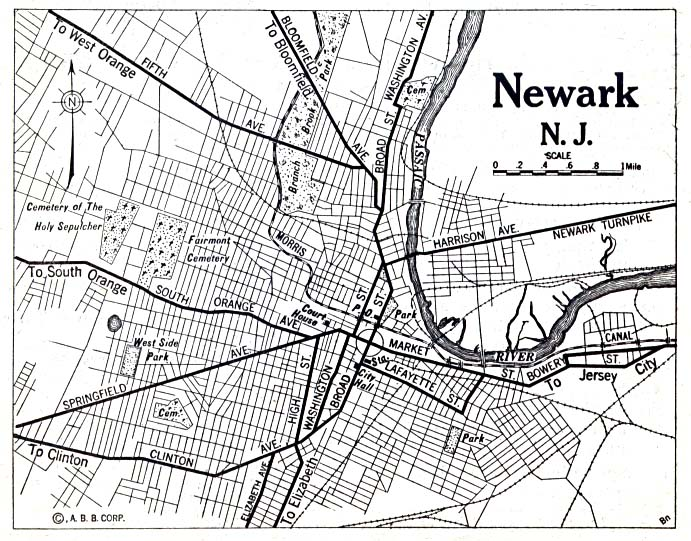
Map of Newark in 1920

By some measures, the intersection of Broad and Market Streets — known as the "Four Corners" — was the busiest intersection in the United States. In 1915, Public Service counted over 280,000 pedestrian crossings in one 13-hour period. Eleven years later, on October 26, 1926, a State Motor Vehicle Department check at the Four Corners counted 2,644 trolleys, 4,098 buses, 2,657 taxis, 3,474 commercial vehicles, and 23,571 automobiles. In 1932, the Pulaski Skyway opened providing motorists a direct link with Jersey City and then to Manhattan via the Holland Tunnel. By 1935, traffic in Newark had become so heavy that the city decided to convert the bed of the old Morris Canal into the Newark City Subway line. The subway–surface line was capped by a new road for auto traffic, Raymond Boulevard, and designed to reduce congestion in the Downtown area by directing the trolley lines into the subway via several street ramps that connected them to the newly re-built Newark Penn Station.

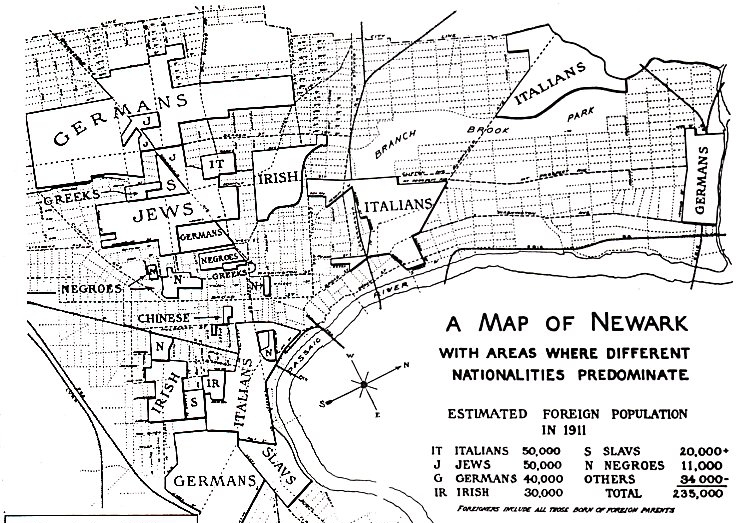
1910-era map of ethnic enclaves in Newark, New Jersey

Newark Airport opened in 1928 as the first major commercial airport to serve the New York metropolitan area, the first commercial airport in the United States and the first with a paved airstrip. Innovations continued at the airport when it became the site of the nation's first air traffic control tower and weather station in 1930 and the first passenger terminal in 1934. Amelia Earhart dedicated the Newark Metropolitan Airport Building in 1935. The airport was the first in the United States to allow nighttime operations when it installed runway lights in 1952.

New skyscrapers were being built every year with the two tallest in the city being the Art Deco National Newark Building built in 1931 and the Lefcourt-Newark Building built in 1930. The plaza behind the Lefcourt Building was the proposed site for a potential relocation of the New York Stock Exchange pitched by mayor Meyer C. Ellenstein (1933–1941) in 1933. The National Newark Building was the tallest in the state until it was surpassed by Exchange Place Center in Jersey City in 1989. In 1948, just after World War II, Newark hit its peak population of just under 450,000. The population also grew as immigrants from Southern and Eastern Europe settled there. Newark was the center of distinctive neighborhoods, including a large Eastern European Jewish community concentrated along Prince Street.

== Post-World War II era ==
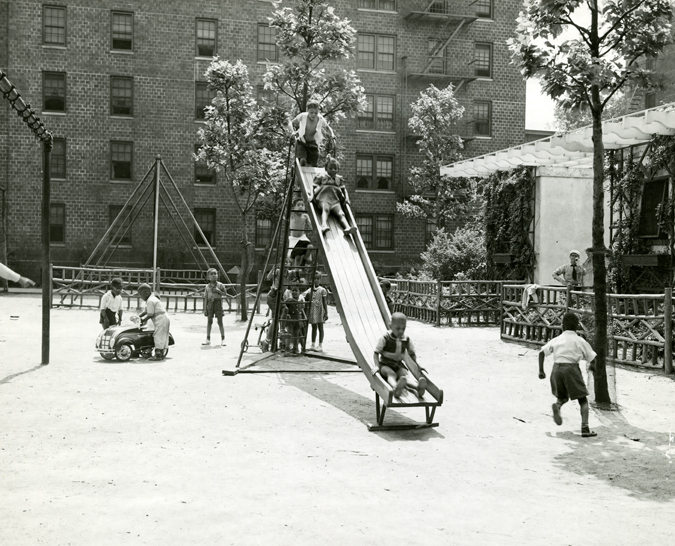
Children's Playground at Prudential Apartments, c.1940

While the city was prospering during the early 20th century, problems existed underneath the industrial hum. In 1930, a city commissioner told the Optimists, a local booster club:

Newark is not like the city of old. The old, quiet residential community is a thing of the past, and in its place has come a city teeming with activity. With the change has come something unfortunate—the large number of outstanding citizens who used to live within the community's boundaries has dwindled. Many of them have moved to the suburbs and their home interests are there.

While many observers attribute Newark’s decline to post-World War II forces, others argue the warning signs emerged earlier in the city’s shrinking budget. Newark’s revenues fell from $58 million in 1938 to just $45 million in 1944—a sharp drop even as the national economy was rebounding from the Great Depression and gearing up for World War II. Despite this broader boom, the city was forced to raise its tax rate from $4.61 to $5.30, a signal of deepening fiscal strain.

Some attribute Newark's downfall to its propensity for building large housing projects. Newark's housing had long been a matter of concern, as much of it was older. A 1944 city-commissioned study showed that 31% of all Newark dwelling units were below standards of health, and only 17% of Newark's units were owner-occupied. Additionally, a 1947 report showed one-third of all dwelling units needed major repairs and/or lacked private bathrooms or a water supply. Vast sections of Newark consisted of wooden tenements, and at least 5,000 units failed to meet thresholds of being a decent place to live. Bad housing was the cause of demands that government intervene in the housing market to improve conditions.

Historian Kenneth T. Jackson and others theorized that Newark, with a poor center surrounded by middle-class outlying areas, only did well when it was able to annex middle-class suburbs. When municipal annexation broke down, urban problems were exacerbated as the middle-class ring became divorced from the poor center. In 1900, mayor James M. Seymour (1896–1903), while arguing for the creation of "Greater Newark", confidently speculated, "East Orange, Vailsburg, Harrison, Kearny, and Belleville would be desirable acquisitions. By an exercise of discretion we can enlarge the city from decade to decade without unnecessarily taxing the property within our limits, which has already paid the cost of public improvements." Only Vailsburg would ever be added in 1905 giving the city its current boundaries. By 1910, Newark was the third smallest city by land area of the twenty most populous American cities.

Although numerous problems predated World War II, Newark was more hamstrung by a number of trends in the post-WWII era. The Federal Housing Administration redlined virtually all of Newark, preferring to back up mortgages in the white suburbs. This made it impossible for people to get mortgages for purchase or loans for improvements. Manufacturers set up in lower wage environments outside the city and received larger tax deductions for building new factories in outlying areas than for rehabilitating old factories in the city. Newark lost 250 manufacturers between 1950 and 1960 and another 1,300 more left during the 1960s. The federal tax structure essentially subsidized these inequities.

Marketed as transportation improvements, the construction of new highways: Interstate 280, the New Jersey Turnpike, Interstate 78 and the Garden State Parkway ultimately harmed Newark. The highways divided and carved through the fabric of neighborhoods by demolishing hundreds of homes and small businesses while displacing at least 5,000 residents. Additional neighborhood demolition followed in Downtown for the construction of parking lots. The highways also accelerated suburban flight by making it easier for middle-class residents—already leaving Newark since the 1920s—to live outside the city while working in it. During this time, the city planned to convert Halsey Street between Market Street and Harriet Tubman Square into a retail pedestrian plaza to bolster the retail anchors and smaller shops Downtown and limit automobile traffic, but it never came to fruition.

Despite its problems, Newark tried to remain vital in the postwar era. The city successfully persuaded Prudential and Mutual Benefit to stay and build new offices. Rutgers University-Newark and New Jersey Institute of Technology (NJIT) expanded their Newark presences, with the former building a brand-new campus on a 23-acre (9 ha) urban renewal site. Seton Hall University School of Law relocated from Jersey City to Newark in 1951 and graduated its first class in 1954. During the postwar era, the Port Authority of New York and New Jersey made Port Newark the first container port in the nation and took over operations at Newark Liberty International Airport, now the twelfth busiest airport in the United States.

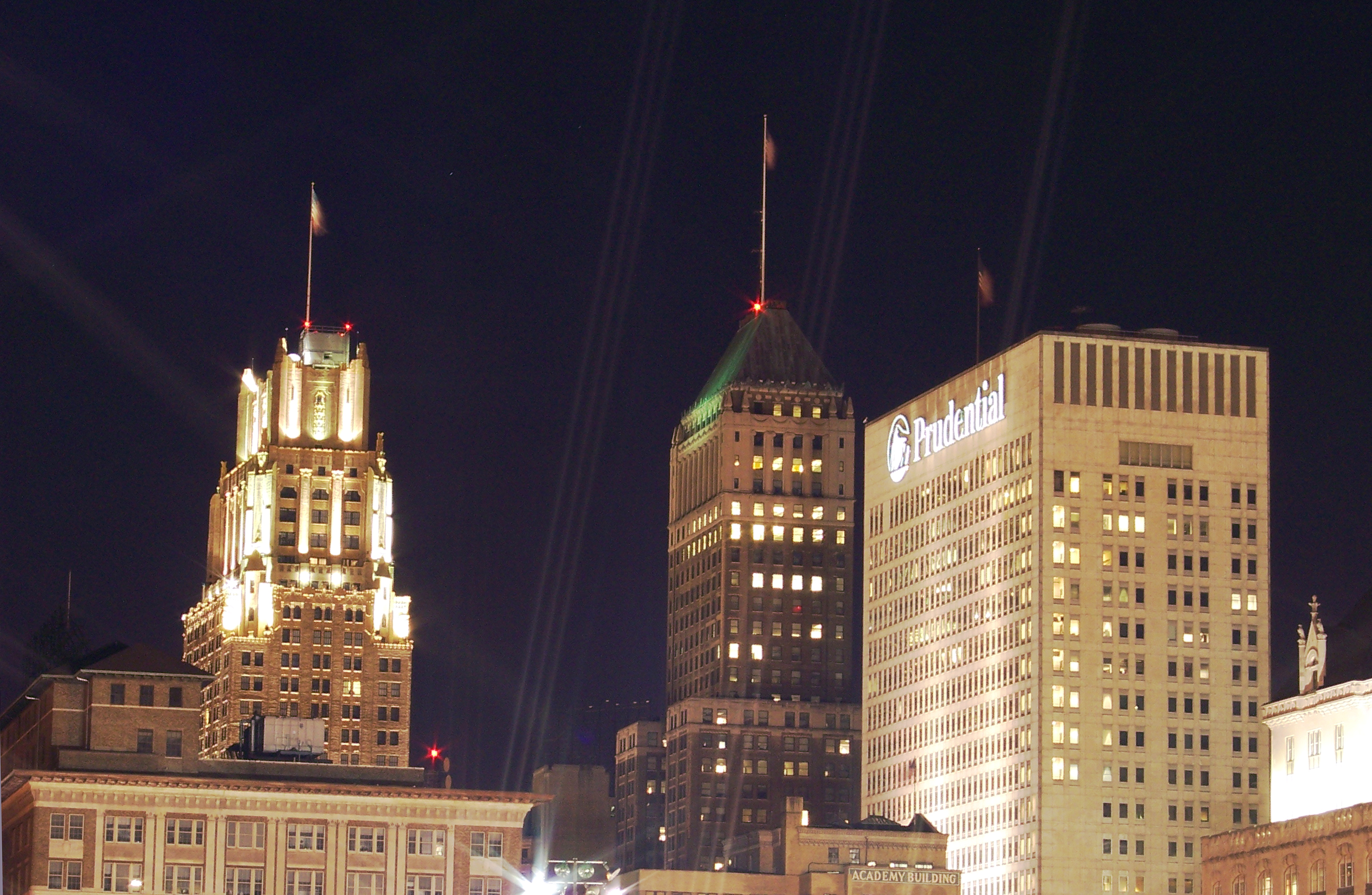
The tallest buildings in downtown Newark: 1180 Raymond, 740 Broad St., and Prudential Insurance Headquarters.

The city made serious mistakes with public housing and urban renewal, although these were not the sole causes of Newark's tragedy. Across several administrations, the city leaders of Newark considered the federal government's offer to pay for 100% of the costs of housing projects as a blessing. The decline in industrial jobs meant that more poor people needed housing, whereas in prewar years, public housing was for working-class families. While other cities were skeptical about putting so many poor families together and were cautious in building housing projects, Newark zealously pursued federal funds. Eventually, Newark had a higher percentage of residents per capita in public housing than any other American city.

The largely Italian-American First Ward, once known as Newark's Little Italy, was one of the hardest hit by urban renewal. Beginning in 1953, a 46-acre (19 ha) housing tract of 1,362 families, labeled a slum because it had dense older housing, was torn down for multi-story, multi-racial Le Corbusier-style public housing high rises, named the Christopher Columbus Homes. The tract had contained 8th Avenue, the commercial heart of the neighborhood. Fifteen small-scale blocks were combined into three "superblocks." The area experienced one of the highest crime rates in the city during the 1970s and suffered major destruction from arson. The Columbus Homes, never in harmony with the rest of the neighborhood, were vacated and abandoned in the 1980s and finally torn down in 1996. By contrast, the Pavilion and Colonnade Apartments, built in 1960 for middle-class families, remain as New Jersey's first urban renewal project and one of the first in the nation.

Between 1949 and 1967, Newark razed at least 10,000 historic buildings across 2,500 acres (1,011 ha), displacing 50,000 residents–65% of them Black and Hispanic. The city evicted far more people than it rehoused: from 1959 to 1967 Newark built just 3,760 units while displacing about 12,000 families for public housing, highways, and other renewal projects. Newark spent more on urban renewal per capita than any of the nation’s thirty largest cities.

From 1950 to 1960, while Newark's overall population dropped from 438,000 to 408,000, it gained 65,000 non-whites. By 1966, Newark had a black majority, a faster turnover than most other northern cities had experienced. Evaluating the riots of 1967, Newark educator Nathan Wright Jr. said, "No typical American city has as yet experienced such a precipitous change from a white to a black majority." The misfortune of the Great Migration and Puerto Rican migration was that Southern blacks and Puerto Ricans were moving to Newark to be industrial workers just as the industrial jobs were decreasing sharply. Many suffered the culture shock of leaving a rural area for an urban industrial job base and environment. The latest migrants to Newark left poverty in the South to find poverty in the North.

During the 1950s alone, Newark's white population decreased by more than 25%, from 363,000 to 266,000. From 1960 to 1967, its white population fell further to 46,000. Although immigration of new ethnic groups combined with white flight markedly affected the demographics of Newark, the racial composition of city workers did not change as rapidly. In addition, the political and economic power in the city remained based on the white population.

In 1966, without consulting any residents of the neighborhood to be affected, mayor Hugh J. Addonizio (1962–1970) offered to condemn and raze 150 acres (61 ha) of a densely populated black neighborhood in the central ward for the University of Medicine and Dentistry of New Jersey (UMDNJ) to move the school from Jersey City to Newark. UMDNJ had wanted to settle in nearby suburban Madison.

In response to the Addonizio administration's lack of school construction, ability to reduce crime, or address the city's concerning property tax situation, former mayor Leo P. Carlin (1953–1962) prophetically warned, "Newark is a city in trouble, a city that is running out of time."

In the spring of 1967, the Addonizio administration applied for federal urban renewal funding through the Model Cities Program. The application highlighted the city's unstable, poor population and its highest in the nation per-capita tax rate. In the application, the administration stated:

The most uncommon characteristic of the city may well be the extent and severity of its problems. There is no major city in the nation where these common urban problems range so widely and cut so deeply...Boasting about progress is unthinkable. Times are too volatile, and to ignore that fact in a welter of self-praise would be fatal.

In 1967, out of a police force of 1,400, only 150 members were black, mostly in subordinate positions. Racial tensions arose because of the disproportion between residents and police demographics. Since Newark's black population lived in neighborhoods that had been white only two decades earlier, nearly all of their apartments and stores were white-owned as well. The loss of jobs affected overall income in the city, and many owners cut back on maintenance of buildings, contributing to a cycle of deterioration in housing stock.

== 1967 Newark riots ==
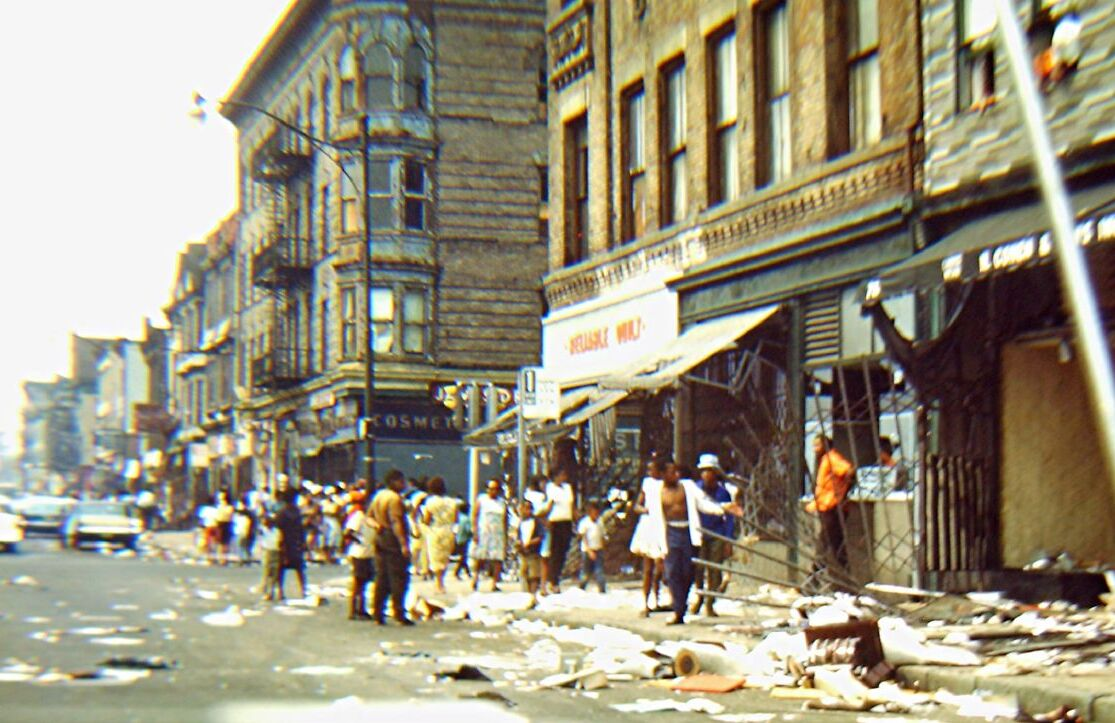
Street scene during the 1967 riots

On July 12, 1967, a taxi driver named John Smith was violently injured while respectfully accepting arrest. A crowd gathered outside the police station where Smith was detained. Due to miscommunication, the crowd believed Smith had died in custody, although he had been transported to a hospital via a back entrance to the station. This sparked scuffles between African Americans and police in the Fourth Ward, although the damage toll was only $2,500.

After television news broadcasts on July 13, however, new and larger riots took place. From July 12 to 17, twenty-six people were killed, 1,500 were wounded, 1,600 were arrested, and $10 million in property was destroyed. More than a thousand businesses were torched or looted, including 167 groceries (most of which would never reopen). At the height of the rioting, the National Guard was called in to occupy the city with tanks and other military equipment. Newark's reputation suffered dramatically. It was said, "wherever American cities are going, Newark will get there first."

The long and short-term causes of the riots are explored in depth in the documentary film Revolution '67.

== After the riots ==
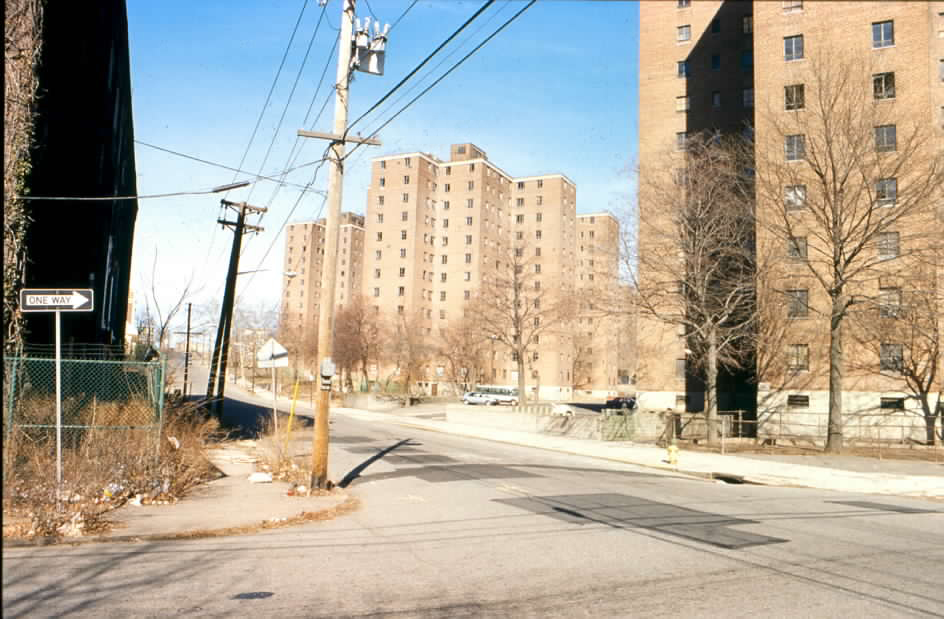
Semi-abandoned housing project buildings in the riot area, mid-1990s

The 1970s and 1980s brought continued decline. Middle-class residents of all races continued to flee the city. Between 1960 and 1990, Newark lost more than 125,000 residents, one-third of its population, leaving abandoned neighborhoods behind. This led certain pockets of the city to develop as domains of poverty and social isolation. As a result, the neighborhood demolition that began under urban renewal continued into these neighborhoods destroying hundreds of historic structures. Some say that whenever the media of New York needed to find some example of urban despair, they traveled to Newark. A writer at The New York Times Magazine said Newark is "a study in the evils, tensions, and frustrations that beset the central cities of America" and Newsweek stated that Newark was "a classic example of urban disaster." Late-night talk show hosts routinely made jokes at the expense of Newark's desperate situation. Johnny Carson once quipped "Have you heard?...The city of Newark is under arrest."

In January 1975, an article in Harper's Magazine ranked the 50 largest American cities in 24 categories, ranging from park space to crime. Newark was one of the five worst in 19 out of 24 categories, and the very worst in nine. According to the article, only 70% of residents owned a telephone. St. Louis, the city ranked second worst, was much farther from Newark than the cities in the top five were from each other. The article declared Newark as "The Worst American City" and concluded:

The city of Newark stands without serious challenge as the worst city of all. It ranked among the worst cities in no fewer than nineteen of twenty-four categories, and it was dead last in nine of them... Newark is a city that desperately needs help.

In 1980, the documentary, Newark: It's My Home, was released. Hosted by Star-Ledger investigative journalist Gordon Bishop, the film profiled three families living in the city while focusing on the future of urban America.

While navigating these challenges, Newark had some achievements in the two and a half decades since the riots. In 1968, the New Community Corporation was founded. It has become one of the most successful community development corporations in the nation. By 1987, the NCC owned and managed 2,265 low-income housing units.

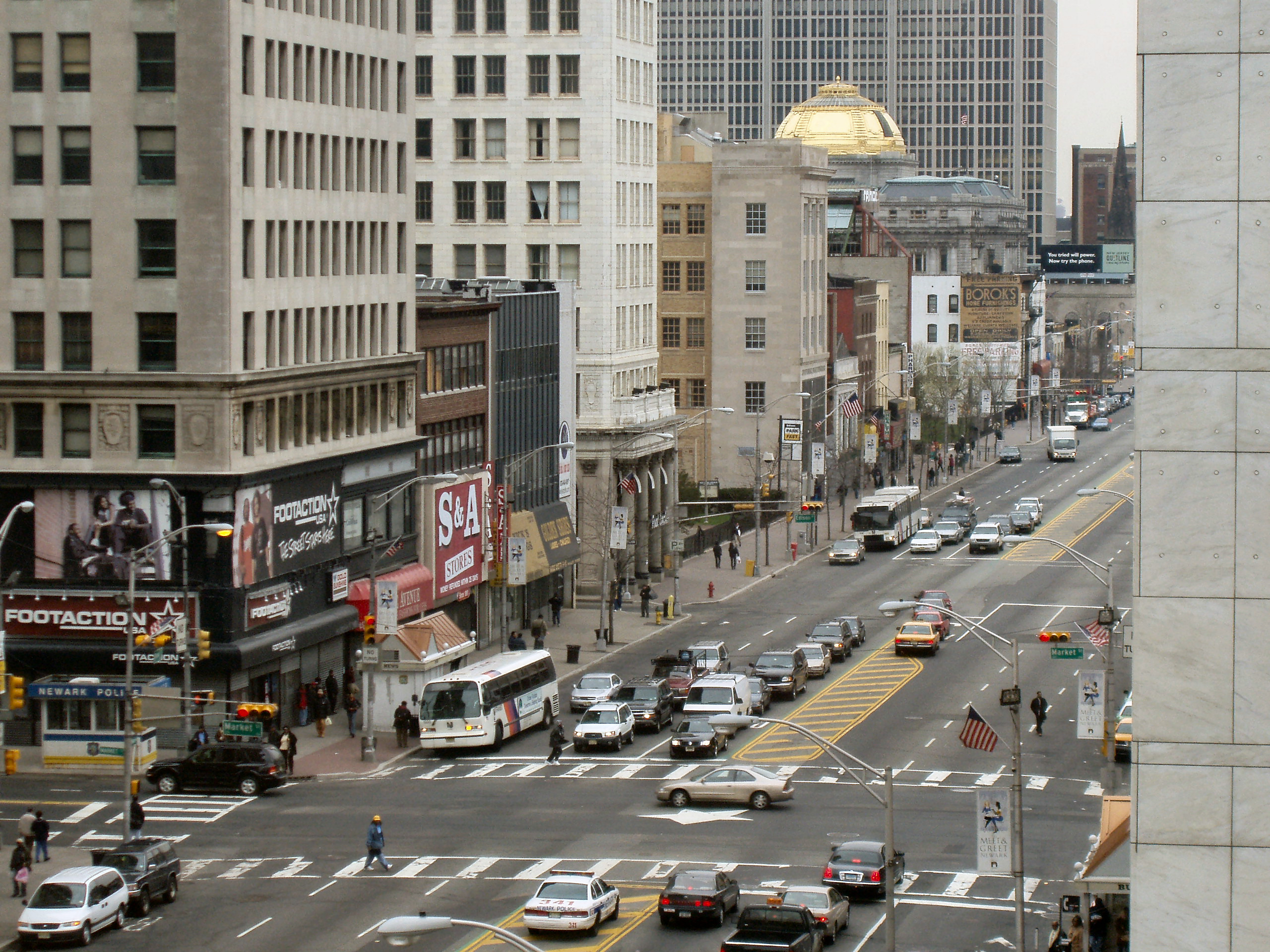
Broad Street from the Prudential Financial Building.

Newark's downtown began to redevelop in the post-riot decades. Less than two weeks after the riots, Prudential announced plans to underwrite a $24 million office complex near Penn Station, dubbed "Gateway." While Gateway provided desperately needed tax revenue for Newark, it hurt the city by isolating office workers and their economic activity from the city. The complex's fortress like design and skywalks allows workers to commute to their offices by car or rail without having to set foot on the city streets. Gateway also set the tone for other office buildings in the area, which also lack a real connection with their surroundings. Today, Gateway houses thousands of white-collar workers, though few live in Newark.

Before the riots, the UMDNJ was considering building in the suburbs. The riots and Newark's undeniable desperation kept the medical school in the city. However, instead of being built on 167 acres (68 ha), the medical school was built on just 60 acres (24 ha), part of which was already city owned, after negotiations with local community organizations as part of the "Newark Accords." However, even with the reduced size of the project, 7,627 residents were displaced through property acquisition and demolition. Students at the medical school soon started the "Student Family Health Care Center" to provide free health care for the underserved population, along with other community service projects. It continues to operate today under Rutgers Health as one of the nation's oldest student-run free health clinics.

In 1970, Kenneth A. Gibson (1970–1986) was the first African-American to be elected mayor of Newark, as well as to be elected mayor of a major northeastern city. The 1970s were a time of battles between Gibson and the shrinking white population. Gibson admitted that "Newark may be the most decayed and financially crippled city in the nation." By 1979, the U.S. Census Bureau reported that over one-third (32.8%) of residents lived at or below the poverty level making Newark the poorest city in the United States with over 100,000 people. Gibson and the city council raised taxes to try to improve services such as schools and sanitation, but they did nothing for Newark's economic base. The CEO of Ballantine's Brewery asserted that Newark's $1 million annual tax bill was the cause of the company's bankruptcy. By 1983, Newark's unemployment rate stood at 15% and the city had suffered a net loss of 66,400 jobs since 1967.

In the 1970s, several City Subway extensions were proposed but never built. Plans included a $116 million tunnel under Springfield Avenue with seven new stations from Washington Street station to the Irvington Bus Terminal. Other proposed routes would have extended service to Paterson via the former Erie Railroad right-of-way, to the Meadowlands Sports Complex, and to Port Newark and Elizabeth through the Ironbound along the former Central Railroad of New Jersey (CNJ) Newark and New York Branch.

In 1986, real estate developer Harry Grant met with mayor Sharpe James (1986–2006) and proposed constructing the tallest building in the United States with a 1,750 ft (530 m), 121-story office tower named the Grant USA Tower. It would include a 500-key hotel, convention center, parking garage and a 60,000 sq ft (5,600 m^{2}) indoor shopping mall called "Renaissance Mall" on the Downtown site of the former CNJ Broad Street Terminal. Grant offered to self finance the project in return for a 15-year property tax abatement. To garner more support from the city, Grant gifted Newark new flagpoles, sidewalks, a five-story Christmas tree and cladded the dome of Newark City Hall in 24-carat gold leaf. By 1989, Grant had lost support from James after Grant's construction crew ignored a cease-and-desist order on replacing the sidewalk in front of City Hall. Later that year the project was struggling and the Renaissance Mall was half constructed when Grant declared bankruptcy and abandoned the project leaving the mall an unfinished blighted construction site and eyesore for 16 years.

In 1996, Money magazine ranked Newark "The Most Dangerous City in the Nation." The magazine cited that Newark had the nation's highest violent crime rate at six times the United States average with roughly 1 in 25 residents being a victim of violent crime. Additionally, the city's auto theft rate was also six times the national average.

In American Pastoral, the 1997 novel by Newark-born author Philip Roth, the protagonist Swede Levov says:

Newark used to be the city where they manufactured everything, now it's the car theft capital of the world ... there was a factory where somebody was making something on every side street. Now there's a liquor store on every street — a liquor store, a pizza stand, and a seedy storefront church. Everything else is in ruins or boarded up.

During the 1990s, Newark started to be referred to as the Brick City. The nickname was coined by young residents living in the brick high-rise public housing projects of the Newark Housing Authority that once occupied the core of the Central Ward. The numerous housing projects gave the city its nickname as part of their legacy that has been enshrined in music from local artists such as the Outsidaz, the Fugees and Redman.

== 21st Century ==
From 2001 to 2004, several suburban towns in Essex County voted to secede and join neighboring Morris County to disconnect themselves from Newark. The nonbinding and mostly symbolic votes came from the view that the county's high taxes benefited Newark at the expense of services for the suburban municipalities in the west of the county. Specifically, the growing cost of Essex County's overstressed criminal justice system and the demands that Newark's issues place on outlying towns.

A major factor contributing to Newark's long-standing challenges has been the political corruption that has plagued the city for decades. Before the election of mayor Cory Booker (2006–2013) in 2006, four of the five preceding Newark mayors — Ralph A. Villani (1949–1953), Hugh J. Addonizio, Kenneth A. Gibson and Sharpe James — were all indicted on corruption charges for crimes that took place while they were in office.

Additionally, prior to the election of mayor Booker in 2006, Newark did not have a formal city planning department. As a result, Julia Vitullo-Martin, an urban planner and a fellow at the Manhattan Institute for Policy Research, concluded:

Newark is a living laboratory for nearly every bad planning idea of the 20th century. Urban renewal destroyed whole neighborhoods, replacing low-rise, vernacular residences with public housing projects. Built on superblocks, the projects wiped out the original grid as well as commercial and retail activity. Interstate highways cut the city into pieces, dividing and isolating neighborhoods. And crime, of course, made sport of the general civic unraveling. Corporations, most prominently Prudential Insurance, tried to help. But to protect employees from the deteriorating environment, they built fortress-like towers, connected to the train station and to one another by skywalks, bypassing the streets below and walling off the waterfront with parking garages and hostile architecture. Meanwhile, surface roads were widened to facilitate traffic, making escape to the suburbs more efficient. Gradually, shops and restaurants closed, leaving a few dejected discount stores behind.

By the mid-first decade of the 21st century, the rate of crime had fallen by 58% from historic highs associated with the severe drug problems in the mid-1990s, however homicides remained at record highs for a city of its size with a per capita homicide rate three times that of nearby New York City. In the first two months of 2008, the homicide rate dropped dramatically, with no homicides recorded for 43 days. However, even with progress made to reduce crime, in 2012 Newark was ranked as the 6th most dangerous city in the United States. In 2013 Newark recorded 111 homicides, the first year ending in triple digits in seven years and the highest tally since 1990, accounting for 27% of all homicides statewide. Since 2016, Newark has been successful in driving down the city's homicide rate to a new "historic low" of 37 homicides in 2024, down from 48 in 2023, the lowest homicide rate since 1960. However, overall violent crime rose 21% after two years of consecutive declines in 2022 and 2023.

In October 2012, Newark was effected by Hurricane Sandy with power outages throughout the city and severe flooding in parts of the Ironbound. The Passaic Valley Sewerage Commission's wastewater treatment facility in the neighborhood lost power for three days and was flooded by tidal surge, resulting in billions of gallons of untreated and partially treated sewage being released into area waterways and destruction of critical equipment. Logan Hall, a halfway house in the Ironbound, lost power during the storm resulting in the escape of 15 inmates that were later rearrested. The hurricane forced the closure of Newark Liberty International Airport for two days resulting in the cancellation of over 2,600 flights.

=== Federal monitor of the Newark Police Department ===
In July 2014, the United States Department of Justice announced that the Newark Police Department (NPD) would be placed under a federal monitor after a three-year investigation found the NPD "engaged in a pattern of unconstitutional practices, chiefly in its use of force, stop-and-frisk tactics, unwarranted stops and arrests and discriminatory police actions." Specifically, disproportionately stopping and arresting African Americans to where three-quarters of the stops were deemed unconstitutional, use of excessive force in 20% of incidents, stealing property off of residents and retaliation against those who questioned police actions. The investigation also found that the department's internal affairs bureau was dysfunctional to the point that it had only sustained one complaint of police brutality over a five-year period. Newark became the first municipal police department in state history to operate under a federal watchdog and the 13th in the United States. In December 2014, mayor Ras Baraka (2014–present) announced the creation of a Civilian Complaint Review board. In 2016, the city entered into a consent decree agreeing to a federal monitoring program and comprehensive reforms. In 2018, the department began a de-escalation training program that they credit for the achievement of no officer discharging their weapon on duty in 2020. Since entering the consent decree, overall crime in Newark has been reduced by 40%. As of 2024, the Newark Police Department was still under federal oversight. In November 2025, a judge lifted Newark’s consent decree of the federal monitor, ruling that the reforms the NPD implemented have been "effective at curbing unconstitutional stops, searches, excessive use of force and other abuses."

=== State fiscal oversight ===
In August 2014, Newark cited a $30.1 million deficit in the city's 2013 budget from the Booker administration and an anticipated $63.4 million deficit for 2014 requiring $93 million to balance its 2014 budget. Mayor Baraka requested emergency aid from New Jersey which would require state oversight and involvement in the city's financial affairs. In September 2014, the city auctioned 61 properties, most of which had been foreclosed, in an attempt to raise funds to address the budget deficit. In October 2014, the New Jersey Department of Community Affairs awarded Newark $10 million in transitional aid, which came with a required oversight memorandum of understanding (MOU). As part of the MOU, state oversight required all senior hires be approved by the state Division of Local Government Services and all programs, including programs that offered grants, be state approved. The state also reduced the budget for the city clerk and expenses for council members by half for 2015 as part of the agreement. The state issued similar requirements in 2008, 2009 and 2012 when Newark received millions of dollars in emergency state aid. Additionally, New Jersey reprimanded the city for not following a 2011 state pension reform law requiring all public workers to contribute more toward their health care premiums. By Newark not collecting those payments from its workers, taxpayers had to make up the difference. Newark’s fiscal challenges still persist. After accepting $22 million in transitional state aid in 2024 and requesting an additional $30 million bridge loan for 2025, the city now owes New Jersey a total of $52 million that will have to be paid back between 2029 and 2031.

=== Newark Water Crisis ===
Lead concentrations in Newark's water accumulated for several years in the 2010s as a result of inaccurate testing and poor leadership at the Newark Watershed Conservation and Development Corporation (NWCDC). The central problem was officials’ criminal negligence, which allowed lead service pipes to leach lead into the city’s drinking water. In 2014, the New Jersey State Comptroller released a report detailing widespread corruption throughout the NWCDC leading to multiple corporation officials being arrested and charged with stealing money and accepting bribes in 2016.

In March 2016, state and federal environment officials said that lead levels in thirty Newark Public Schools buildings were higher than the federal limit. The Newark teachers union and the New Jersey Sierra Club said that the school leadership knew of the lead problem in the drinking water since 2014 according to an internal memo. In 2017, 13% of children in New Jersey afflicted with elevated lead lived in Newark, which accounted for only 3.8% children statewide.

Several top officials in Newark denied that their water system had a widespread lead problem, declaring on their website that the water was absolutely safe to drink. Even after municipal water tests revealed the severity of the problem and the city received three noncompliance notices for exceeding lead levels between 2017 and 2018, mayor Ras Baraka denied there was any issue and mailed a brochure to the residents of Newark saying that the drinking water meets all federal standards and was safe to drink. Although the city called an emergency declaration that allowed them to purchase and distribute water filters for faucets, many of the filters were faulty and did not work. In December 2018, in order to combat the negative publicity of the lead contamination, Newark hired Mercury Public Affairs, the same public relations firm that the former Governor of Michigan, Rick Snyder, hired during the water crisis in Flint, for $225,000.00. The firm was hired even after mayor Baraka rejected comparisons to the Flint water crisis calling them "absolutely and outrageously false statements" via a message on the city's website that was later deleted. Mayor Baraka later called the allegations that he deliberately misled residents "BS" stating "we weren't saying that the water coming out of your tap was safe ... it said the source water is fine. After that, we explained what the problem is. It's misleading to tell people that the water is contaminated."

In 2019, Newark began the work to replace the lead water pipes primarily financed by a $120 million loan from the Essex County Improvement Authority. By spring of 2021, the city claimed they had removed more than 20,000 of the lead service lines.

In February 2024, officials announced that they found three properties with faulty service line replacements by a then unnamed third party. The city had those lines replaced same day. In October 2024, it was announced that the company hired to replace a portion of the city's lead service lines, JAS Group Enterprise, Inc., lied, falsified records and never performed the replacement work at 1,500 sites. The Environmental Protection Agency (EPA) stated that any lead pipes that were discovered have been replaced.

== Newark's Renaissance ==
=== Downtown ===
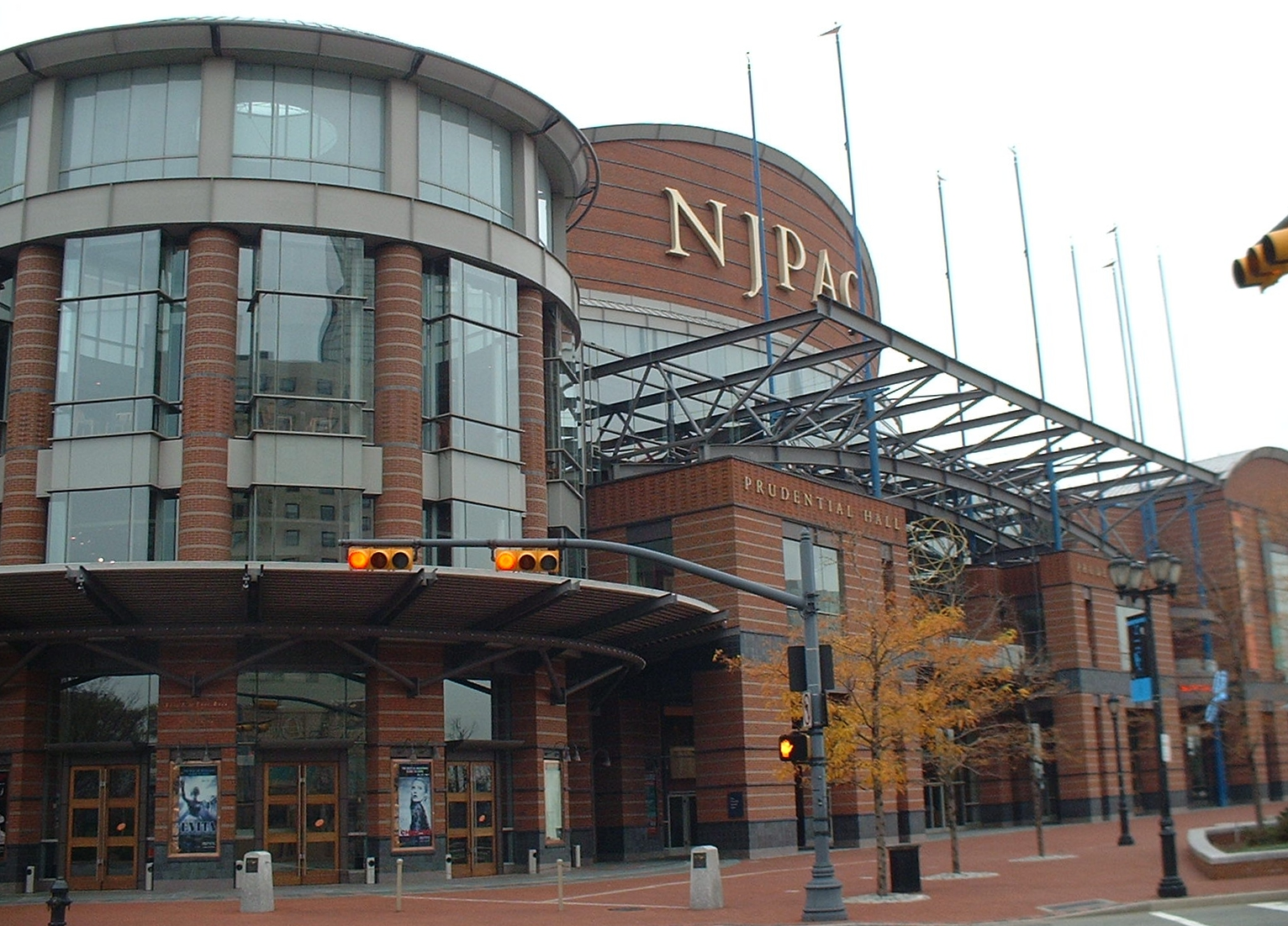
The New Jersey Performing Arts Center

The New Jersey Performing Arts Center (NJPAC), which opened in the downtown area in 1997 and built by the State of New Jersey at a cost of $180 million, was seen by many as the first step in the city's road to revival, and brought in people to Newark who otherwise might never have visited. NJPAC is known for its acoustics, and features the New Jersey Symphony Orchestra as its resident orchestra. NJPAC also presents a diverse group of visiting artists such as Itzhak Perlman, Sarah Brightman, Sting, 'N Sync, Lauryn Hill, the Vienna Boys' Choir, Yo Yo Ma, the Royal Concertgebouw Orchestra of Amsterdam, and the Alvin Ailey American Dance Theater.

Newark’s renaissance has been a mix of successes and set backs. The city built Riverfront Stadium for the Newark Bears in 1999, but the team folded in 2013 and the stadium was demolished in 2019. The Prudential Center (“The Rock”) opened in 2007 for the New Jersey Devils on the site of the former abandoned Renaissance Mall. The Newark Public Library saw a renovation and modest expansion but has closed four branches since 2009 due to financial and facility issues. Major transit projects included the AirTrain Newark connection to Newark Liberty International Airport Station in 2001 and the 2006 Newark Light Rail extension from Penn Station to Broad Street station, the first expansion since 1935. However, the one mile (1.6 km) extension was intended to be the first phase of the larger 8.8-mile (14.2 km) Newark–Elizabeth Rail Link, which was later cancelled. Since 2010, downtown has seen several new commercial and residential developments, as well as two new public spaces—Mulberry Commons and Newark Riverfront Park, the latter built along the Passaic River providing citizens riverfront access for the first time in over a century. However, the city's public safety issues influenced the park's design with its signature orange color chosen for its lack of affiliation with local street gangs. Since 2024, NJPAC and the Newark Museum of Art have begun expansion projects featuring housing, gallery space, and arts education facilities.

While most of the city's revitalization efforts have been focused in the downtown area, adjoining neighborhoods have in recent years begun to see some signs of development, particularly in the Central Ward. Between 2000 and 2010, Newark experienced its first population increase since the 1940s. That trend continued between 2010 and 2020 with the city gaining 34,409 (12.4%) residents. Nevertheless, the "Renaissance" has been unevenly felt across the city where some districts continue to have below-average household incomes and higher-than-average rates of poverty. Overall, a quarter of Newark residents live in poverty, more than double the national rate, and the city is one of the poorest cities with over 100,000 people in the United States. For two consecutive years in 2023 and 2024, Forbes ranked Newark as the "Worst City for Renters" in the nation due to a sharp increase in median rent per unit and significantly fewer available rental units per 100,000 people compared to neighboring Jersey City and New York City. In 2025, Newark saw the average rental price spike 8.1%, the sharpest increase of the 100 largest cities in the United States.

Newark's several attempts to adopt a lasting positive nickname reflect the city's efforts to revitalize its downtown and national image. In the 1950s, the term New Newark was given to the city by then-mayor Leo Carlin to help convince major corporations to remain in Newark. In the 1960s, Newark was nicknamed the Gateway City after the redeveloped Gateway Center, which shares its name with the state's Gateway Region that Newark anchors. More recently, the local media and politicians have referred to the city as Renaissance Newark, as opposed to Brick City, in an attempt to gain recognition for and highlight its revitalization efforts.

=== Tech hub ===
Extensive fiber optic networks in Newark started in the 1990s when telecommunication companies installed fiber optic network to put Newark as a strategic location for data transfer between Manhattan and the rest of the country during the dot-com boom. At the same time, the city encouraged those companies to install more than they needed. A vacant department store was converted into a telecommunication center called 165 Halsey Street. It became one of the world's largest carrier hotels. As a result, after the dot-com bust, there were a surplus of dark fiber (unused fiber optic cables). Twenty years later, the city and other private companies started utilizing the dark fiber to create high performance networks within the city.

Since 2007, several technology oriented companies have moved to Newark: Audible (global headquarters, 2007), Panasonic (North America headquarters, 2013), AeroFarms (global headquarters, 2015), Broadridge Financial Solutions (1,000 jobs, 2017), WebMD (700 jobs, 2021), Ørsted (North American digital operations headquarters, 2021), and HAX Accelerator (US headquarters, 2021).

== See also ==
- Timeline of Newark, New Jersey
- Sports in Newark, New Jersey
