= Newark Symphony Hall =

- Interactive map of Newark Symphony Hall
- Address: 1020 Broad Street; Newark, New Jersey; United States
- Owner: Essex County Improvement Authority
- Capacity: Sarah Vaughan Hall: 3,500; Newark Stage: 200
- Type: Performing arts center

Construction
- Opened: 1925
- Architect: Grad Associates

Website
- newarksymphonyhall.org

- Salaam Temple
- U.S. National Register of Historic Places
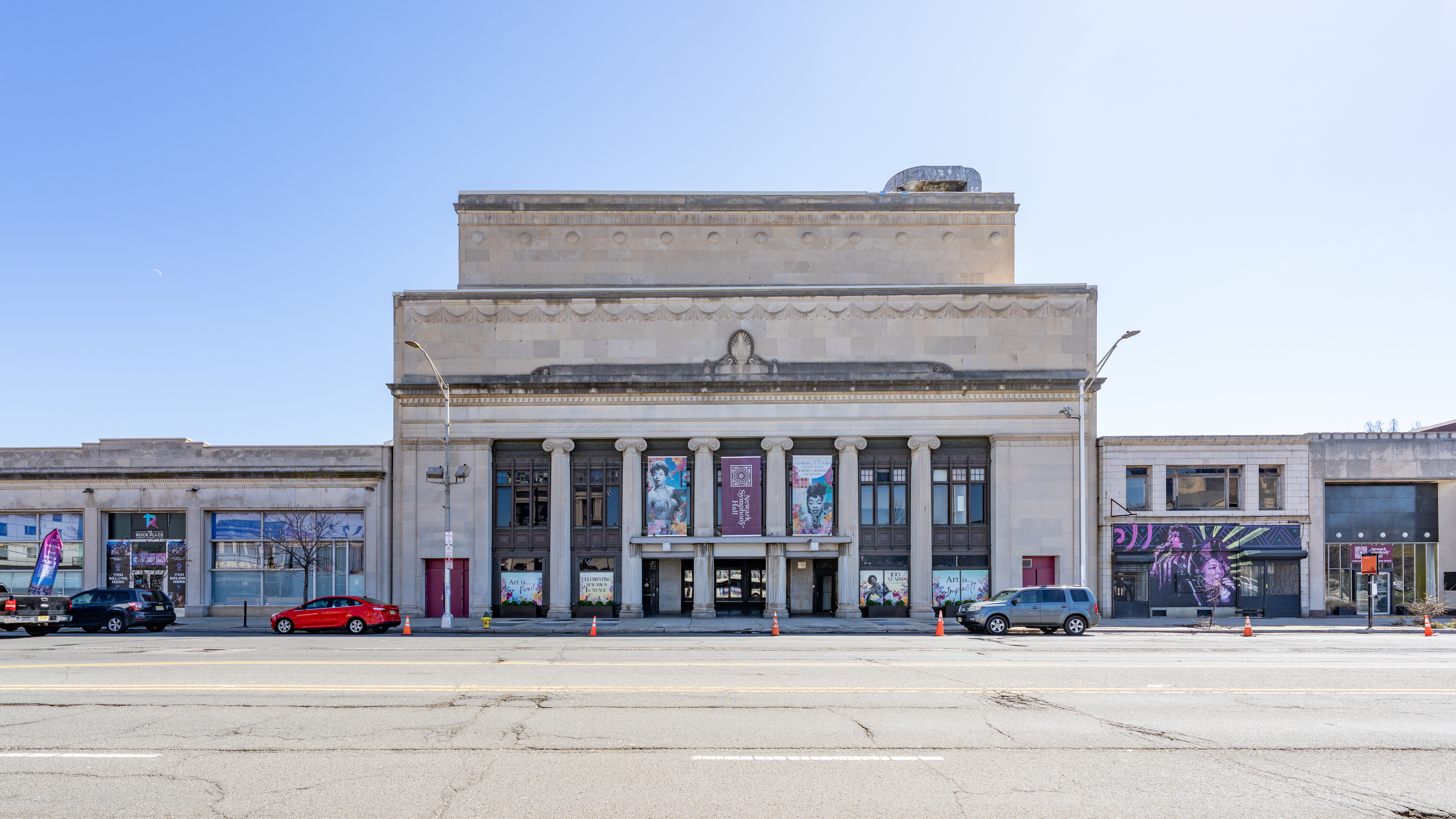
- Symphony Hall and Boys Chorus School

- Location within Essex County, New Jersey Location within New Jersey Location within the United States
- Location: 1020 Broad Street, Newark, New Jersey, U.S.
- Coordinates: 40°43′40″N 74°10′35″W
- Area: 1.0566 acres (0.4276 ha)
- Built: 1925
- Architect: Grad Associates
- Architectural style: Classical Revival
- NRHP reference No.: 77000867
- Added to NRHP: October 5, 1977

Newark Symphony Hall is a performing arts center located at 1020 Broad Street in Newark, New Jersey. Built in 1925, it was added to the National Register of Historic Places in 1977. It was known for many years as The Mosque Theater, and is the former home of the New Jersey Symphony Orchestra, New Jersey State Opera and the New Jersey Ballet Company.

The Hall is owned by the Essex County Improvement Authority and is operated by the non-profit Newark Performing Arts Corporation (NPAC).

== Design and construction ==
Originally built in 1925 by the Shriners at a cost of more than $2 million as Salaam Temple and colloquially known as The Mosque, the four-story building has been Newark Symphony Hall since 1964. The interior features Greek and Egyptian motifs, marble columns, a crystal chandelier, gold-leaf fret work and two-columned side promenades. The neo-classical building was designed by Frank Grad, a prominent Newark architect, whose work includes the Lefcourt Newark Building and many others downtown.

The 3,500-seat main concert hall is named for Sarah Vaughan, a native Newarker, and is renowned for its acoustics. Newark Stage is a 200-seat black box theater used by theatrical productions. The Terrace Ballroom is used for receptions. The Studio is a rehearsal space. The Dance Studio is home to one of three facilities in the state used by the School of the Garden State Ballet, founded in 1951 and nationally recognized for its training.

== History ==
During its early years the theater received the patronage of Mrs. Parker O. Griffith, with a foundation supported by the Griffith Piano Company. The company also built the Griffith Building, used as a showroom, workshop, office tower and recital auditorium. In the early 1920s, the company formed a partnership with Earl Beach, the Griffith Beach Organ Company. Beach had worked with Robert Hope-Jones at his factory in Elmira, New York. The organ in Symphony Hall is one of ten theatre organs installed in northeastern New Jersey between 1921 and 1925. The Harmonic Tuba has H.J. (Hope-Jones) stamped on it.

In 1940, American contralto Marian Anderson became the first African American to perform at the symphony hall.

New Jersey's first television station, WATV Channel 13, debuted on May 15, 1948 from studios at The Mosque Theater. The commercial station was owned by Atlantic Television, a subsidiary of Bremer Broadcasting Corporation who also owned WAAT (970 AM, now WNYM) and WAAT-FM (94.7 MHz., now WXBK) whose studios were also in the building. Today Channel 13 is non-commercial WNET. From 1958-1961 the former WATV studios were home to WNTA Channel 13. From 1965-1989, WNJU Channel 47.

In 1964, the floundering Mosque Theater was on the verge on bankruptcy and there was a threat of it being torn down. Sol Hurok, an impresario who had presented many of his artists there commented, "This would be a terrible misfortune for music. It is one of the great concert halls of the country, with marvelous acoustics and great sight lines. It must be preserved." It was purchased by the city for $340,000, becoming a non-profit organization, and renamed Symphony Hall.

Among the opera companies and stars who have appeared at Symphony Hall are the Metropolitan Opera, Jerome Hines, Beverly Sills, Roberta Peters, Leontyne Price, and Robert Merrill (who made his debut there).

Victor Borge, Judy Garland, Bob Dylan, The Supremes, Patti LaBelle, Teddy Pendergrass, Richard Pryor, James Cleveland, Count Basie, Kirk Franklin, Queen Latifah, Gladys Knight, Parliament-Funkadelic, The Temptations, Tony Bennett and other artists have also performed. The Rolling Stones and Eric Clapton are among the rock legends to have performed at the venue.

Prior to the opening of the New Jersey Performing Arts Center, Symphony Hall was one of the principal performance venues in the state, one of the homes of the New Jersey Symphony, the Newark Boys Choir, and the New Jersey State Opera. The Newark Dance Theater, African Globe Theater Works, and the New Jersey Ballet also showed work at the Hall. While much activity has shifted to NJPAC, Symphony Hall's continues to present theater, music and dance. Community organizations have been conducting their annual programs at Newark Symphony Hall for twenty-five years and more, and continue to do so.

The area just south of Downtown Newark near Lincoln Park where the Hall is located is known as The Coast. Newark, and the Coast in particular, in the past has been a large producer of gospel music and continues to produce well-known black artists.

Newark Symphony Hall is home to Special Ensemble, winners of the McDonald's Gospelfest, and hosts the "When Praise Goes Up!" annual gospel showcase. Members of Special Ensemble include Chanel Pearson, Craig McCargo, Kimani Carson, Drew McMillan, Donovan Jones, Gabriel Moses, Robert Johnson, Leah Gaines, Melina Wilson, and Nia Harris. Special Ensemble was founded by Hugh Davis and is under the musical direction of Candice Anderson and the managing direction of Nicole Davis. They have been together since August 2010.

In 2007, an announcement was made for the development Museum of African American Music, a Smithsonian Institution affiliate. The museum would be a collection of archives of "jazz, blues, spirituals, hip-hop, rock 'n roll, gospel, house music, and rhythm and blues".

In 2009, the Hall announced a $40 million campaign to restore the theater.

In 2010 the venue for the first time hosted events of the Geraldine R. Dodge Poetry Festival.

In November 2018, NPAC, the Hall's operating company, appointed Taneshia Nash Laird, former Executive Director of the Arts Council of Princeton, as its new President and Chief Executive Officer.

In December 2019, the Hall hosted singing and dancing auditions for a BET miniseries about the history of Uptown Records.

In January 2020, restoration work continued and its completion was scheduled to coincide with a celebration of the building's 100th anniversary in 2025. Events in the Sarah Vaughan Concert Hall, Newark Stage and Terrace Ballroom continued during restoration. In October, the Hall was approved for a $750,000 grant from the Preserve New Jersey Historic Preservation Fund to be used to help fund its 5-year renovation, scheduled to restart in early 2021.

In April 2021, while the venue was still closed due to the Coronavirus pandemic, it began hosting virtual events including live-streamed plays, and launched a career accelerator and business incubator called “The Lab”, to support the local performing arts community. In May, it was reported that the renovation budget had increased to $50 million, with additional improvements to include a restored original marquee, a new plaza with a lettered crosswalk, and the renovation and reopening of an unused floor that had been empty for 30 years.

== Operation ==
The Newark Symphony Hall is operated by the non-profit Newark Performing Arts Corporation (NPAC). The Hall's annual budget is $1.7 million, of which the city of Newark contributes $600,000. The Hall is listed on state and national registers of historic places, and pursues state-based historic tax credits and other tax credit streams and initiatives, such as Opportunity Zone funding. NPAC's CEO and President is Talia Young.

== See also ==
- The Coast
- Stanley Theater (Newark, New Jersey)
- National Register of Historic Places listings in Essex County, New Jersey
