= Grad Associates =

Architectural firm

- Type: Private
- Industry: Architectural services
- Founded: 1906
- Founder: Frank Grad
- Defunct: February 19, 2010
- Headquarters: Newark, New Jersey

Grad Associates, formerly Grad Partnership and Frank Grad & Sons, was an architectural firm based in Newark, New Jersey. Founded in 1906 by Frank Grad (1882–1968), the company was later run by his sons, Bernard (d. August 4, 2000) and Howard (d. 1992). The company closed its doors on February 19, 2010.

Born in Austria, Frank Grad was educated at the Newark Arts School (the forerunner of Arts High School). He began his Newark architectural practice in 1906. Grad was capable of working in many styles, from the Beaux-Arts, YMHA on MLK Boulevard, to the Spanish colonial Stanley Theater and Beth Israel Hospital, to the Neo-Classical Newark Symphony Hall, to the Art Deco 1180 Raymond Boulevard (aka, the Lefcourt Building). Several of Grad's greatest commissions, the YMHA, the Stanley Theater, Beth Israel, and the Lefcourt Building, were for Jewish patrons. In the mid-1930s the name of the firm became Frank Grad & Sons. Grad died in 1968.

His firm, Grad Associates was continued by his sons after Grad died. Grad Associates peaked in the 1980s when there were over 130 architects working there, but closed in the winter of 2010, a victim of the Great Recession. The firm added new partners in 1966, and became the Grad Partnership. In 1990, the firm became GRAD Associates, P.A. At the time the firm closed the managing partners were Allen Trousdale and Vasant Kshirsagar. Grad was one of the first large firms in the New York region to invest in extensive computer-aided design facilities.

== Notable buildings ==
- Izod Center including the Pegasus Restaurant
- Harborside Financial Center, Jersey City, New Jersey
- Seton Hall University School of Law at One Newark Center
- Newark Legal Center
- Newark Liberty International Airport Continental Airlines Terminal and Atlantic City International Airport
- 1180 Raymond Boulevard, originally the Lefcourt Building
- One Newark Center
- University Heights, Newark, New Jersey
- James V. Forrestal Building in Washington, D.C.
- Stanley Theater/Newark Gospel Tabernacle
- Essex House New York on Central Park
- General Electric Regional Distribution Center, Englewood Cliffs, New Jersey
- General Public Utilities, Parsippany-Troy Hills, New Jersey
- Howard Savings Bank Office Complex, Livingston, New Jersey
- Mt. Airy Associates I, II, III, IV, V Bernards Township, New Jersey
- Nabisco World Headquarters - Planting, Livingston, New Jersey
- Newark Symphony Hall
- New Jersey Bell Corporate Data Center II, Freehold, New Jersey
- New Jersey State Capitol Cultural Complex (New Jersey State Museum, Auditorium and Planetarium; New Jersey State Library)
- Overlook Farms, Readington Township, New Jersey
- Park 80 Addition, Saddlebrook, New Jersey
- Prudential Eastern Home Office, Parsippany-Troy Hills, New Jersey
- Prudential Property & Casualty Insurance Co, Holmdel Township, New Jersey
- Prudential Supply Processing Center, New Providence, New Jersey
- Rockaway Farms, Tewksbury Township, New Jersey
- Springfield Farms, Tewksbury Township, New Jersey
- Two University Plaza, Hackensack, New Jersey
- Windemere at Hanover, Hanover Township, New Jersey
- Xerox Corporation - Parking, Webster, New York
- Essex County College - Newark, New Jersey

== See also ==
- John H. & Wilson C. Ely
