= Raymond Boulevard =

Major road in Newark, New Jersey, United States

- Interactive map of Raymond Boulevard
- West end: Warren Street / Lock Street in Newark
- Major junctions: Route 21 in Newark; US 1-9 in Newark
- East end: I-95 / N.J. Turnpike / US 1-9 Truck in Newark

Raymond Boulevard is a major thoroughfare in Newark, New Jersey. The eastern portion of the road acts as the westbound member of a one-way pair; eastbound traffic uses Market Street and Ferry Street. Raymond Boulevard carries eastbound and westbound traffic west of Market Street, passing through Newark Penn Station and intersecting with McCarter Highway (New Jersey Route 21), Broad Street, Halsey Street, Washington Street, among others.

== History ==
The street was built on the filled-in Morris Canal, a portion of which became the underground right-of-way for the Newark City Subway. The eastern three miles (4.8 km) were part of the Lincoln Highway.

== Route description ==
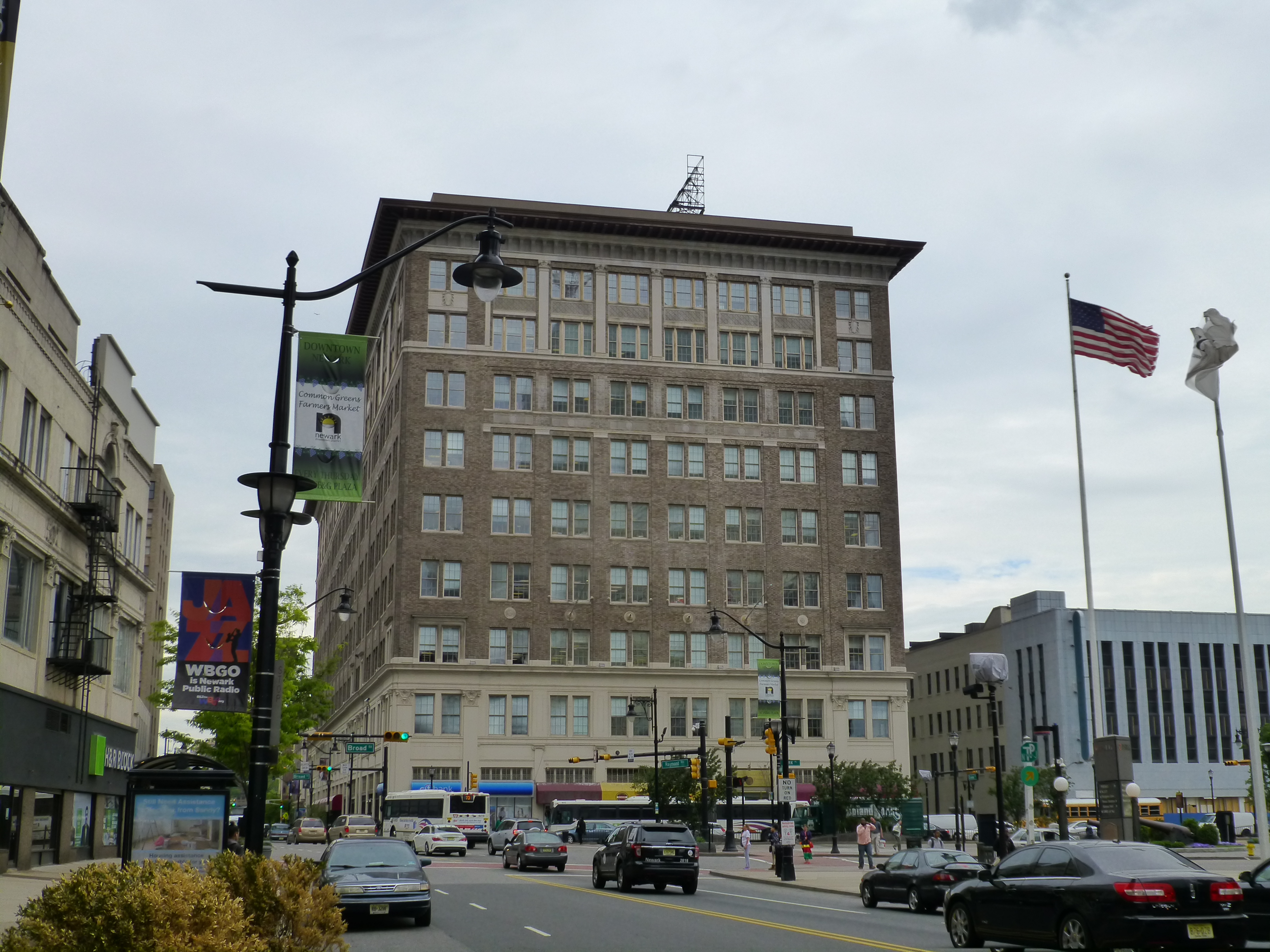
Raymond Boulevard looking to Broad Street

The road carries traffic from the interchange at the west end of the Pulaski Skyway (U.S. Route 1/9) and U.S. Route 1-9 Truck in the Ironbound, passing thorough historic Riverbank Park and abutting Newark Riverfront Park on the Passaic River.

At Pennsylvania Station, it enters the high-tech corridor of downtown Newark and is lined with modern office skyscrapers such as the Gateway Center, Newark Legal Center, One Newark Center, and 80 Park Plaza.

The Eleven 80 building, an Art Deco office tower and one of the tallest buildings in Newark, is named for its Raymond Boulevard address, across from Military Park.

The avenue crosses Broad Street two blocks north of Four Corners, the traditional center of the city. Proceeding west, it passes the campuses of Rutgers–Newark and New Jersey Institute of Technology. At the Warren Street intersection, Raymond Boulevard ends when it merges into Lock Street.

== Major intersections ==
The entire route is in Newark, Essex County.

mi	km	Destinations	Notes
		Warren Street / Lock Street	Western terminus
0.61	0.98	Broad Street / Park Place – Prudential Center, City Hall, Military Park, New Jersey Performing Arts Center, New Jersey Historical Society	
0.33	0.53	Route 21 (McCarter Highway) – Newark Liberty International Airport, Riverfront Stadium, Newark Museum	
0.00– 1.98	0.00– 3.19	Market Street – Penn Station, City Without Walls Gallery	
1.69	2.72	Jackson Street	Interchange
0.13	0.21	US 1-9 south (Pulaski Skyway) – Port Newark, Newark Airport	Interchange
0.00	0.00	I-95 / N.J. Turnpike US 1-9 Truck north – Bayonne, Jersey City	Interchange, eastern terminus
1.000 mi = 1.609 km; 1.000 km = 0.621 mi
