= Newark Legal Center =

- One Riverfront Center
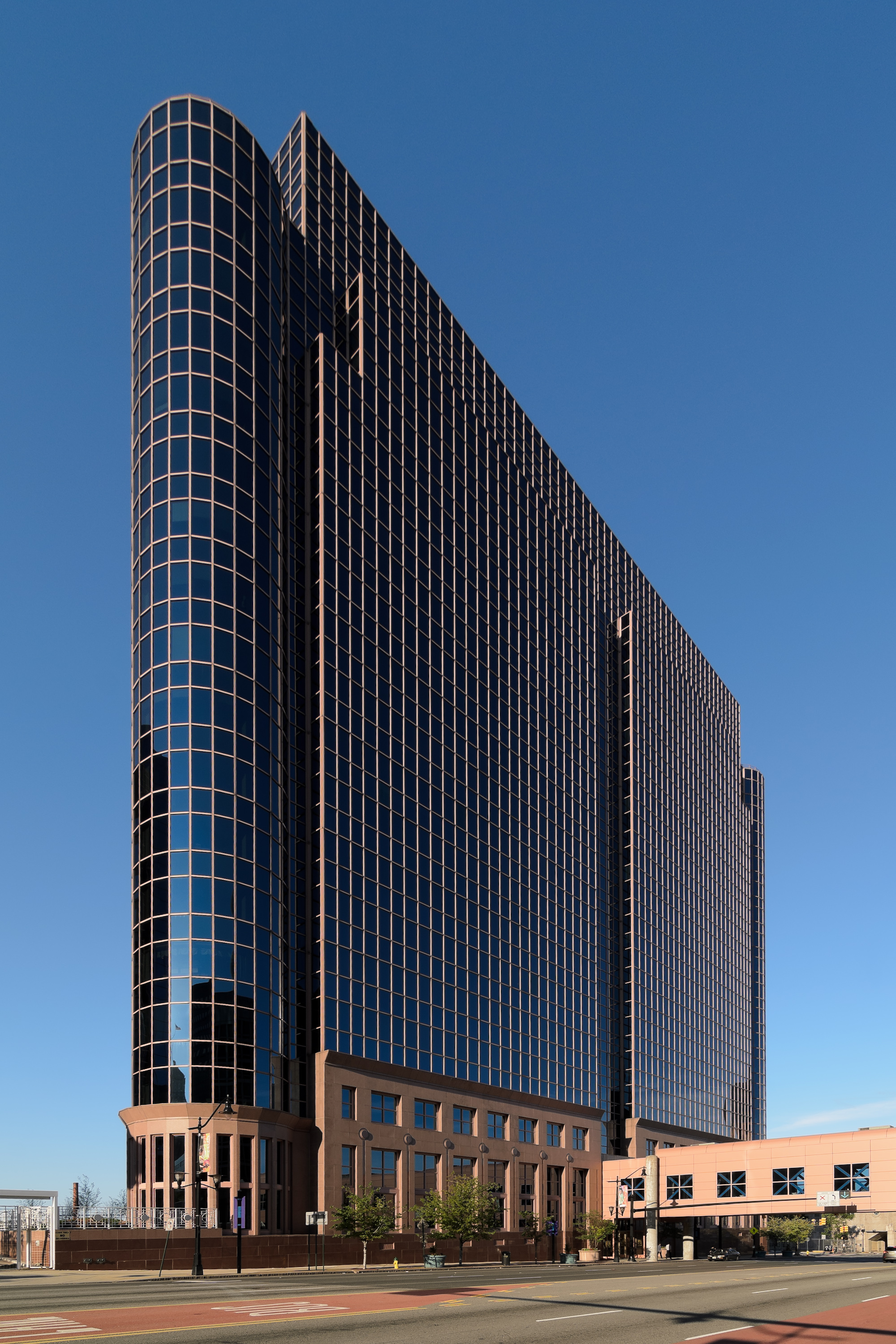
- Interactive map of the Newark Legal Center area

General information
- Type: Office
- Location: 1 Riverfront Plaza; Newark, New Jersey
- Coordinates: 40°44′09″N 74°09′52″W
- Completed: 2000
- Management: Matrix Development

Height
- Roof: 329 ft (100 m)

Technical details
- Floor count: 20
- Floor area: 411,617 sq ft (38,240.5 m^{2})

Design and construction
- Architect: Grad Associates
- Developer: Port Authority of New York and New Jersey

The Newark Legal Center, also known as One Riverfront Center, is an office building in Newark, New Jersey located along the banks of the Passaic River and connected by a skywalk over Raymond Boulevard to Gateway Center and Penn Station. Originally developed by the Port Authority of New York and New Jersey, the twenty story tower contains condominium and rental office space geared to the legal profession. Land between the tower and the riverfront in the shadow of the nearby Dock Bridge, will be incorporated into a Newark Riverfront Park.

== See also ==
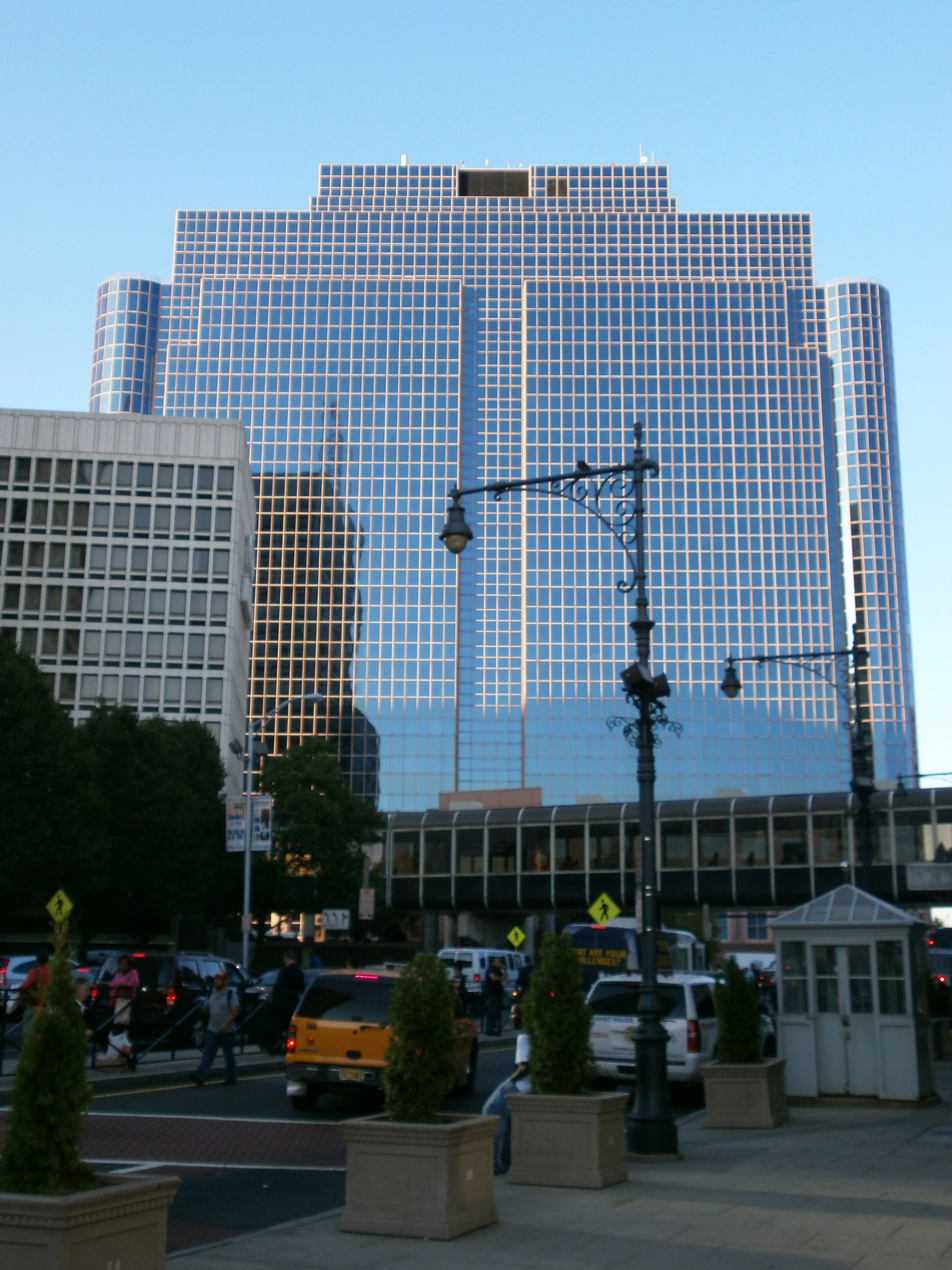
The Newark Legal Center from Newark Penn Station

- List of tallest buildings in Newark
- Penn Plaza East
- Government Center (Newark)
- List of tallest buildings in New Jersey
