= Gateway Center (Newark) =

Commercial complex in Newark, New Jersey

Coordinates: 40°44′05″N 74°9′51″W

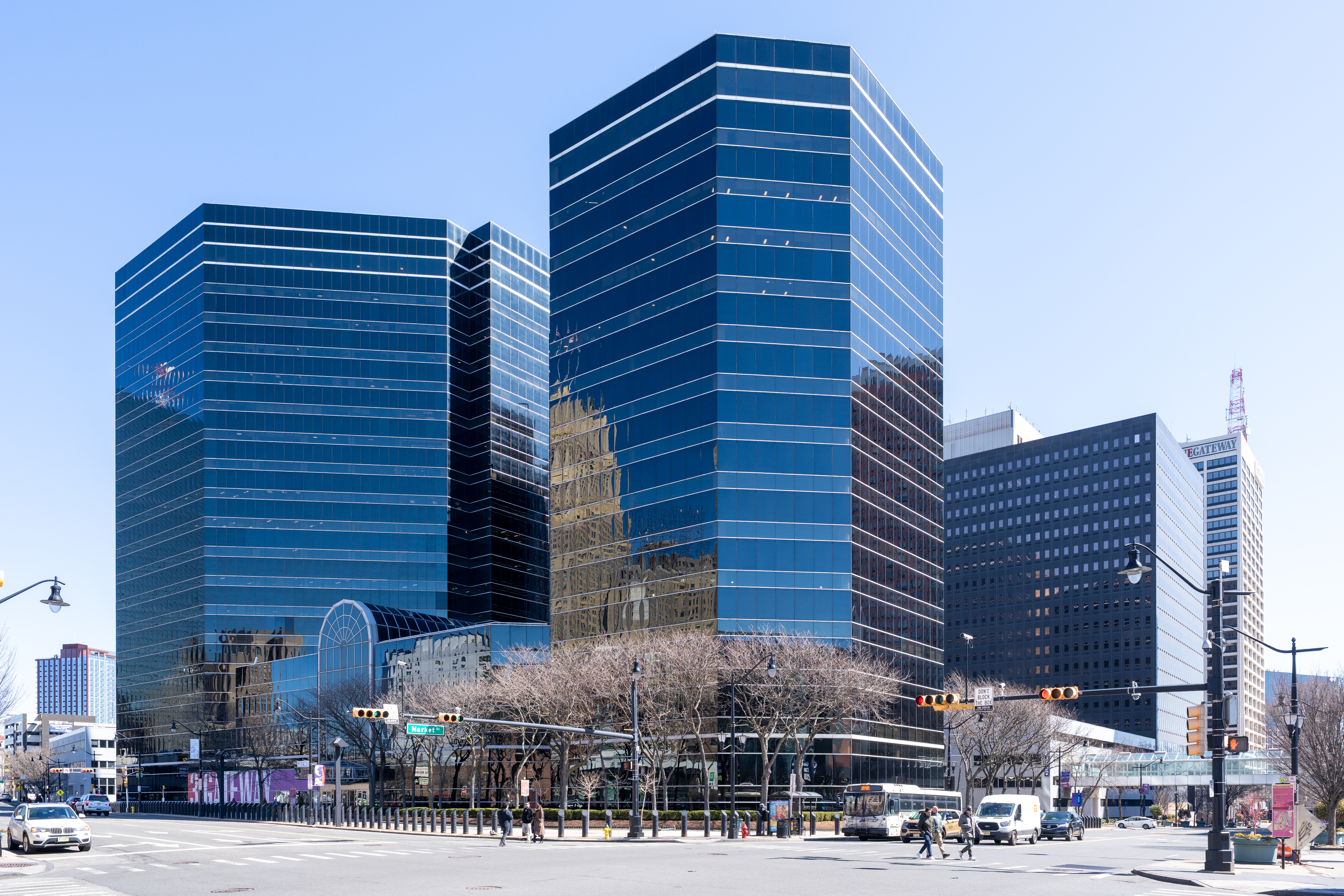
- Gateway Center in Newark, showing Buildings 4, 3, 2, and 1 from left to right (2026)
- Interactive map of the Gateway Center area

General information
- Type: office/commercial
- Location: Newark, New Jersey, U.S.
- Completed: 1971 (Gateway One and Two); 1985 (Gateway Three); 1988 (Gateway Four)
- Opening: 1972 (Gateway One and Two); 1985 (Gateway Three); 1988 (Gateway Four)
- Owner: Onyx Equities (Gateway One) ‌ Onyx Equities (Gateway Two) Onyx Equities (Gateway Four) Tahl-Propp Equities (Gateway Three)

Height
- Roof: 359 ft (109 m) (Gateway One); 272 ft (83 m) (Gateway Two); 244.61 ft (74.56 m) (Gateway Three); 155 ft (47 m) (Gateway Four)

Technical details
- Floor count: 30 (Gateway One); 18 (Gateway Two); 19 (Gateway Three); 16 (Gateway Four)
- Floor area: 466,919 sq ft (43,378.2 m^{2}) (Gateway One)

Design and construction
- Architects: Victor Gruen Associates (Gateway One and Two); Grad Associates (Gateway Three and Four)

The Gateway Center is a commercial complex in Newark, New Jersey. Located downtown just west of Newark Penn Station between Raymond Boulevard and Market Street. McCarter Highway runs through the complex. Skyways and pedestrian malls interconnect all of the office towers, a Hilton Hotel, the train station, and the Newark Legal Center. Built in phases in the late 20th century, the complex comprises some of the tallest buildings in the city, two designed by Victor Gruen Associates and two by Grad Associates.

== History ==
The Gateway Center was conceived as part of the "New Newark". Built in an urban renewal area that was considered blighted it was an early attempt to restore the reputation and rejuvenate business in Newark, which experienced severe urban decay in the previous decade. Prudential Insurance originally committed $18 million of long-term financing.

The first phase included Gateway One, a concourse and shopping mall, and the Downtowner Motor Inn, which later became a Hilton hotel. The second phase, Gateway Two, was offices of Western Electric Company. The complex was self-contained, allowing tenants and visitors to remain within the interior. A pedestrian mall one level above the street connected all parts of the complex connected to Penn Station by a glass-enclosed skywalk that extended over Raymond Plaza. Another skywalk extended across McCarter Highway to connect Gateway One and Gateway Two. The skywalks were intended to separate vehicular and pedestrian traffic and provided safety and security to wary commuters. These were completed by 1972. Gateway Three and Gateway Four were completed in 1985 and 1988, respectively. Original plans called for a Gateway Five and a Gateway Six, but are unbuilt, the available land leased as parking areas near the Prudential Center and Mulberry Commons.

In 2019, a major renovation of the public spaces began to better integrate the complex into the street level of the city.

== 2 Gateway ==
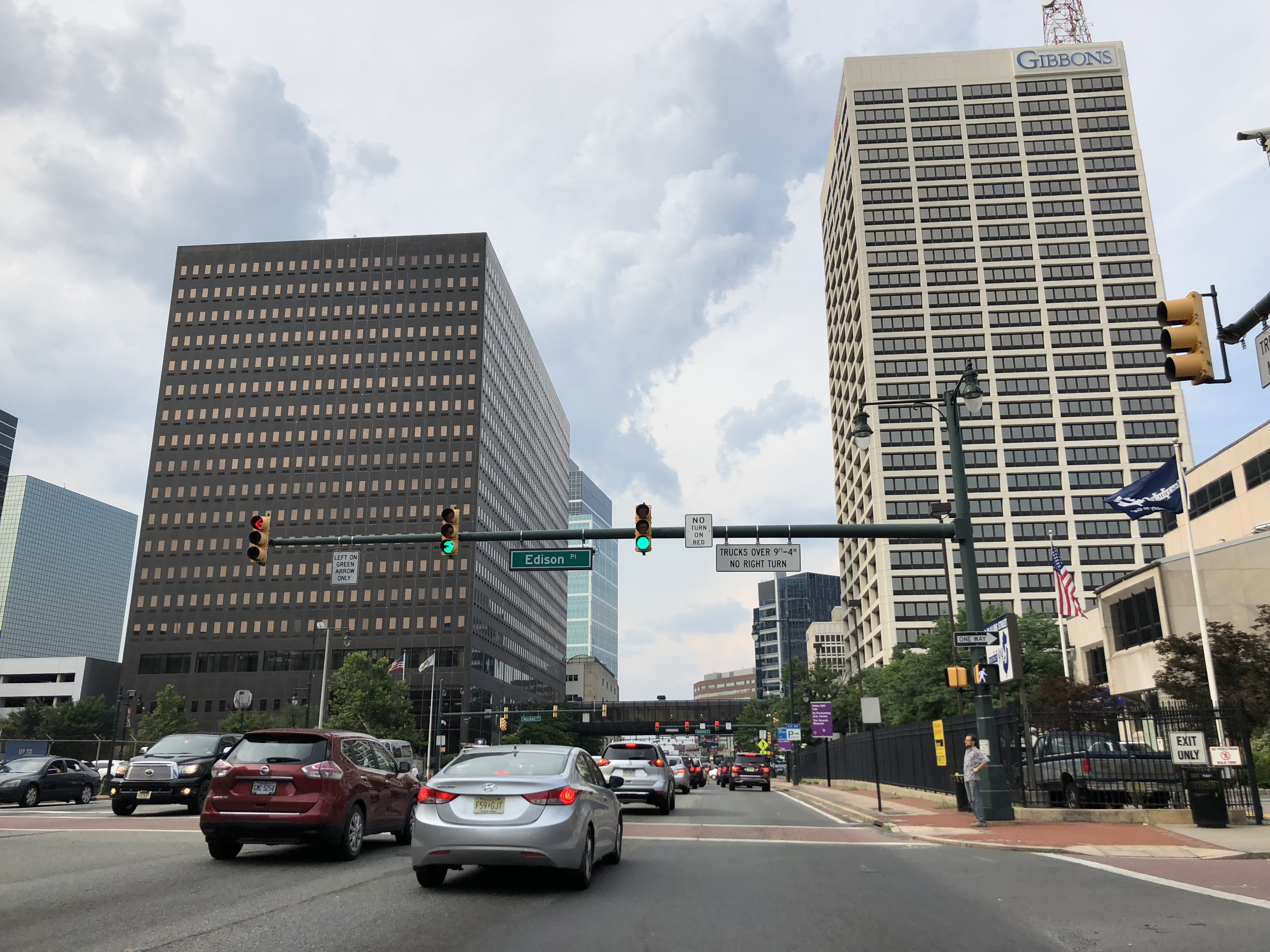
McCarter Highway between Gateway 1 (right) and Gateway 2

2 Gateway is a Class A office building on the corner of Market Street and McCarter Highway in the heart of Newark's "Billion Dollar Triangle". The 18-story building was completed in 1972 and underwent renovations in 1994 and 2015 It totals 832,550 square feet and is the first building in New Jersey to earn the Platinum certification from WiredScore for its best-in-class infrastructure and connectivity.

2 Gateway has been awarded Environmental Protection Agency's Energy Star label for its energy efficiency. The building contains amenities, which include a fitness center, banking facility, café and conferencing center.

In spring 2015, the Gateway Project, a gallery space, rentable artist studio and workspace, opened as a permanent fixture in 2 Gateway's concourse. NJTV (now known as NJ PBS), New Jersey's public television network, relocated its headquarters here in May 2015. Its Agnes Varis Studio allows people and commuters passing through the concourse a view into the studio which will be home to NJTV News with Mary Alice Williams.

After WNET announced that it would not renew its agreement with the New Jersey Public Broadcasting Authority, which owns NJ PBS, WNET closed down the studio on May 4, 2026. The station would continue to air its final newscasts remotely until September 2026.

== See also ==
- List of tallest buildings in Newark
