= Raid on Elizabethtown and Newark =

1780 military engagement

- Part of the American Revolutionary War
Date	January 25, 1780
Location	Elizabethtown and Newark, New Jersey
Result	British victory

Belligerents
United States	Great Britain

Commanders and leaders
Unknown	Col. Abraham van Buskirk; Capt. William Steward

Strength
Unknown	At least 400 infantry 60 light dragoons More than 40 loyalist militia

Casualties and losses
Approx. 67 captured.	2 killed, 3 captured

During the night of 25 January 1780, British forces staged simultaneous raids into Elizabethtown and Newark in New Jersey.

== Elizabethtown ==
Colonel Abraham van Buskirk led the attack into Elizabethtown with 300 infantry under his own command and 60 dragoons of the 17th Light Dragoons under the command of Captain William Steward. They also had a party of Loyalist militia, bringing the total number of this body to about 400. Col. van Buskirk's men were guided into the town by three local men, Job and Smith Hetfield, and Captain Cornelius Hetfield.

After crossing the ice from Staten Island to Trembly's Point, about 3 miles from Elizabethtown, the British infiltrated the town in two divisions. They plundered some houses and captured the American commander as well as two or three officers and forty-seven colonial soldiers. The loyalist militia burned the Presbyterian church and court house, against the wishes of Col. van Buskirk. By this time the alarm had been raised and the British retreated by way of De Hart's Point, burning De Hart's house on the way because it was frequently used by American forces.

== Newark ==
The second party crossed the frozen North River on sleighs to Paulus Hook and from there they marched through Bergen to Newark, which they entered in three divisions. The British captured fifteen men at the Newark Academy, of which one lieutenant escaped, and then set fire to it. They looted a few houses, including those of Justice Joseph Hedden and Robert Neil, Jr., whom they took as prisoners. Hedden was wearing only a shirt and stockings, but the British would not allow him to fully dress despite the bitter cold. Justice Hedden's wife attempted to intervene and received two bayonet wounds for it. It was later reported that Justice Hedden suffered severe frostbite during his ordeal. The entire attack took less than twenty minutes. The local militia pursued, capturing five British soldiers, two of whom died of hypothermia.

According to a British report, taking Hedden was never part of the original plan. His capture and subsequent treatment was at the hand of a loyalist named Walker who had been treated very poorly by Hedden in the past. When the officers later learned that he had not been allowed to dress, they provided him with some clothing.

Robert Neil, on the other hand, was a "sub-deputy quarter-master", and would frequently take crops and firewood from the property of known Tories for distribution to the American army.

== Aftermath ==
There was almost no long term strategic impact to this raid. Its primary purpose was to harass two colonial garrisons and to further personal vendettas.
