= Eleven 80 =

Eleven80
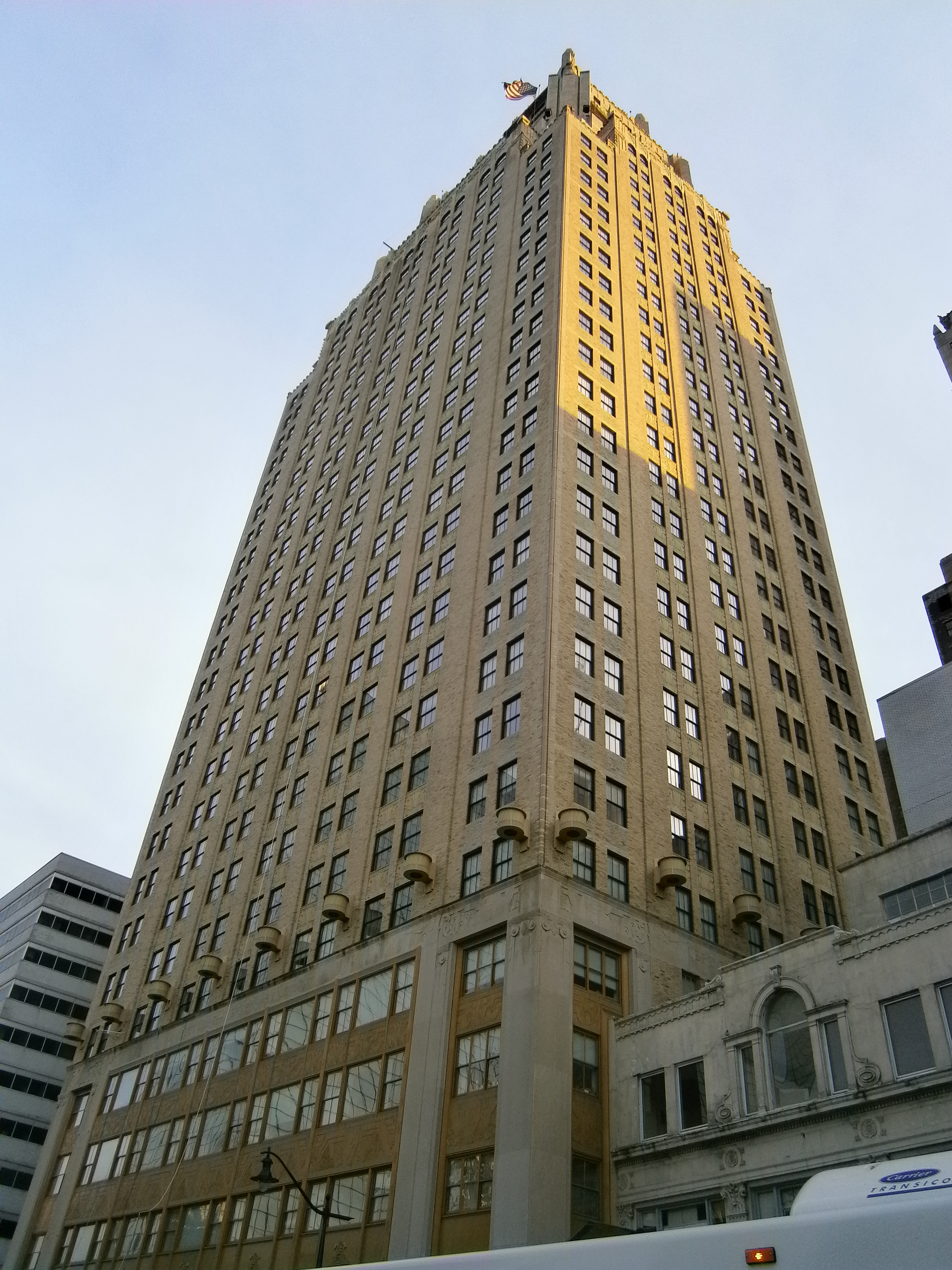
- Interactive map of the Eleven80 area

General information
- Status: Completed
- Type: Residential
- Location: 1180 Raymond Boulevard; Newark, New Jersey
- Coordinates: 40.7372°N 74.1700°W
- Construction started: 1929
- Completed: 1930

Height
- Roof: 137 m (449 ft)

Technical details
- Floor count: 35
- Floor area: 40,970 m^{2} (441,000 sq ft)
- Lifts/elevators: 4

Design and construction
- Architect: Frank Grad and Sons
- Developer: Cogswell Group

Eleven80 is a 137 m (449 ft) tall residential skyscraper in Newark, New Jersey, United States. Named for its address at 1180 Raymond Boulevard, Eleven80 is located in Downtown Newark, just north of Four Corners across from Military Park. A hallmark of the Newark skyline since its construction as a 36-story office building in 1930, it is noted for its Art Deco detail and ornamentation.

Designed by prominent Newark architect Frank Grad, it was the tallest building in the city until the National Newark Building opened the following year. Vacant since 1986, it was converted into residential use after a $120 million renovation by the Cogswell Group, and re-opened in 2006. The new apartments were the first unsubsidized rental units in downtown Newark since completion of the Pavilion and Colonnade Apartments in 1960.

The five-story base features terra cotta panels and metal spandrels decorated with geometric floral motifs. The letters "LN" can be seen above the third floor, for Lefcourt Newark, the original name of the building. Today it consists of 317 luxury studio, one- and two-bedroom rental residences, renting at prices below the New York City, Jersey City and Hoboken markets. The building features amenities including a health club, bowling alley, basketball court and a media room.

Eleven80, at left, during renovations, is near the National Newark Building and Prudential Headquarters

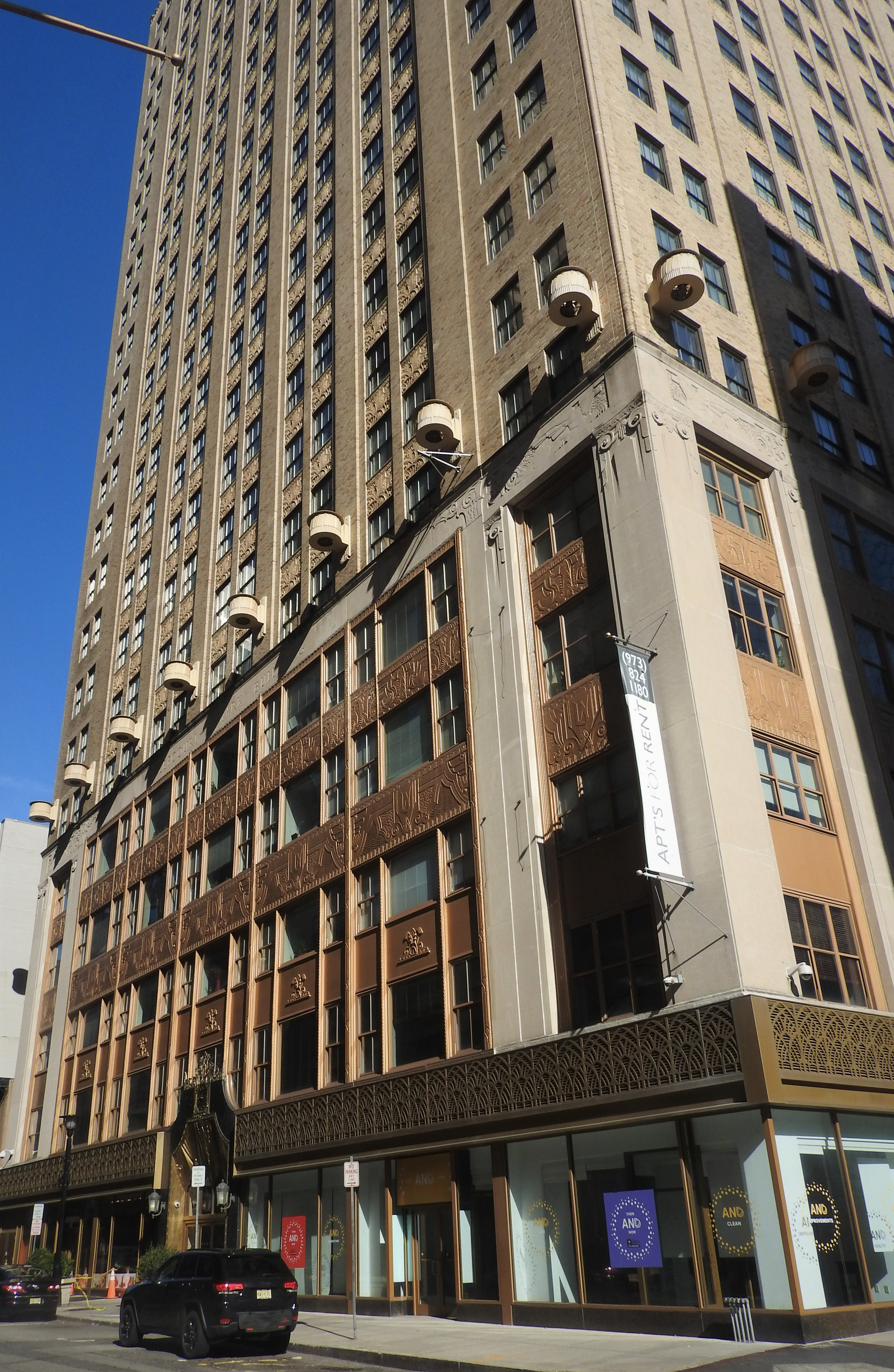
South side base

== See also ==
- American Insurance Company Building
- List of tallest buildings in Newark
