= List of public art in Newark, New Jersey =

This is a list of public art in Newark, New Jersey, in the United States. This list applies only to works of public art on permanent display in an outdoor public space and does not include artworks in museums. Public art may include sculptures, statues, monuments, memorials, murals, and mosaics. Many statues were erected in the early 20th century during the City Beautiful Movement and were concentrated in the city's original three commons, or town squares, and the county courthouse.

== List ==
Image	Title / subject	Location and coordinates	Date	Artist / designer	Type	Material	Dimensions	Designation	Owner / administrator	Wikidata	Notes
	An Historical Incident of November, 1764 aka Captive's Choice	Lincoln Park 40°43′35″N 74°10′45″W	1884 dedicated 1895	Chauncey Ives	Statue			NRHP contributing property	City of Newark		
	Behold	Essex County College 40.7387°N 74.1784°W	1990	Patrick Morelli	Statue	Bronze			State of New Jersey		
	Bust of John Fitzgerald Kennedy	Military Park 40°44′17″N 74°10′13″W	1965	Jacques Lipchitz	Bust			NRHP contributing property	City of Newark		
	Fairmount Heights Switching Station	Fairmont 40°44′48″N 74°11′34″W	2018	Adjaye Associates and 14 others	Murals and colonnade	Various	30 feet (9.1 m) "art wall'		Public Service Enterprise Group		
More images	First Landing Party of the Founders of Newark	Grounds of the New Jersey Performing Arts Center near NJPAC/Center Street station 40°44′22″N 74°09′58″W	1916	Gutzon Borglum	Monument	Marble	9 feet (2.7 m) tall	NRHP	City of Newark	Q65059284	
	Indian and the Puritan	Washington Park 40°44′39″N 74°10′12″W	1916	Gutzon Borglum	Monument	Marble and bronze lamp standard		NRHP	City of Newark	Q14705651	
	Ironbound Immigrants Memorial Monument	Peter Francisco Park; Ironbound at Penn Station 40°43′59″N 74°09′50″W	2018	Camilo Satiro	Sculpture	Granite	16 feet (4.9 m) tall 25 feet (7.6 m) long 9 feet (2.7 m) wide weight: 2 tons.				
More images	Justice	Government Center 40°43′48″N 74°10′23″W	1991	Diana K. Moore	Sculpture	Concrete	11 ft (3.4 m) tall, 8.8 ft (2.7 m) wide, 9 ft (2.7 m) long			Q14705682	
More images	Philip Kearny	Military Park 40°44′22″N 74°10′08″W	1880	Henry Kirke Brown	Statue	Bronze		NRHP contributing property	City of Newark		
	Newark Light Rail	various stations		multiple including Willie Cole, Grigory Gurevich	Murals, sculptures						
	Newark Murals: {Portraits}	Stone viaduct of the Northeast Corridor facing McCarter Highway 40°43′30″N 74°10′28″W	2016	multiple	Mural		1.39 miles (2.24 km) long				
More images	Planting the Standard of Democracy	Lincoln Park 40°43′37″N 74°10′39″W	1923	Charles Henry Niehaus	Statue	Bronze		NRHP contributing property			
	Prudential Lions	Essex County Courthouse 40°44′15″N 74°10′47″W	1901	Karl Bitter	Statue	Limestone		NRHP (contributing property)			Originally created for Prudential Headquarters Home Office
More images	Seated Lincoln	Essex County Courthouse 40°44′14″N 74°10′41″W	1911	Gutzon Borglum	Statue	Bronze		NRHP		Q7441987	
	Shadow of a Face	Harriet Tubman Square 40°44′36″N 74°10′12″W	2023	Nina Cooke John	Sculpture		25 feet (7.6 m) tall x 40 feet (12 m) wide		City of Newark		
More images	Statute of Bartolomeo Colleoni	Lincoln Park 40°43′36″N 74°10′48″W	1916	J. Massey Rhind after Andrea del Verrocchio	Statue	Bronze	45 feet (14 m) tall	NRHP contributing property	City of Newark		Inspired by the Equestrian statue of Bartolomeo Colleoni
	Statue of Christopher Columbus	Washington Park 40°44′36″N 74°10′12″W	1927 removed 2020	Giuseppe Ciochetti	Statue	Bronze		NRHP contributing property	City of Newark		
	Statue of George Floyd	Newark City Hall 40°43′54″N 74°10′26″W	2021	Stanley J. Watts	Statue	Bronze				Q107404474	
	Statue of Hockey Player	Prudential Center 40°44′05″N 74°10′11″W	2009	Jon Krawczyk	Statue	Stainless steel	22-foot (6.7 m) tall				
	Statue of Martin Luther King Jr.	Essex County Courthouse 40°44′13″N 74°10′47″W	2015 and 2021	Jay Warren	Sculpture	Bronze			Essex County		
	The Commuters	Penn Station 40°44′5″N 74°9′51″W	1984	Grigory Gurevich	Sculpture	Bronze					
	Truth and Power	Essex County Courthouse 40°44′13″N 74°10′42″W	1906	Andrew O'Connor	Companion Sculpture	Bronze			Essex County		
More images	Equestrian statue of George Washington	Washington Park 40°44′33″N 74°10′11″W	1912	J. Massey Rhind	Sculpture	Bronze	8 feet 6 inches (2.59 m) high, 5 feet 6 inches (1.68 m) wide, 12 feet 6 inches (3.81 m) long	NRHP contributing property	City of Newark		
More images	Wars of America	Military Park 40°44′20″N 74°10′11″W	1926	Gutzon Borglum	Sculpture	Bronze		NRHP	City of Newark	Q7970861	

== Memorials and tributes ==
In addition to aforementioned 2009 stainless steel sculpture of a hockey player Jon Krawczyk also created The Salute, a statue of the longtime New Jersey Devils goaltender Martin Brodeur, installed outside Prudential Center in 2016. A bronze statue, created by sculptor Thomas Jay Warren, was dedicated to the memory of Althea Gibson in Branch Brook Park in March 2012 In June 2012, a life-size bronze statue of Roberto Clemente by sculptor Susan Wagner was also unveiled in the park.

Throughout the city are memorials and tributes to local sons and daughters, local and national civic leaders, and political, religious, and sports figures.

Subject	Role	Image	Artist/Year	Location	Notes
Armed Forces Memorial	Dedicated to Jorge Oliveira 10-year veteran of the Essex County Sheriff's Office killed while serving in Afghanistan War		Thomas Jay Warren; 2014	Veterans Memorial Park; 40°44′19″N 74°10′57″W	
Seth Boyden	Inventor		Karl Gerhardt; 1890	Washington Park; 40°44′36″N 74°10′13″W	
William J. Brennan, Jr.	US Supreme Court Justice		Thomas Jay Warren; 2010	Essex County Government Complex; 40°44′15″N 74°10′46″W	
Martin Brodeur aka The Salute	New Jersey Devils ice hockey player		Jon Krawczyk; 2016	Prudential Center; 40°43′57″N 74°10′15″W	
Brendan Byrne	Governor of New Jersey		Thomas Jay Warren; 2013	Essex County Government Complex	
Frances Xavier Cabrini aka Mother Cabrini	First U.S. citizen to be canonized a saint by the Catholic Church		1958	Mother Cabrini Park in the Ironbound near Newark Penn Station; 40°44′01″N 74°09′48″W	
Roberto Clemente	Baseball right fielder for the Pittsburgh Pirates inducted into the National Baseball Hall of Fame in 1973		Susan Wagner; 2012	Branch Brook Park; 40°45′45″N 74°10′41″W	
Monsignor Doane	Rector at St. Patrick's Pro-Cathedral and civic leader		William Clark Noble; 1908	Military Park-Doane Park; 40°44′27″N 74°10′08″W	
Peter Francisco	Portuguese-born American patriot and soldier in the American Revolutionary War		1976	Peter Francisco Park in the Ironbound near Newark Penn Station; 40°43′59″N 74°09′52″W	
Frederick T. Frelinghuysen	US Senator and United States Secretary of State		Karl Gerhardt; 1894	Military Park; 40°44′25″N 74°10′09″W	
Althea Gibson	Tennis pro and educator		Thomas Jay Warren; 2012	Branch Brook Park; 40°46′42″N 74°10′26″W	
Kenneth A. Gibson	36th Mayor of Newark		Thomas Jay Warren	Newark City Hall; 40°43′55″N 74°10′26″W	
Joseph E. Haynes	20th Mayor of Newark		1917	Pequannock Gate, Roseville; 40°46′05″N 74°10′55″W	
Felix Mendelssohn	composer		Joseph M. Didusch & Son; 1903 rededicated 2017	Branch Brook Park; 40°45′22″N 74°10′59″W	
Franklin Murphy	Governor of New Jersey; Founder Murphy Varnish Works		J. Massey Rhind; 1925	Weequahic Park; 40°42′32″N 74°11′58″W	
Frederick Law Olmsted	"the father of landscape architecture"		Thomas Jay Warren; 2018	Branch Brook Park	
Rosa Parks	Civil rights activist		Thomas Jay Warren; 2014	Essex County Government Complex	
Donald M. Payne	US Representative; the first African American Congressperson from New Jersey		Thomas Jay Warren; 2011	Essex County Government Complex	
Sarah Vaughn; Wayne Shorter	Singer and musician			Newark Light Rail Broad Street Extension stations	

== See also ==
- Public Sculpture in Newark, New Jersey Multiple Property Submission
- Washington Park (Newark)
- Kea Tawana
- List of public art in Jersey City, New Jersey
