= Government Center, Newark =

District in Newark, New Jersey, US

Coordinates: 40°43′51″N 74°10′23″W

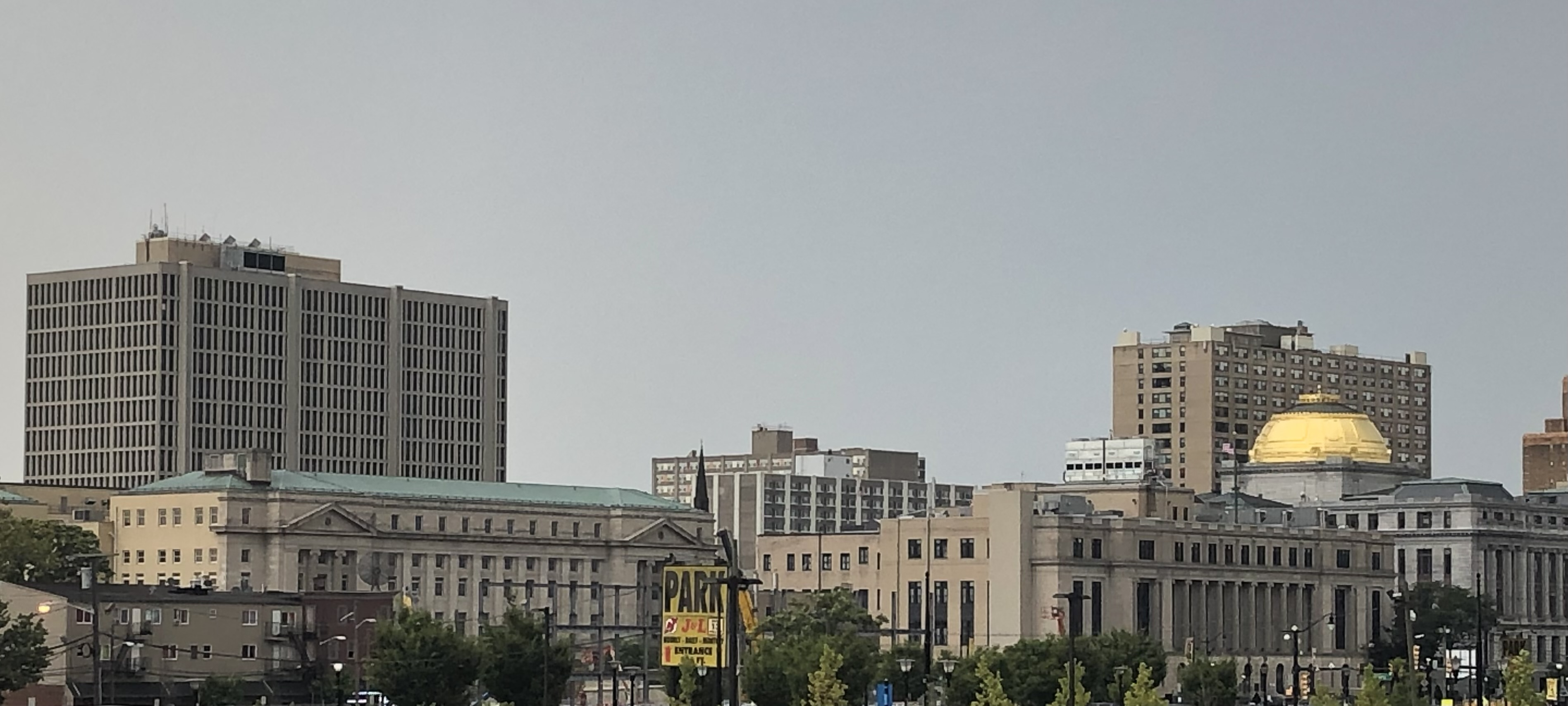
View looking southeast to Government Center

Government Center is a district in Downtown Newark, New Jersey, bounded by Broad Street, Green Street, Mulberry Street, and Beach Street and named for the presence of government buildings centered around a plaza called Federal Square. Grace Episcopal Church, a national historic site, where the tune of America the Beautiful was written, is within the area. The larger-than-life bust Justice, a statue of George Floyd and another of Mayor Kenneth A. Gibson are in the district.

Government Center is just south of the Four Corners Historic District and the Prudential Center and north of Newark Symphony Hall. Federal Square had once been called Vroom Alley, but was later renamed. To the east along Mulberry Street is the area that at one time was Newark's Chinatown.

While Government Center is the concentration of federal and municipal buildings, Newark is also the county seat of in Essex County. County government buildings are located at the Essex County Government Complex, the heart of which is the historic Essex County Courthouse, home of the New Jersey Superior Court.

== Government buildings ==
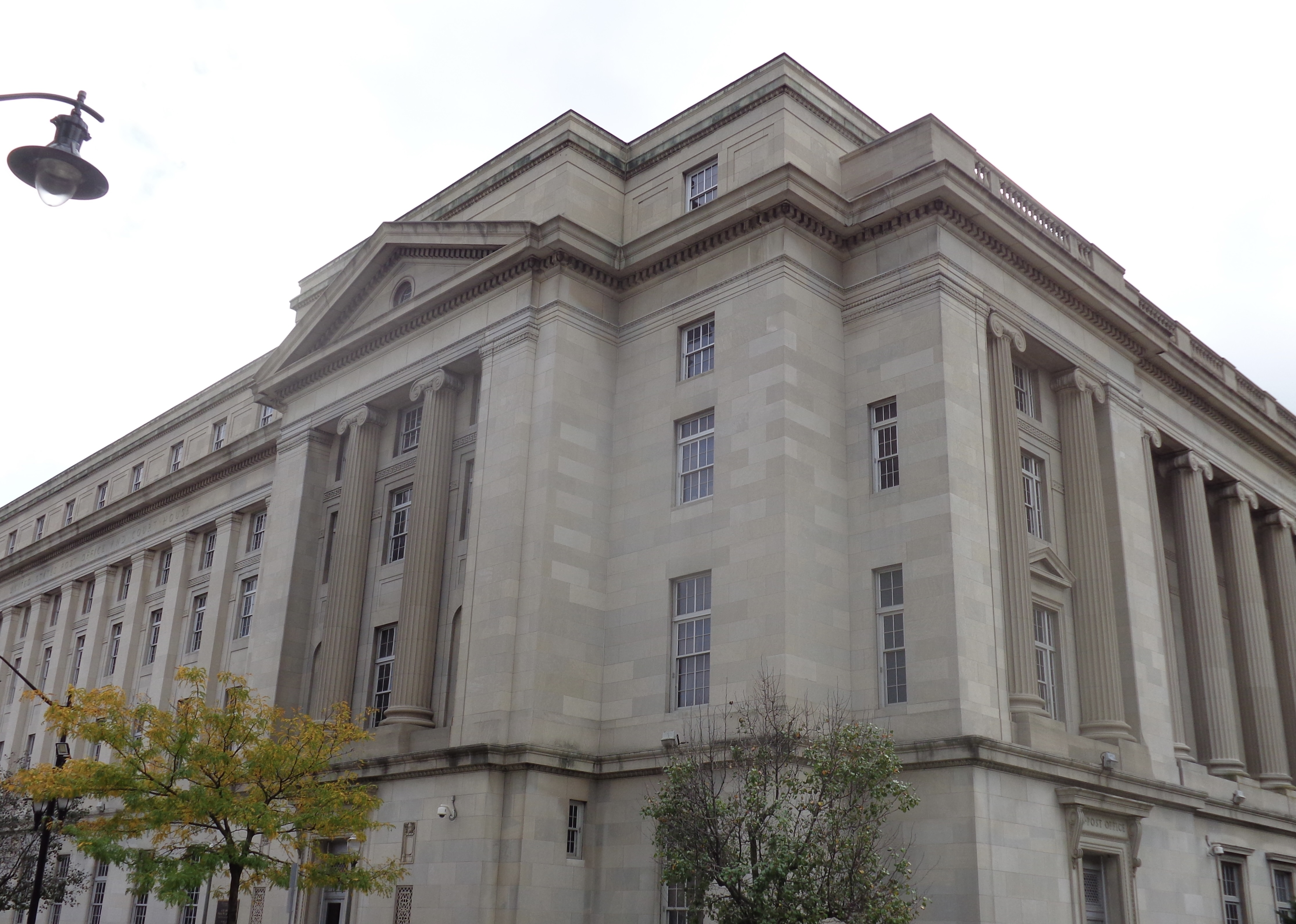
US Post Office and Courthouse

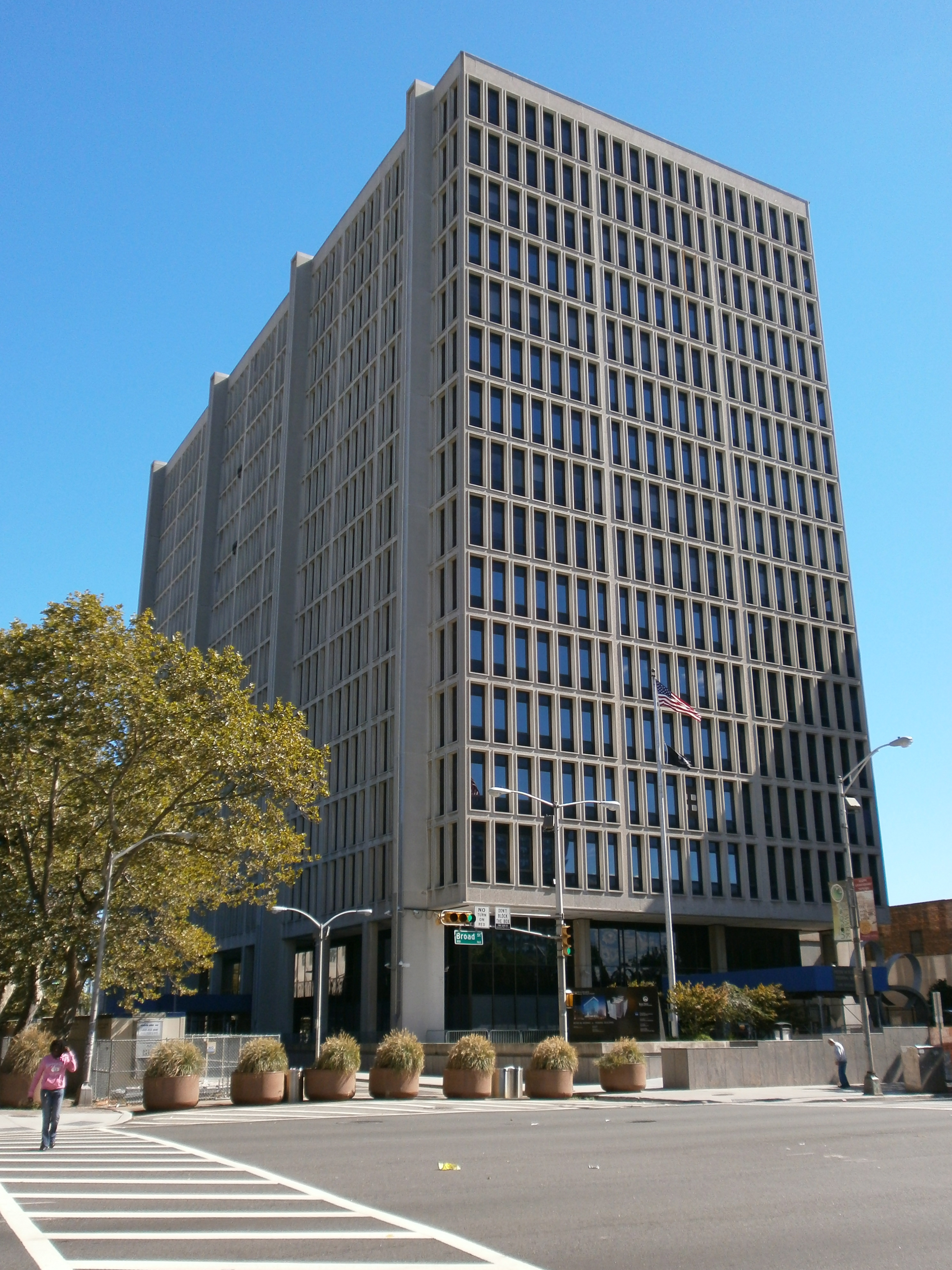
Rodino Federal Building

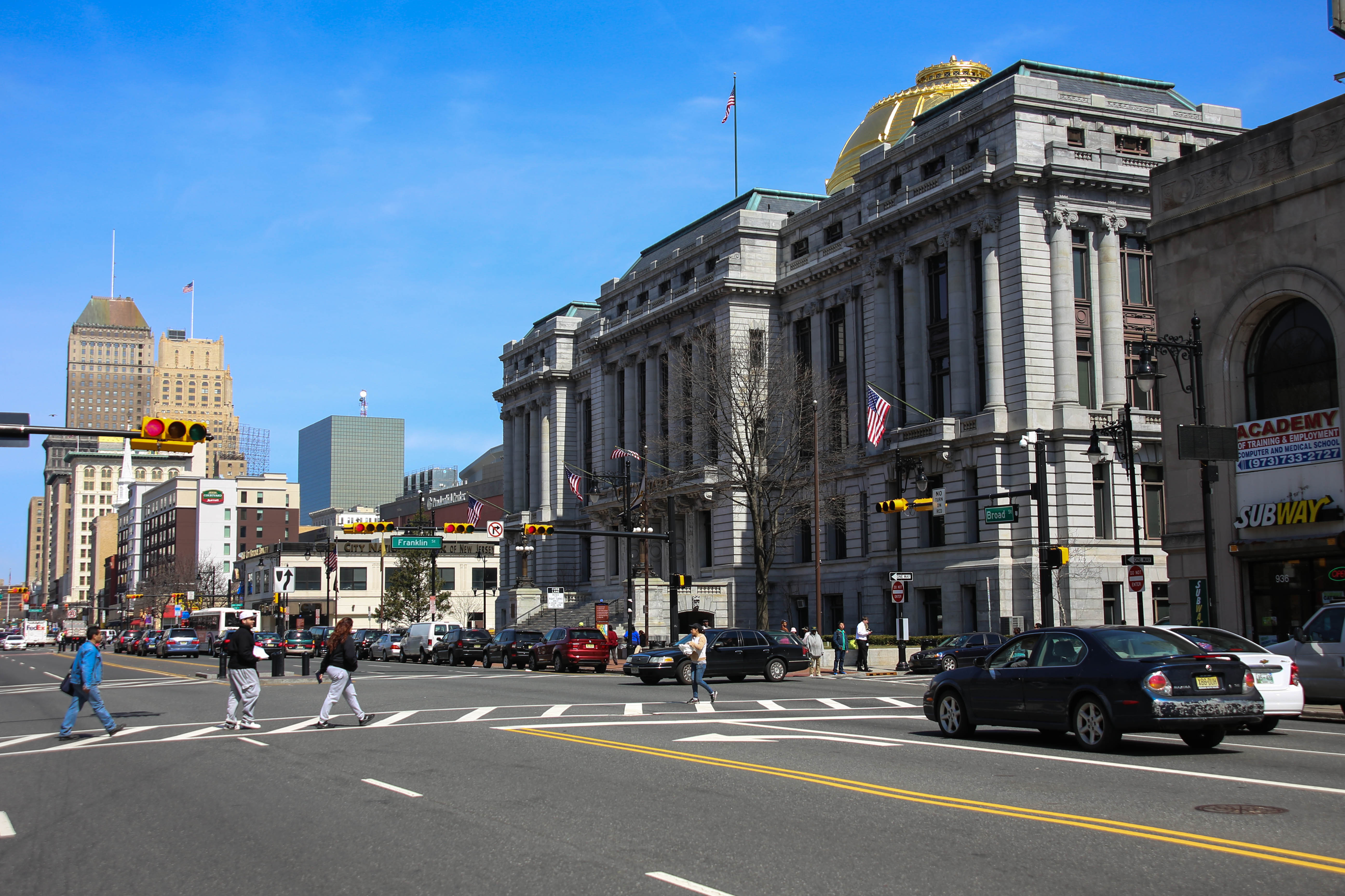
City Hall

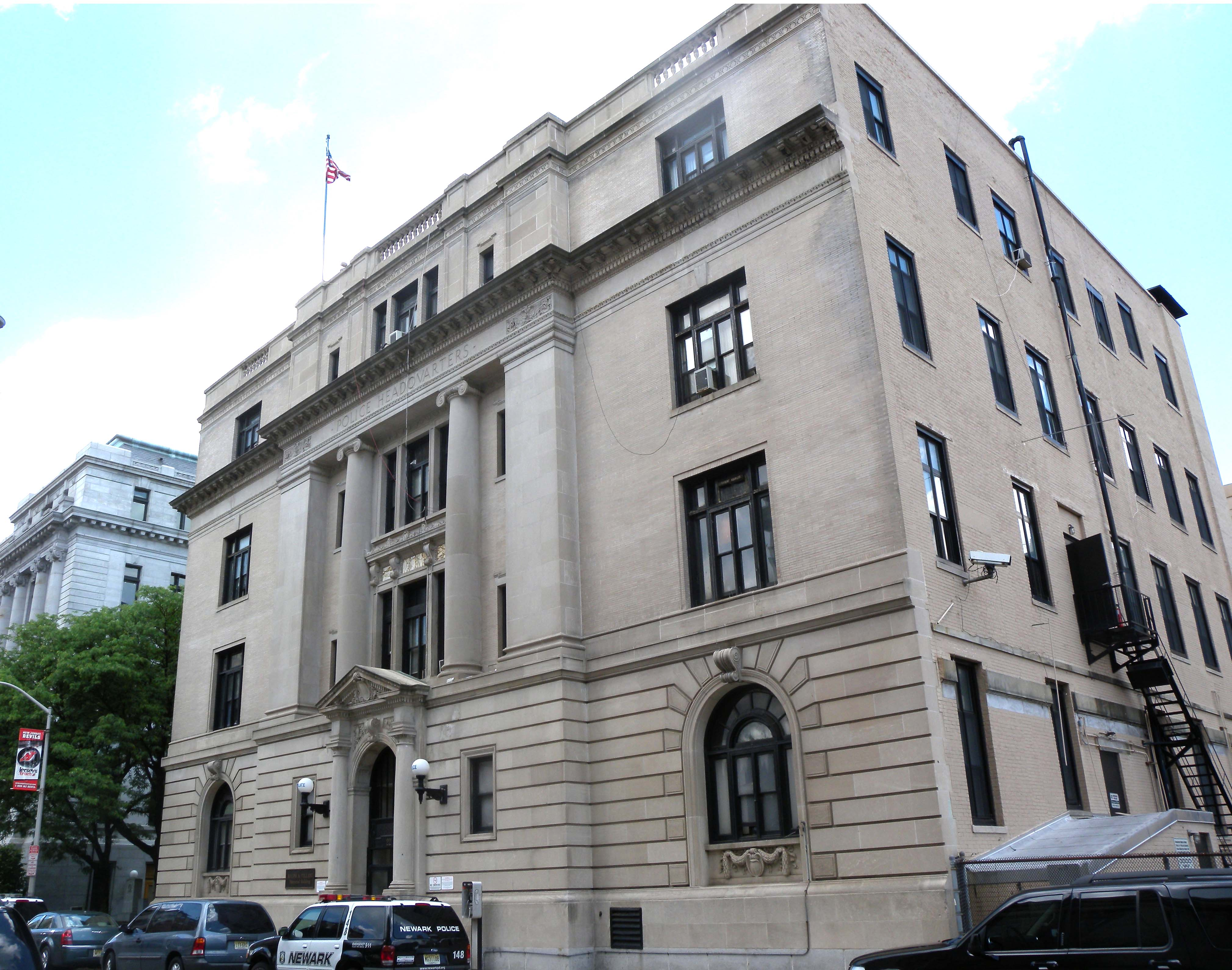
Villani Building (former police headquarters)

Building	Image	Street address	Organization	Dates of use	Notes	References
Frank R. Lautenberg Post Office & Courthouse		2 Federal Square	US District Court for NJ	1936–present	Following design of George Oakley Totten Jr. Dedicated to Frank Lautenberg, U.S. Senator from New Jersey ||	
Martin Luther King Building & U.S. Courthouse		50 Walnut Street	US District Court for NJ	1992–present	Site of sculpture Justice; Named for civil rights movement leader Martin Luther King Jr.	
Peter Rodino, Jr. Federal Building		972 Broad Street	U.S. Immigration and Customs Enforcement Field Office	1967–present	Named for US Representative Peter Rodino, Jr. (NJ-10)	
Newark City Hall		920 Broad Street	Municipal Council of Newark; Mayor of Newark	1902–present	Statues of George Floyd and Kenneth A. Gibson, Mayor of Newark	
Newark Municipal Court		31 Green Street				
Ralph A. Villani Building; Former Newark Police Headquarters		22 Franklin Street	Newark Police Department		Named for Ralph A. Villani, Mayor of Newark (1949–1953)	
Newark Parking Authority		47-63 Green Street	Newark Parking Authority	2019–present		

== See also ==
- Gibraltar Building
- Newark Legal Center

== See also ==
- Federal courthouses in New Jersey
- County courthouses in New Jersey
- National Register of Historic Places listings in Essex County, New Jersey
