= Statue of George Floyd =

2021 statue in Newark, New Jersey, United States

- The statue in 2021
- Artist: Stanley Watts
- Year: 2021
- Medium: Bronze
- Subject: George Floyd
- Weight: 700 pounds (320 kg)
- Location: Newark, New Jersey, U.S.; 40.7318°N 74.1740°W

A bronze statue of George Floyd (1973–2020), an African-American man who was murdered by police in Minneapolis, was completed by Stanley Watts and unveiled in 2021. It is situated outside Newark, New Jersey's City Hall in Government Center.

== Description ==
Weighing 700 pounds (320 kg), the statue is of Floyd sitting relaxed on a bench. Watts said of the statue that "The world needed a peaceful George".

== History ==
The statue was commissioned by Leon Pickney. The piece was briefly displayed at Faison Firehouse Theater in Harlem, New York. It was donated to the city of Newark and installed on Juneteenth, 2021.

Days after installation, on the night of June 24, the sculpture was vandalized. The face of the statue was painted black, with the name of a neo-Nazi group painted on its torso. The paint was removed shortly after by the Newark Public Works Department.

== See also ==
- Black Lives Matter art
- List of public art in Newark, New Jersey
- Memorials to George Floyd
