= Stanley Watts =

Stanley Watts may refer to:

- Stan Watts (1911–2000), American basketball
- Stanley J. Watts (born 1961), American artist and sculptor
