= Statue of Martin Luther King Jr. (Newark) =

Statue in Newark, New Jersey, U.S.

Coordinates: 40°44′13″N 74°10′47″W

There are two statues of Rev. Martin Luther King Jr. in Newark, New Jersey. Both are located on the Essex County Government Complex at its newest addition, the Martin Luther King Justice Building.

== 2015 statue ==
Statue of Martin Luther King Jr.
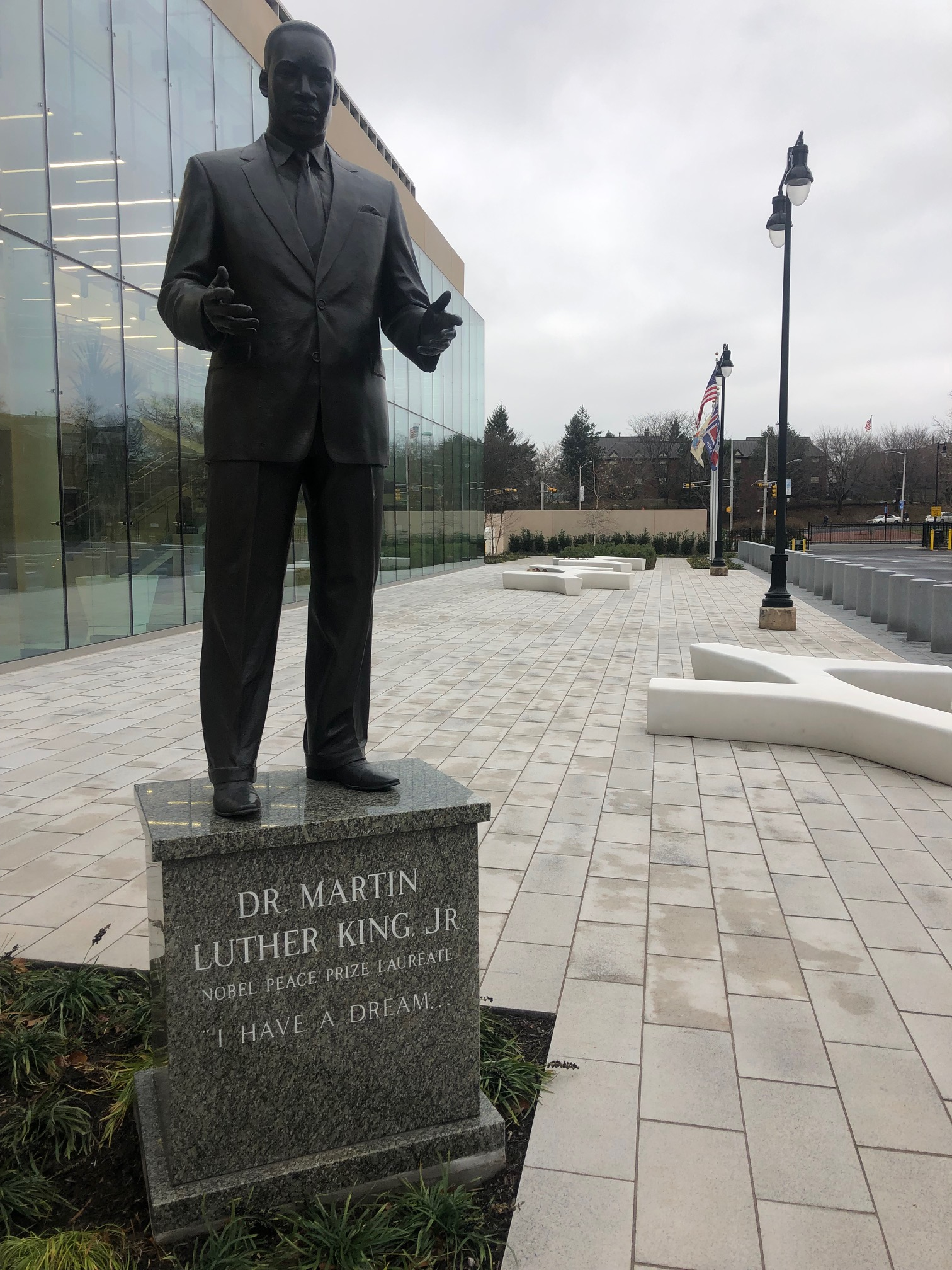
- Artist: Thomas Jay Warren
- Year: Official opening October 14, 2015
- Type: Bronze figure atop granite pedestal
- Dimensions: 8 ft (2.4 m) (height)
- Location: Essex County Courthouse Newark, New Jersey, U.S.

The 2015 statue by Thomas Jay Warren was unveiled on the plaza near the Essex County Hall of Records, on October 14, 2015. The 8 feet (2.4 m) tall bronze statue stands on a 3 feet (0.91 m) tall granite pedestal and depicts King with his hands outstretched and his head tilted slightly downward so onlookers can see his face. The pedestal is engraved with "I Have a Dream", which references King's famous speech during the March on Washington for Jobs and Freedom. It notes his Nobel Peace Prize and is engraved with words ascribed to King: Hope, Equality, Peace, Courage, Love and Respect. An accompanying plaque reads:

"At a time in American history, when the need for change was evident, Martin Luther King, Jr., a young Georgia minister, rose to lead a nationwide civil rights movement. He guided a bus boycott that ended segregated seating, supported integrated groups of 'Freedom Riders' who shattered old, southern 'Jim Crow' laws, assisted young people conducting 'sit-ins' at segregated lunch counters, and led hundreds of peaceful protest marches. Brilliant, dignified, persuasive and eloquent, he always stressed non-violence, even in the face of adversity. He inspired thousands of people, of all colors, races and religions, to join hands, and more than 200,000 supporters gathered in Washington, DC, for his iconic 'I have a dream…' oration. As President of the Southern Christian Leadership Council, he brought attention to sources of national discrimination, helping to gain passage of the 1964 Civil Rights Act, forever changing the course of American history. Dr. King was awarded the Nobel Peace Prize for his work, on this very day, 50 years ago. Assassinated in 1968, he is one of the most respected and revered of all Human Rights activists."

"I show him at a younger age than you mostly see him," the sculptor said. "I tried to capture him at the time he visited Newark." Warren, based in Oregon, also created statues of Rosa Park, Justice William J. Brennan, Jr., Governor Brendan Byrne and Congressman Donald M. Payne at the Essex County Government Complex and the statue of Althea Gibson in Branch Brook Park.

The statue was relocated to the jurors entrance of the new courthouse building.

== 2021 statue ==
Statue of Martin Luther King Jr.
- Artist: Thomas Jay Warren
- Year: Official opening June 19, 2021
- Type: Bronze figure atop granite pedestal
- Dimensions: 22 ft (6.7 m) (height)
- Location: Essex County Courthouse Newark, New Jersey

The 2021 statue in front of the new justice building was also created by Jay Warren. The 22 feet (6.7 m) bronze sculpture is placed on an 8 feet (2.4 m) granite pedestal. It depicts King with his right arm gesturing, his hand is outstretched, and he is holding papers that signify victories in the Civil Rights movement – the Civil Rights Act of 1964 and the Voting Rights Act of 1965. The engraving quotes King: "We must learn to live together as brothers or perish together as fools. But I know somehow, that only when it is dark enough, can you see the stars. I have decided to stick with love, hate is too great a burden to bear. Life's most persistent and urgent question is, What are you doing for others?".

The interior lobby of the building serves is monument to the life and legacy of King. It includes a large mural with photographs of and quotes by King and a large-screen television which plays a video of him. Both works were created by Terri Haskins of Hackensack. Also in the lobby is a large bronze bust, also created by Warren, of Congressman and civil rights advocate John Lewis of Georgia, a close friend and associate of Dr. King.

== Behold ==
The original statue Behold, created by Patrick Morelli, is located at Martin Luther King Jr. National Historical Park in Atlanta. A second casting was commissioned by the New Jersey Martin Luther King, Jr. Commemorative Commission, a government agency within the New Jersey Department of State. It was placed at Essex County College in Newark and dedicated in a ceremony with Mayor Sharpe James in 1990.

== See also ==
- List of public art in Newark, New Jersey
- Memorials to Martin Luther King Jr.
- List of streets named after Martin Luther King Jr.
- Martin Luther King, Jr. Memorial (Jersey City)
- Civil rights movement in popular culture
