= Essex County Government Complex =

Coordinates: 40.737201°N 74.178822°W

The Essex County Government Complex is located in Newark, the county seat of Essex County, New Jersey, U.S. at west of end of Market Street in Downtown. It is home to the Essex County Executive, the Board of County Commissioners, and the constitutional officers of the county: the County Clerk, the County Surrogate, and the County Sheriff as well as the County Register. The Essex County Prosecutor's Office and the 5th Vininage of New Jersey Superior Court is based at the government complex, across from which is the campus of Essex County College. The complex comprises various buildings built since 1904, when the historic courthouse was constructed, and is adorned with public art, including statues and busts of prominent civic leaders. Numerous state and county offices are located at the complex, which also has extensive parking facilities.

== Essex County Courthouse ==
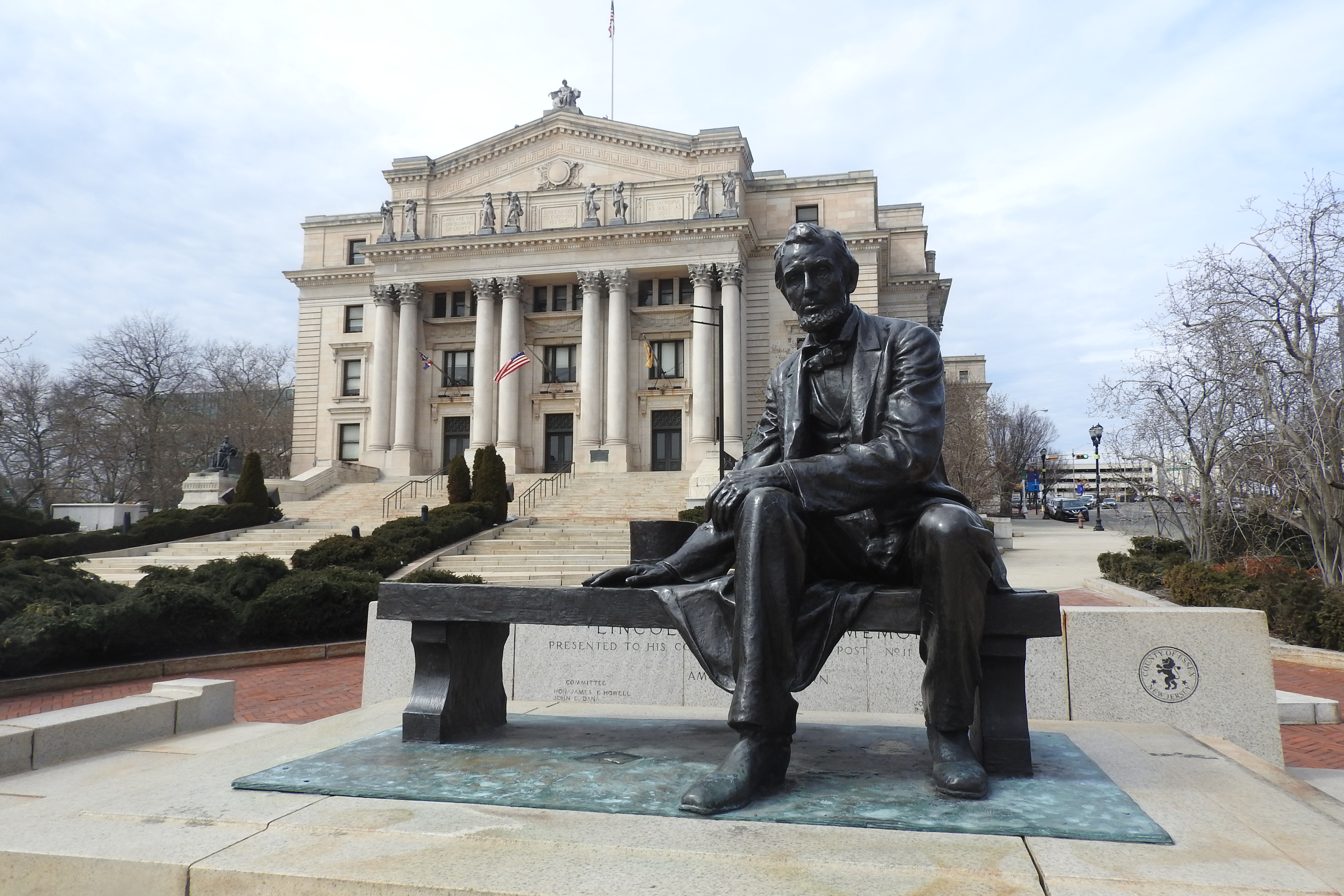
Seated Lincoln and historic courthouse

The Essex County Courthouse was completed in 1904 and was added to the National Register of Historic Places in 1975.

The building, designed by Cass Gilbert, has a four-story rotunda topped with a Tiffany skylight. It features artwork from some of the most well known artists of the American Renaissance period The main façade is adorned with nine sculptures by Piccirilli Brothers. Seated Lincoln by Gutzon Borglum sits on the plaza in front of the courthouse.

== Essex County Hall of Records ==
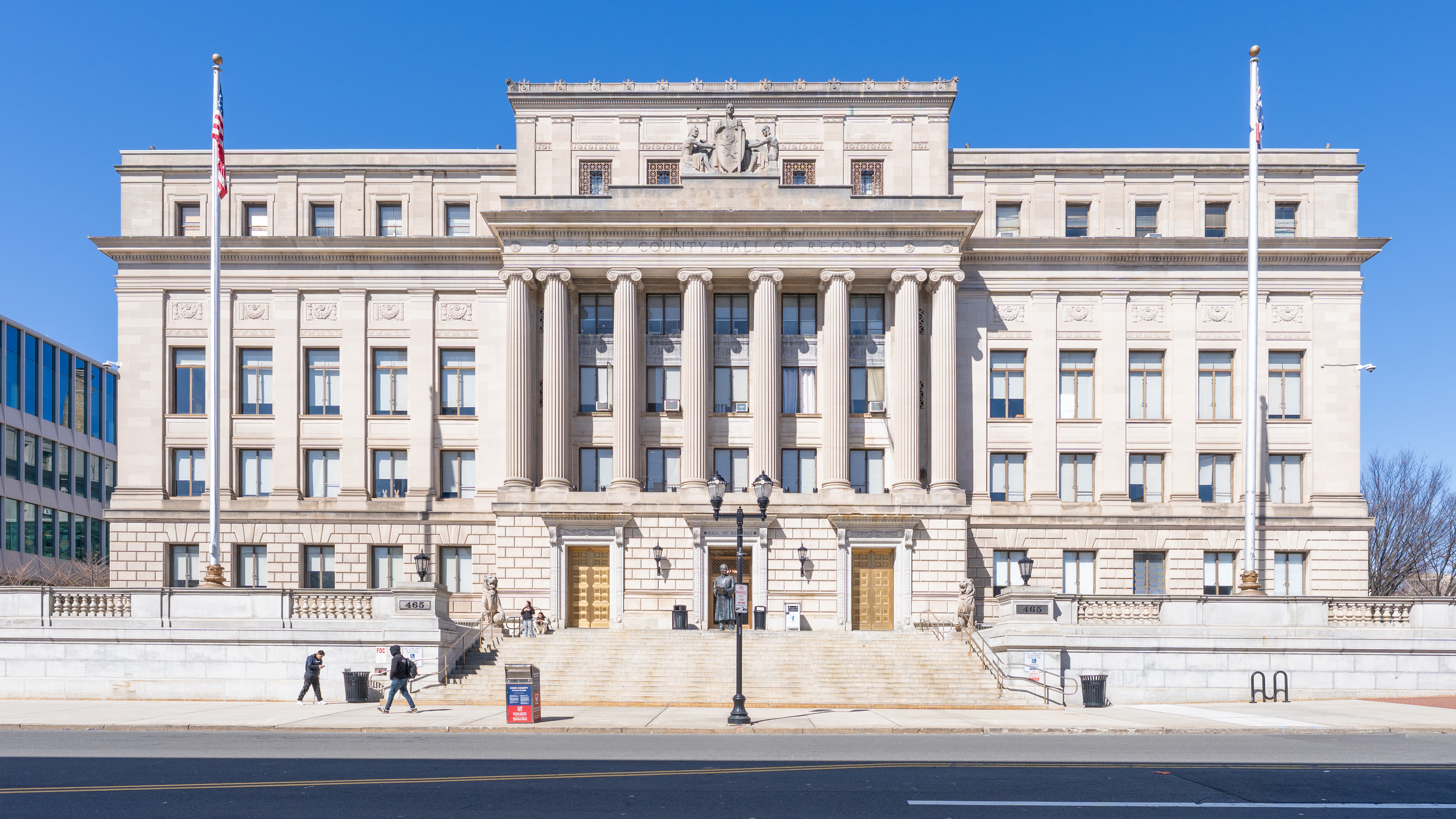
Hall of Records

The Neo-Classical Essex County Hall of Records at 465 Martin Luther King Jr. Boulevard was designed by Guilbert and Betelle and built between 1925 and 1927 (cornerstone 1926). The four-story limestone structure is behind and across the street from the historic courthouse. A statue of U.S. Supreme Justice William J. Brennan Jr. stands at the front of the building. The Essex County Register of Deeds and Mortgages are headquartered in the building.

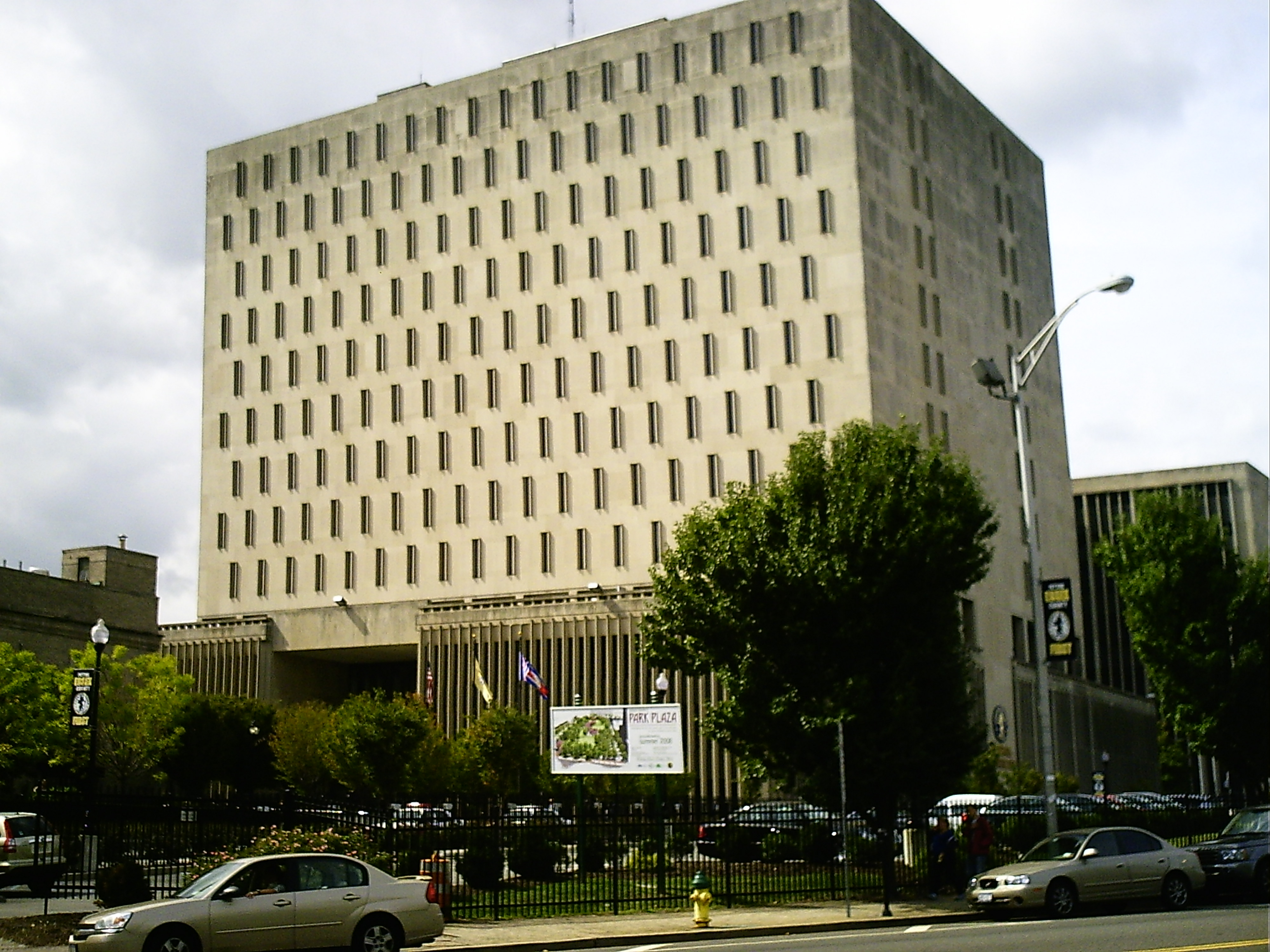
Essex County Veterans Courthouse

== Essex County Veterans Courthouse ==
Built between 1967 – 1970, the modern architecture Essex County Veterans Courthouse was designed by Robert H. Fava, Richard O. Becker, John B. Murray and Warren E Bendixen. The thirteen-story concrete and glass structure is west of the old courthouse at 50 West Market Street. The lower three stories form the extended base on the east and west sides and have vertical concrete pillars with recessed glass walls. The central entrance is recessed. The third story has columns supporting the top nine stories which have narrow vertical windows. The Essex County Sheriff's Office headquarters is located on the second floor of the building. The Essex County Prosecutor's Office is headquartered in the building. A statue of a seated Rosa Parks is situated on the plaza in front of the courthouse.

== Leroy F. Smith Jr. Public Safety Building ==
Leroy F. Smith Jr. Public Safety Building was originally built as a county jail at the same time as the adjacent 1970 Veterans Courthouse. It replaced the Old Essex County Jail, parts of which dated from the 19th century and had become outdated and inadequate. In 2004, inmates were moved to a new jail on Doremus Avenue.

The 13-story building at Howard Street and Nelson Place is across from Veterans Memorial Park. It was rehabilitated/retrofitted to offices 2008–2010 at the cost of $24 million, its 13th floor becoming a conference center and renumbered to become the 14th. It was dedicated to Leroy F. Smith Jr., associate director of Emergency Medical Services at UMDNJ-The University Hospital for 38 years, who had once entered the jail alone and negotiated the release of a hostage held during prison strike.

Among other, it houses offices of the New Jersey Superior Court, Appellate Division, the New Jersey Office of Homeland Security and Preparedness, and the Essex County Schools of Technology. Congressman Donald Payne Jr. maintains his New Jersey office in the building.

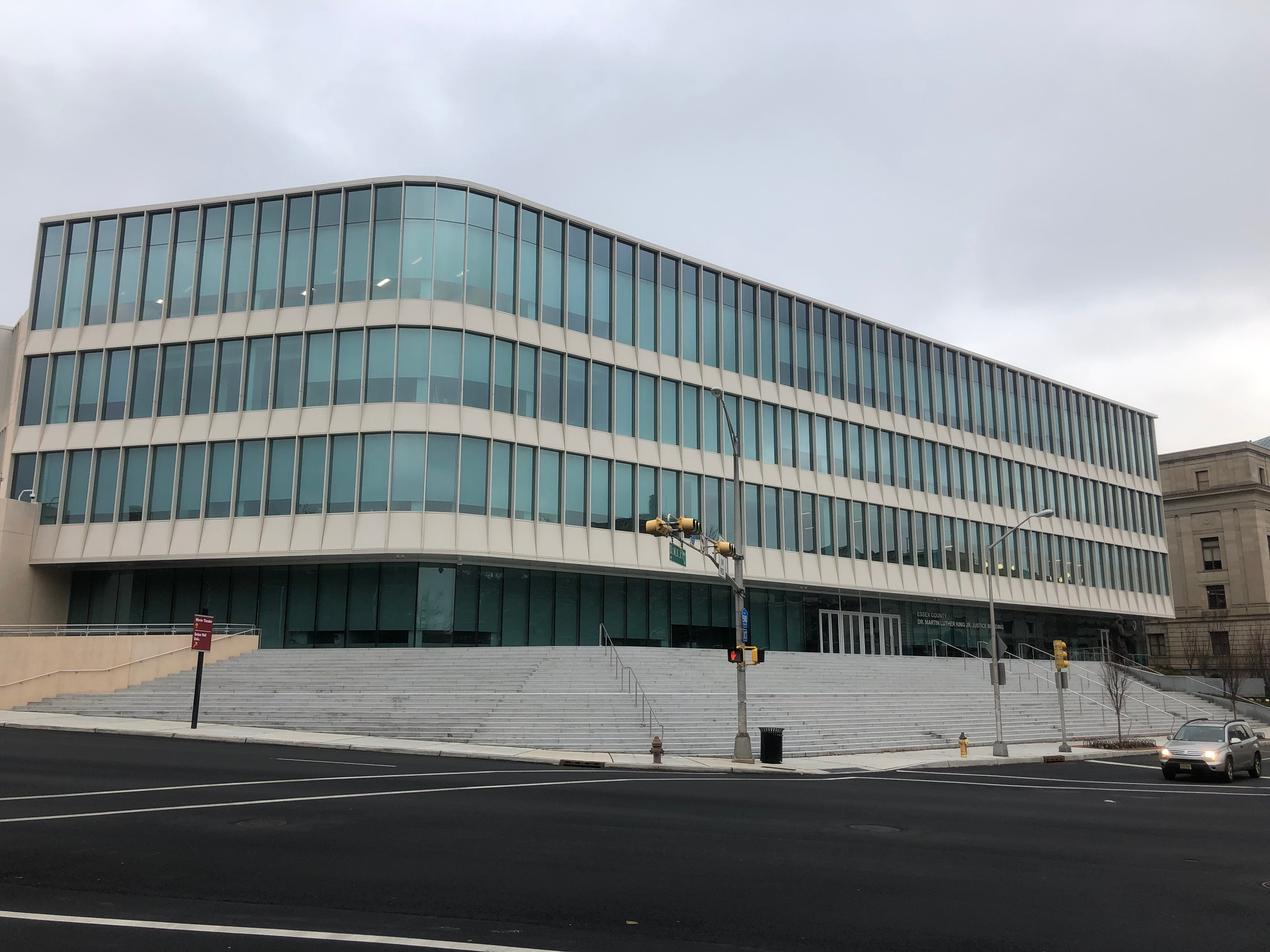
MLK Jr. Justice Building

== Martin Luther King Jr. Justice Building ==
The Martin Luther King Jr. Justice Building at 490 Martin Luther King Jr. Boulevard was designed by Comito and Associates of Newark and built between 2018 – 2021. The four-story glass, steel and concrete structure is just south of the Hall of Records and joined to it with a glass "skywalk". The building has 11 courtrooms. The County Clerk is headquarter in the building. Two statues of Martin Luther King Jr. are located on the grounds. Busts of human rights advocates Congressman John Lewis, Supreme Court Justice Ruth Bader Ginsburg and Congressman Peter Rodino are found in the lobby. Busts of Supreme Court Justices Sonia Sotomayor and Thurgood Marshall civil rights activist Rabbi Joachim Prinz, and Lieutenant Governor of New Jersey Sheila Oliver are planned.

== Veterans Memorial Park ==
Veterans Memorial Park is city square and part of Essex County Park System between the government buildings and a residential neighborhood in University Heights. It was created on the greyfieldsite of a demolished county parking deck. The 2.7 acres (1.1 ha) park, home to the Essex County Veterans Memorial, opened in September 2009.

== Wilentz Justice Complex ==
The Wilentz Justice Complex was established in 1997 at the Gibraltor Building between Washington Street and Halsey Street. It is named for Robert Nathan Wilentz (1927 – 1996), who was Chief Justice of the New Jersey Supreme Court from 1979 to 1996. It houses the Superior Court of New Jersey's 18 courtrooms, detention facilities, judges chambers, jury rooms, conference rooms, offices for administration staff, offices for the family division, special civil part, the child support unit and a host of ancillary support facilities. The courts and offices will be relocated to a family courthouse building upon its completion projected for 2025.

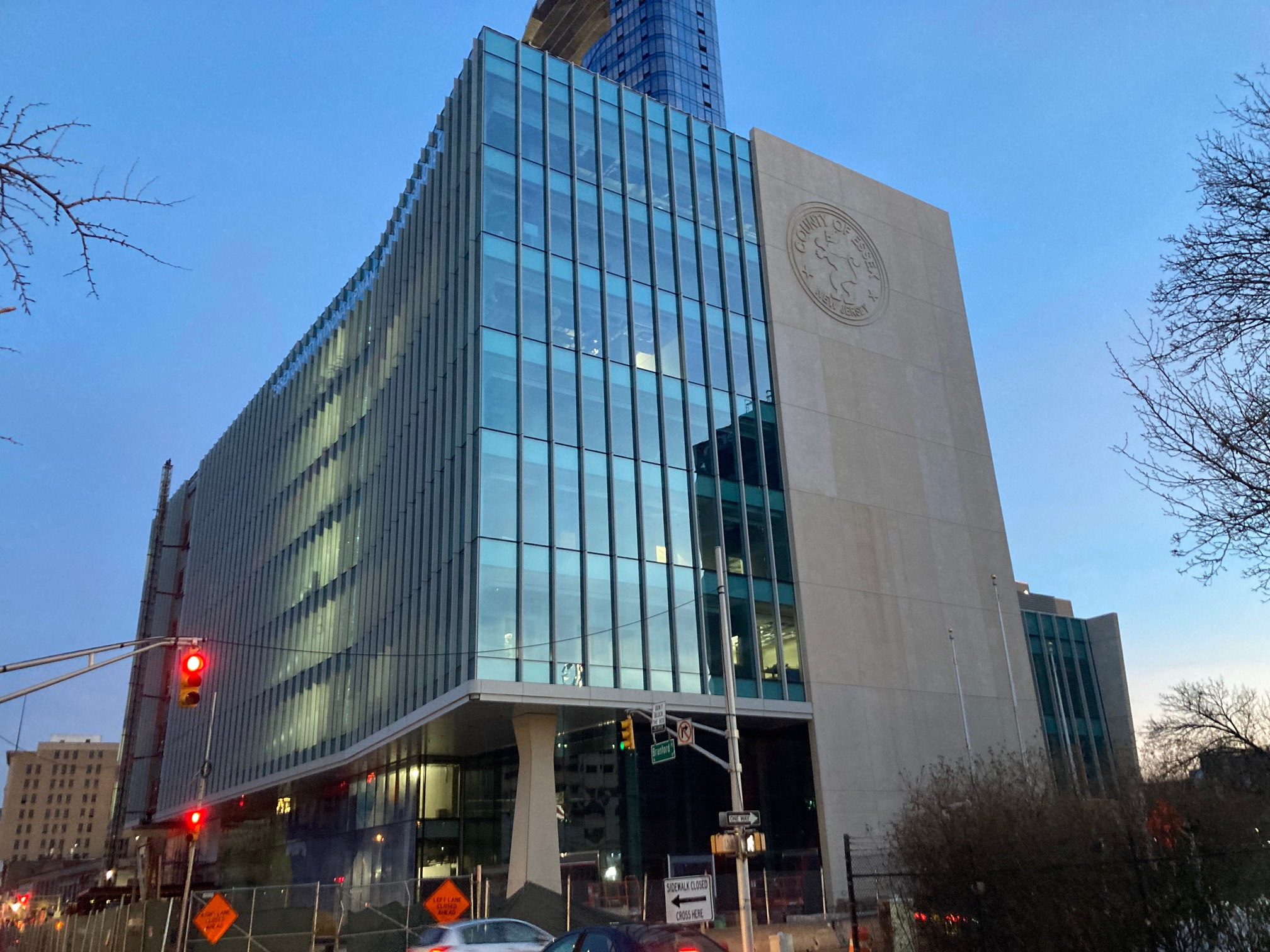
Essex County Family Court (2025)

== Essex County Wynona Lipman Courthouse ==
Construction began on the Essex County Family Courthouse in March 2023 and opened in July 2025. The 267,000-square-foot (24,800 m^{2}) building is located at Branford Place between Washington Street and University Avenue. There are 22 courtrooms, 19 for Family Court and three children-in-court courtrooms. It is to be dedicated to Wynona Lipman, the first African American woman elected to the New Jersey Senate.

== Essex County Division of Family Assistance and Benefits ==
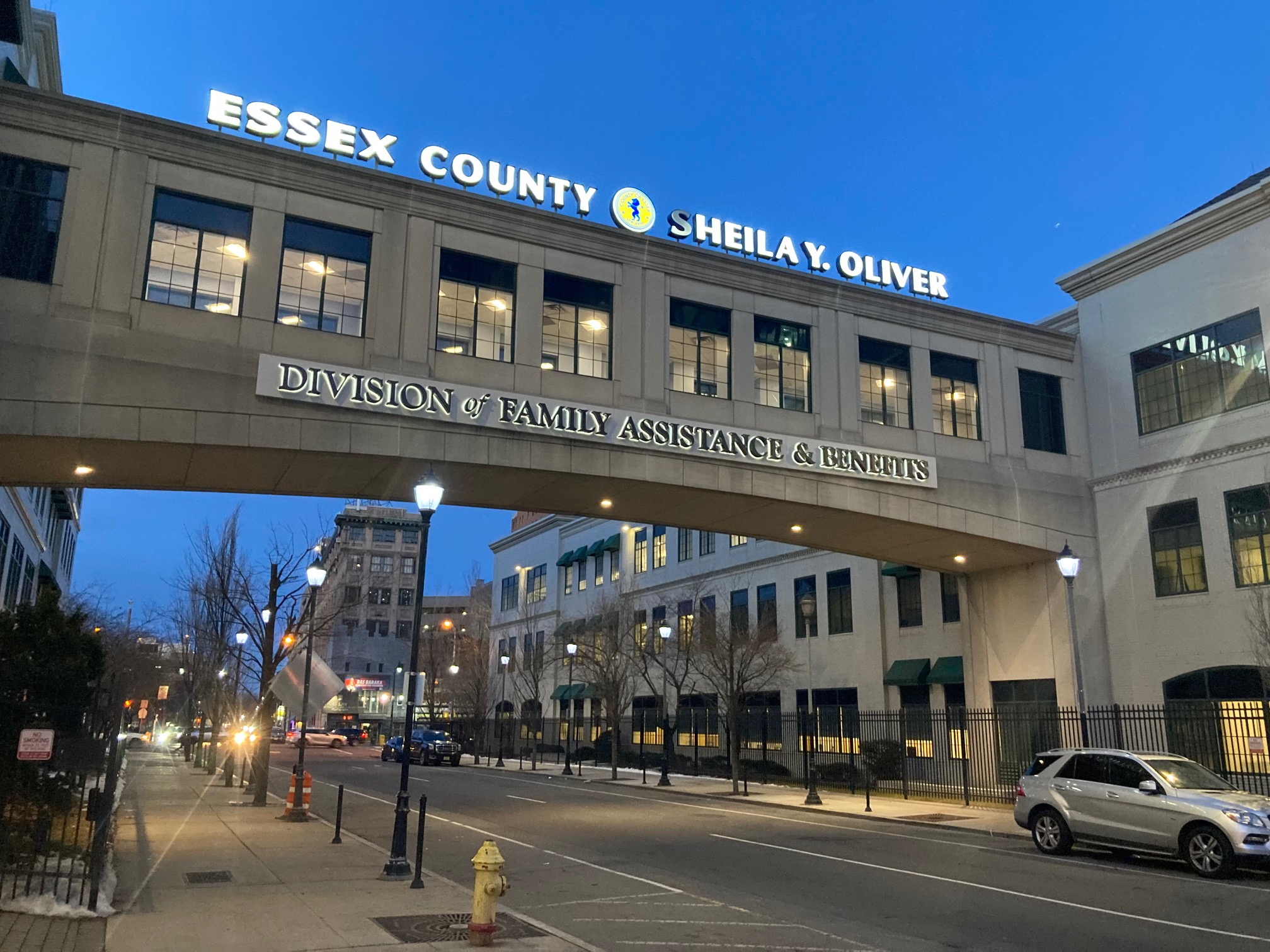
Walkway over University Avenue connecting building's two wings

The county purchased the building across from the historic courthouse at 320-321 University Avenue in 2019. relocating the office from Rector Street. The building was renamed when dedicated to Sheila Oliver (1952 – 2023), the second lieutenant governor of New Jersey from 2018 to 2023.

== Legends Way and public art ==
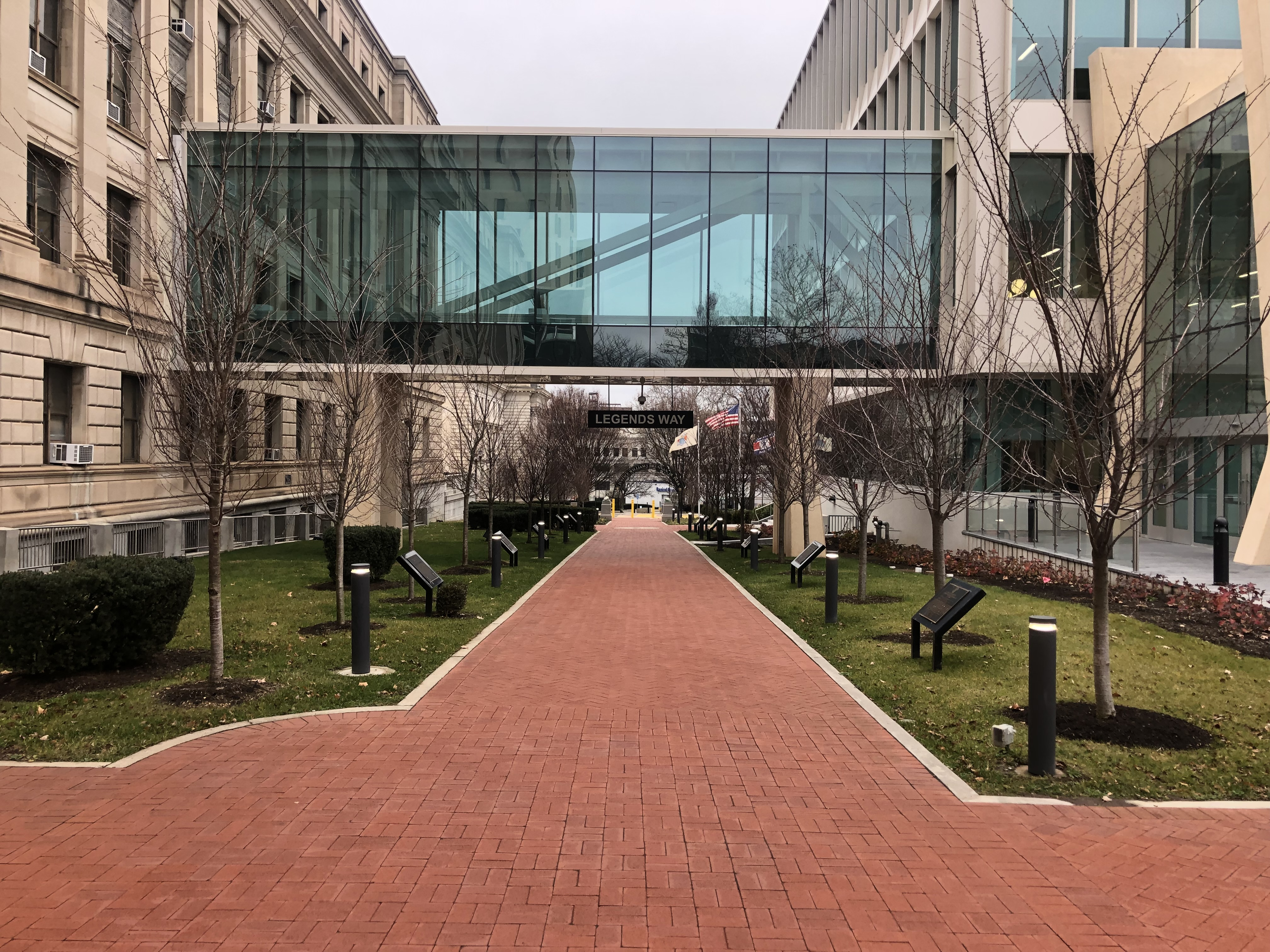
Legends Way replace 13th Street

Legends Way is an outdoor promenade between the Hall of Records and the MLK Jr. Building created in 2008 along the former 13th Avenue. Commemorative plaques pay homage to civil leaders and public figures who have made significant contributions to Essex County.

Interspersed between the buildings, plazas, and parks are statues and memorials, among them:

- Seated Lincoln
- Prudential Lions
- Statue of Martin Luther King Jr. (Newark)
- Rosa Parks Memorial

== See also ==
- County courthouses in New Jersey
- Richard J. Hughes Justice Complex
- Federal courthouses in New Jersey
- National Register of Historic Places listings in Essex County, New Jersey
