= Prudential Lions =

Public sculpture

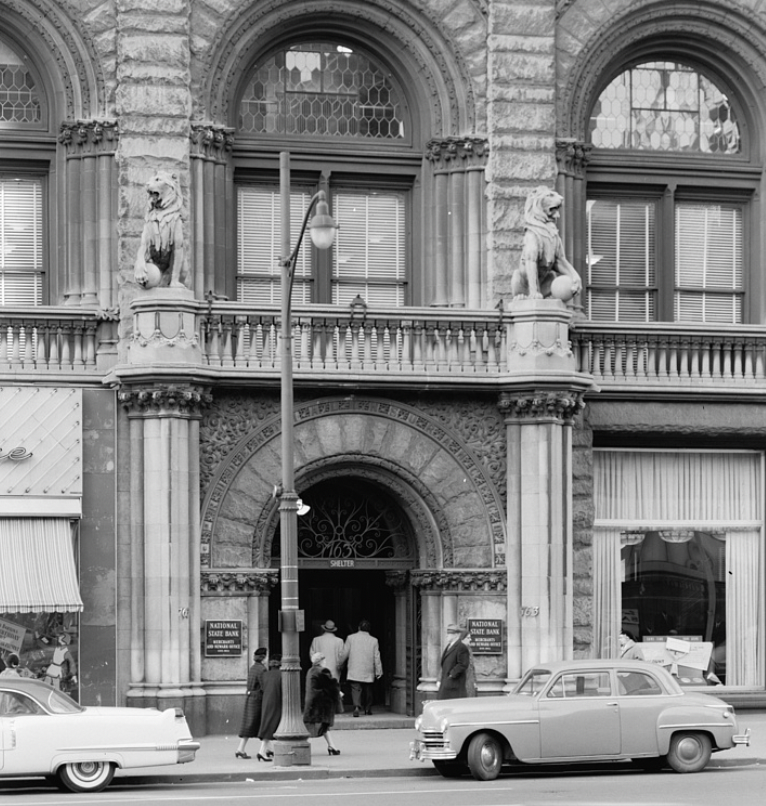
- Prudential Lions in situ (1956)
- Artist: Karl Bitter
- Completion date: 1901
- Dimensions: 7 feet (2.1 m) cm
- Location: Newark, New Jersey, US; 40.737518°N 74.179637°W
- Owner: City of Newark

The Prudential Lions are sculptures in Newark, New Jersey designed by Karl Bitter. The two carved limestone companion pieces depict seated male lions, each with its front paw placed on a sphere. They are approximately 7 feet (2.1 m) tall and weigh 2,900 pounds (1,300 kg) each. They been placed in three different locations.

The works were originally created in 1901 and stood above the front entrance of the Prudential Headquarters until the Prudential Home Office was demolished in 1956 and they were removed. They were given to Essex County Parks Commission by the Prudential Insurance Company of America and installed in Branch Brook Park in 1959.

In 2011, the Branch Brook Park Alliance commissioned the restoration the original statues and the creation of precast concrete replicas. The original sculptures were placed at the Essex County Hall of Records at the Essex County Government Complex, while the replicas were placed in the park where the originals had been located.

== See also ==
- List of public art in Newark, New Jersey
