= Justice (sculpture) =

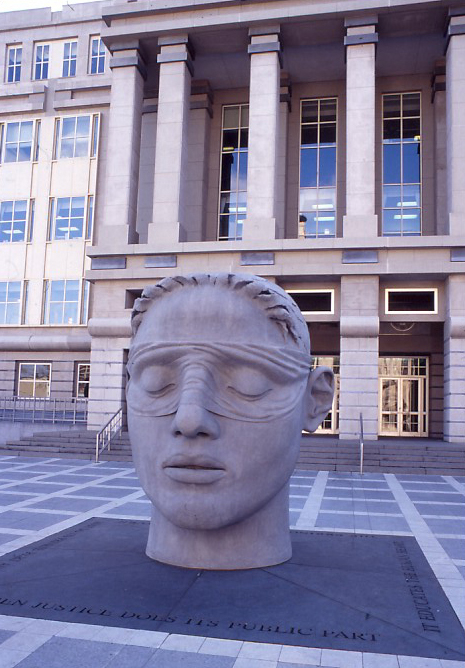
- Artist: Diana K. Moore
- Year: 1994
- Type: Sculpture
- Medium: Cast concrete
- Dimensions: 3.4 m × 2.7 m × 2.7 m (11 ft × 8.8 ft × 9 ft)
- Location: Newark, New Jersey, U.S.; 40°43′47.57″N 74°10′20.94″W

Justice is a 1994 sculpture by Diana K. Moore. The large blindfolded head of the Greek titaness Themis is currently located in the courtyard in front of the Martin Luther King, Jr. Federal Courthouse at the Government Center in Newark, New Jersey. The artwork was commissioned through the General Services Administration's Art in Architecture program in 1991. Justice is 11 ft (3.4 m) tall, 8.8 ft (2.7 m) wide, 9 ft (2.7 m) long, and made of cast concrete.

Moore drew inspiration from the traditions of "Khmer pieces from Cambodia, Etruscan, early Greek, and Egyptian figures", the colossal head of Constantine the Great, African masks, Olmec statues, and Eastern motifs such as the figure of Buddha.

A poem written by Mark Strand, the 1991 Poet Laureate of the United States is carved around the sculpture's base.

== See also ==
- List of public art in Newark, New Jersey
- Lady Justice
