= Grigory Gurevich =

Russian-American painter

- Born: 1937 (age 88–89); Leningrad (Saint Petersburg), Russia
- Known for: Painting, sculpture, graphic arts, photography, illustrator, bookmaking, pantomime
- Notable work: The Commuters, Reflections, 1-10; 10-1

Grigory Gurevich is a painter, sculptor, graphic artist, photographer, illustrator, bookmaker, mime and inventor. Originally from Leningrad (Saint Petersburg), Russia, he now resides in Jersey City, New Jersey.

== Early life ==
The son of an architect, Grigory Gurevich was born in 1938 December 26 in Leningrad (Saint Petersburg), Russia. At the beginning of World War II, he and a small group of children were evacuated to Kashtak, Siberia, and while parents weren't allowed to go, his mother jumped on the train. Following the war, the family reunited in Saint Petersburg to find their apartment occupied, forcing them to stay with his aunt, living in her dining room. His father created the design for Dubna, a "city of science" near Moscow, but instead of receiving the financial grant (the Lenin Premium), he was given the medal for the defense of Leningrad, and was later fired by the Leningrad GSP-11 Institute for being a Jew and never having been a member of Communist Party, leading to financial difficulties for the family and the divorce of Gurevich's parents.

As an artist, Gurevich's work was first exhibited in the United Exhibit of Artists in Moscow when he was fifteen, and he went on to study art, receiving a master's degree in art in 1961 from the Academy of Fine and Industrial Arts of Saint Petersburg. With a portion of his study devoted to architecture, he designed interiors, classrooms and laboratories, including furniture, then participated as an interior designer in a project with Architect Voronihina for Pushkin Museum, as well as designing Moscow's Winter Stadium. His first solo exhibition was held in 1971 at the Architectural House in Leningrad.

== Mime ==
In 1961, Gurevich saw a performance by Marcel Marceau in Leningrad, which inspired him to spend the next eight years studying the art of mime, creating his own professional group in 1966, the first professional mime company in Russia. His company went on a six-month tour of Asia, where they met up and toured with Marceau. Gurevich went on to study under and establish a friendship with Marceau. On his return to Moscow, his company merged with the State Theatre of Satire, which was run by Arkady Raikin, who was famous enough for Gurevich to be able to perform freely without facing pressure from government censors.

== Emigration ==
After he split with Raikin three years later, he found that due to the philosophical nature of his performances, Gurevich faced increasing censorship from Soviet authorities, making it difficult to find performance space, and ultimately resulting in his emigration to the United States in 1976. Aided by the Hebrew Immigrant Aid Society (HIAS) and NYANA, groups that helped Jews emigrate, he first traveled to Vienna and then Italy, before arriving in the U.S. without knowing English and with just $90 in his pocket. He was placed at the Hotel St. George in Brooklyn Heights with other Russian immigrants, working jobs that included driving his car as a car service, antique restoration, jewelry design and carpentry. During this time he established Grigur's Pantomime Theatre as a non-profit organization in 1979, touring throughout the world. After relocating to Jersey City, the theater was awarded a $5,000 grant in 1981 from the New Jersey Council of the Arts in order to expand its facilities. At the theatre, he also taught classes in pantomime. In 1984, he became a citizen of the United States.

== Art career ==
Although Gurevich continued to perform and teach pantomime, he dissolved his company in order to focus on art and teaching, ultimately conducting over three hundred exhibitions in the United States and Europe, as well as over two hundred sculpture workshops. He studied graphic and mechanical design at Parson's School of Design, and became a faculty member of Newark School of Fine and Industrial Arts, where he taught sculpture, drawing and jewelry until school was closed by Board of Education by City of Newark in 1996, and also Douglas College in New Brunswick. He also served as a professor at St. John's University in New York and a faculty member at the Newark School of Fine and Industrial Arts. His media varies, including works in pen and ink, drawings, jewelry, ceramics and watercolors.

=== The Commuters ===
He is well known for his sculpture, with his most famous work being The Commuters. Sculpted in 1985, The Commuters is the result of a commission. The series of seven statues, which depict commuters from 1935, are plaster casts from real life figures, created and donated in 1984 by a class from the Newark School of Fine and Industrial Art. Gurevich then had the life-sized figures, as well as a ticket booth, cast in bronze. The piece is now on permanent display in Newark's Penn Station.

=== Art books ===
In 1992, Gurevich turned his focus toward art books. His book Reflections is a series of 17 linocuts, etchings and mixed media prints. The book pairs Gurevich's artwork with the poetry of Florence Freedman, which are written in calligraphy by Gurevich's wife, Erika Wittmann-Gurevich. It's now part of the print collection of the New York Public Library, the rare book collection of the Newark Public Library, and the Hermitage Museum, in St. Petersburg, Russia. In 1995, he was awarded a patent for a manifolding book. His manifolding or kinetic books are in the collection of artist's books at Columbia University, with one – 1-10; 10-1 – in the library of the Brooklyn Museum.

=== Arts on the Hudson ===
In 1998, Gurevich founded an after-school art program called Arts on the Hudson. He had discovered that his son's school didn't have an art program, so he decided to found one himself, teaching art classes to anyone five years and older, starting with a $1,000 grant he received from the Hudson County Community Affairs, followed by additional funding from the Geraldine R. Dodge Foundation, which came to about $70,000. The programs included drawing, painting, music, African dance, stained glass, sculpture, martial arts, pantomime and web design. During this time, he was also conducting a regular series of sculpture workshops throughout New Jersey and New York, and for three years he led acrylic painting workshops at Union Hill High School, with the result being eleven murals in the Main Hall of the school.

== TV appearance ==
Gurevich played Sergei Perlman in "Disappearing Acts", a 1999 episode of the TV series Law & Order: Special Victims Unit.

== See also ==
- Museum of Russian Art
