= Essex County Courthouse =

- U.S. National Register of Historic Places
- New Jersey Register of Historic Places
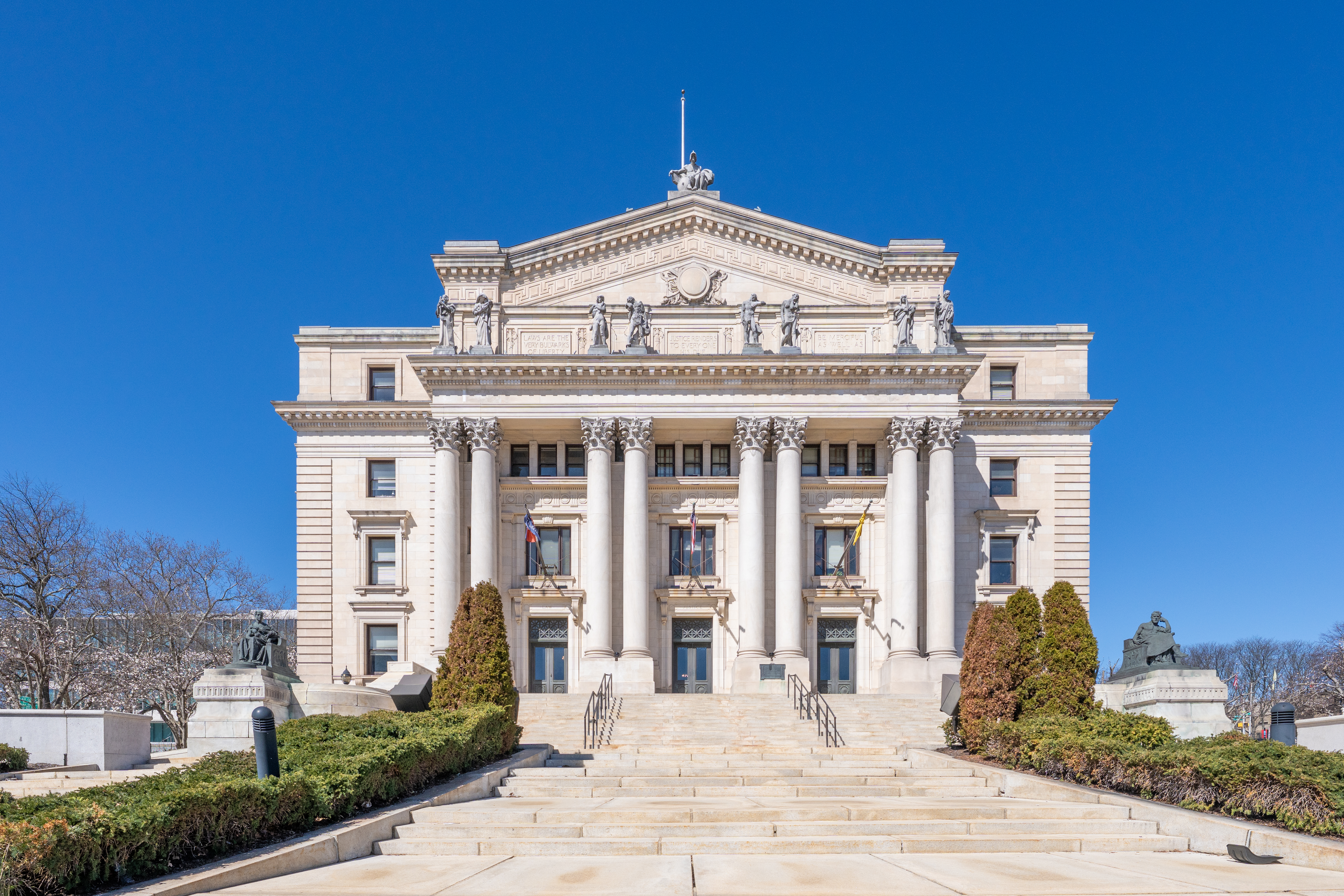

- Location within Essex County, New Jersey Location within New Jersey Location within the United States
- Interactive map showing the location for Essex County Courthouse
- Location: 50 West Market Street, Newark, New Jersey, U.S.
- Coordinates: 40.737201°N 74.178822°W
- Area: 1.2 acres (0.49 ha)
- Built: 1904
- Architect: Cass Gilbert
- Architectural style: Renaissance
- NRHP reference No.: 75001135
- NJRHP No.: 1246

Significant dates
- Added to NRHP: June 26, 1975
- Designated NJRHP: March 26, 1975

The Essex County Courthouse is located at the Essex County Government Complex in Newark, New Jersey, United States. It was built in 1904 and was added to the National Register of Historic Places on June 26, 1975, for its significance in art and architecture.

The building, designed by Cass Gilbert, has a four-story rotunda topped with a Tiffany skylight. It features artwork from some of the most well known artists of the American Renaissance period including Seated Lincoln by Gutzon Borglum.

The main facade is adorned with nine sculptures by Piccirilli Brothers.

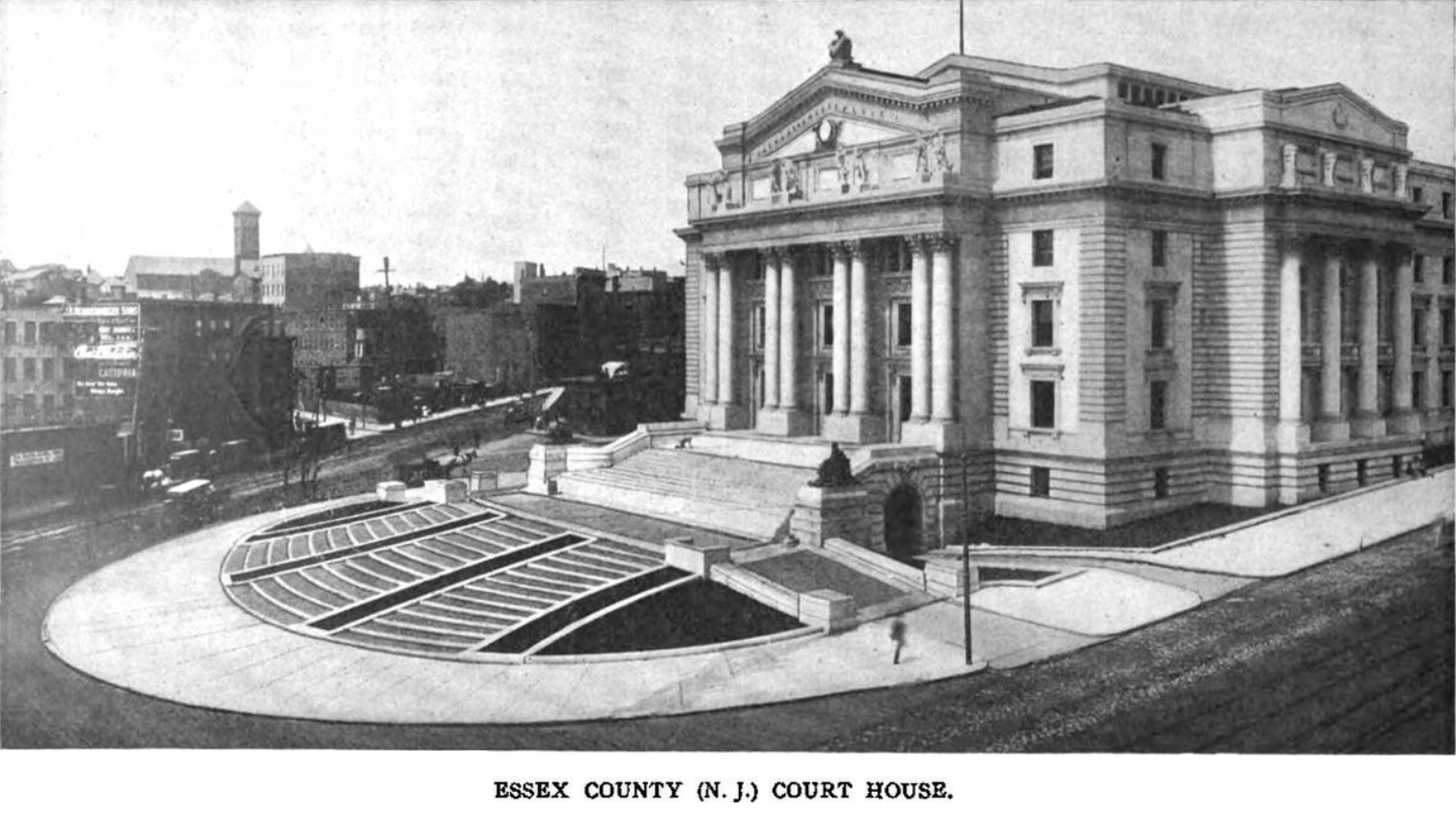
The courthouse as it appeared in 1907

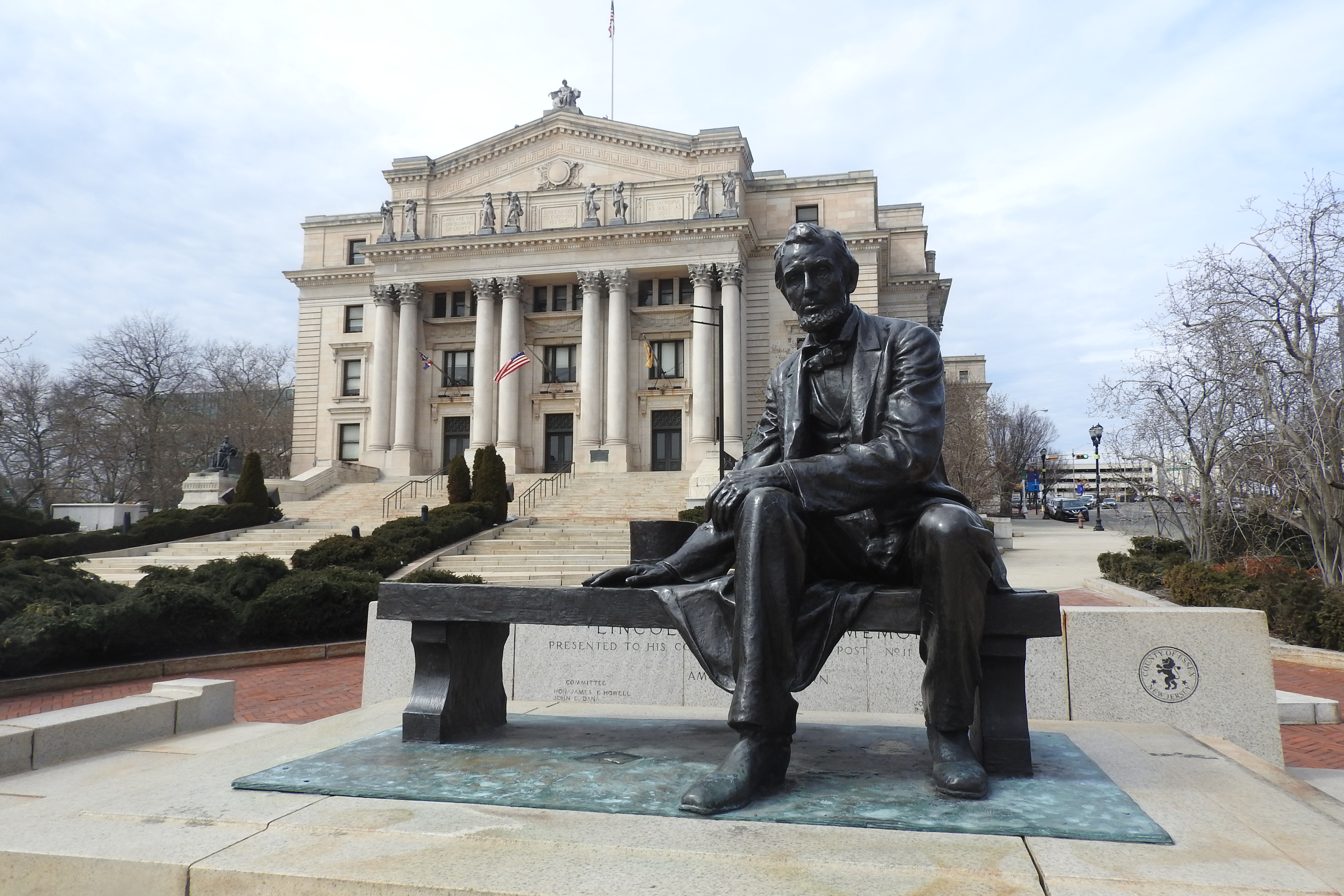
Seated Lincoln

== See also ==
- County courthouses in New Jersey
- Richard J. Hughes Justice Complex
- Federal courthouses in New Jersey
- National Register of Historic Places listings in Essex County, New Jersey
- Seated Lincoln
- Statue of Martin Luther King Jr. (Newark)
