= Behold (statue) =

Public sculpture in Georgia

- Interactive map of Behold
- Location: Martin Luther King Jr. National Historical Park, Atlanta, Georgia, United States
- Coordinates: 33°45′20″N 84°22′26″W
- Designer: Patrick Morelli

Behold is a statue designed by sculptor Patrick Morelli. Dedicated in 1990 by Coretta Scott King, the statue is located in front of Ebenezer Baptist Church, in the Martin Luther King Jr. National Historical Park.

== History ==
The statue was dedicated on January 11, 1990, by Coretta Scott King, the widowed wife of Martin Luther King Jr. The statue was an unsolicited gift to The King Center, and initially the center had concerns over the work's artistic merit. The piece is located in a small park near Ebenezer Baptist Church. The statue is based on an African ritual of lifting a newborn to the skies. It depicts an allegorical figure of Kunta Kinte lifting his newborn towards the sky. The statue is a popular spot for photographers. The statue itself is made of bronze, with a granite pedestal inscribed with the phrase:

Dedicated to the memory of Dr. Martin Luther King, Jr. for his moral courage and nobility of spirit

== Second casting ==
A second casting of Behold is located at Essex County College in Newark, New Jersey. The piece was commissioned by the New Jersey Martin Luther King, Jr. Commemorative Commission, a government agency within the New Jersey Department of State). It was dedicated in a ceremony led by Mayor Sharpe James in 1990.

== See also ==
- 1990 in art
