= Seated Lincoln (Borglum) =

- U.S. National Register of Historic Places
- New Jersey Register of Historic Places
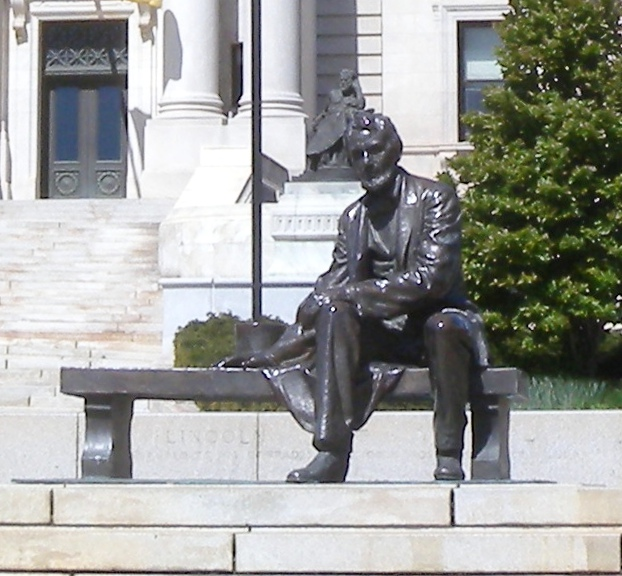
- Seated Lincoln, a sculpture of Abraham Lincoln in Newark, New Jersey

- Location within Essex County, New Jersey Location within New Jersey Location within the United States
- Location: Jct. of Springfield Ave. and Market St., Essex County Courthouse Plaza, Newark, New Jersey, U.S.
- Coordinates: 40°44′13″N 74°10′40″W
- Area: less than one acre
- Built: 1911
- Architect: Gutzon Borglum
- Architectural style: Monument/Sculpture
- MPS: Public Sculpture in Newark MPS
- NRHP reference No.: 95000303
- NJRHP No.: 2805

Significant dates
- Added to NRHP: March 30, 1995
- Designated NJRHP: February 15, 1995

Seated Lincoln is a 1911 sculpture by Gutzon Borglum, located next to the Essex County Courthouse in Newark, Essex County, New Jersey. It was added to the National Register of Historic Places on March 30, 1995, for its significance in art.

== History and description ==
The bronze sculpture depicts Abraham Lincoln larger than life size, seated at one end of a bench also cast in bronze. Lincoln is bearded but bare headed, with his stovepipe hat resting on the bench beside the man's hand. The bronze is set on a low stone platform with five steps, beside the steps to the courthouse. The informal composition was an unusual departure from the usual monumental depiction of Lincoln standing or enthroned on a high plinth. It was inspired by Borglum's research, reading that Lincoln often sat alone on a bench in the White House garden to gather his thoughts during the American Civil War, particularly when there was bad news. In 1908, Borgulm had completed the marble bust of Lincoln which is now installed at the U.S. Capitol, and he later sculpted the heads of four U.S. presidents including Lincoln at Mount Rushmore.

The work was funded by a $25,000 bequest by Newark businessman Amos Hoagland Van Horn, who died in 1908. Van Horn's estate also funded Borglum's Wars of America monument, erected in Newark in 1926.

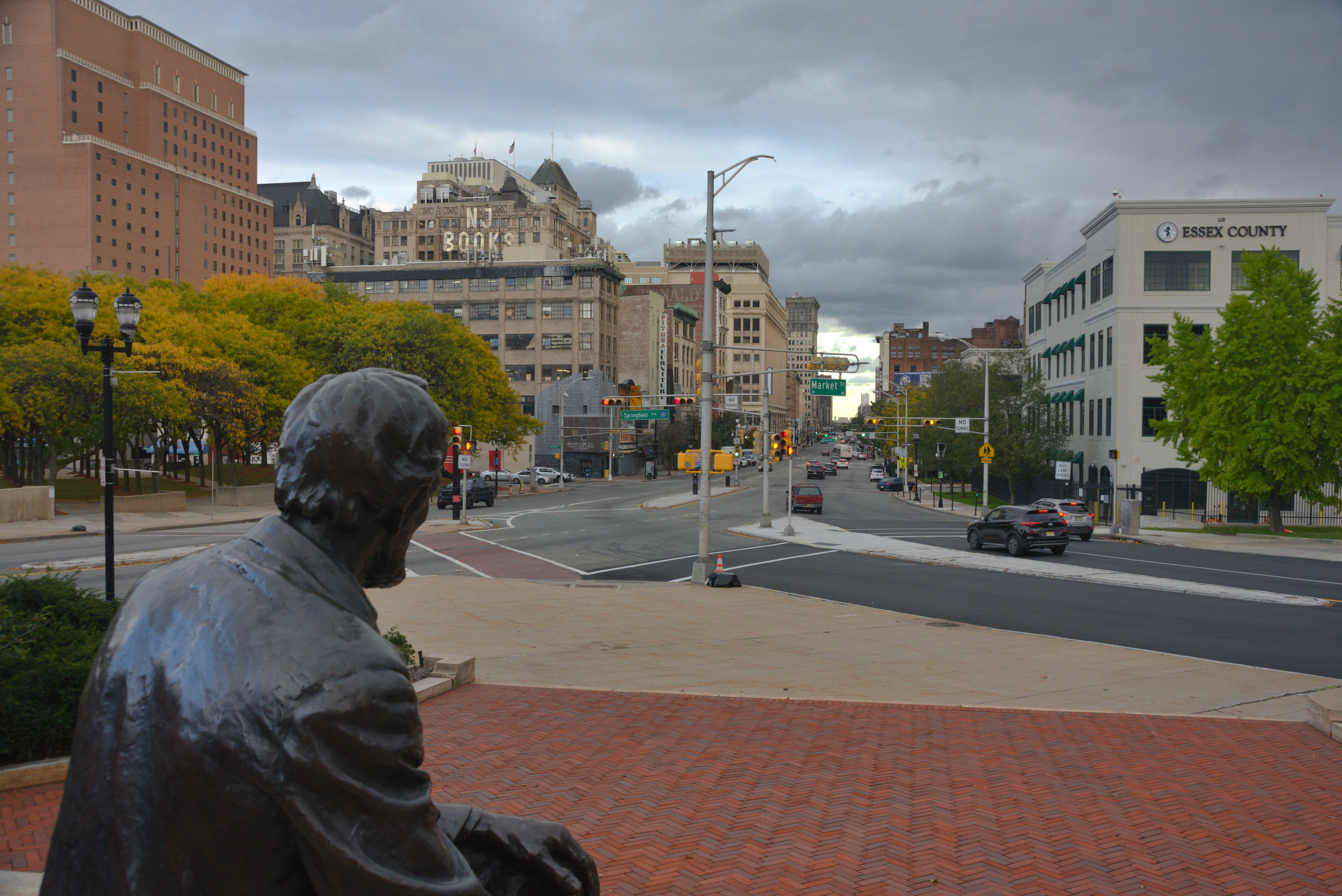
Lincoln overlooking Downtown Newark

The sculpture was cast at the Gorham Manufacturing Company foundry in New York, and dedicated by President Theodore Roosevelt on Memorial Day, May 30, 1911. Roosevelt reportedly exclaimed "Why this doesn't look like a monument at all!" which Borglum took as a compliment. The sculpture was restored in 1980 by the Cavalier Renaissance Foundry of Bridgeport, Connecticut.

Borglum also made a number of smaller bronze maquettes of the statue. One example, 22 in × 29 in × 15.75 in (55.9 cm × 73.7 cm × 40.0 cm), was sold at Sotheby's in 2009 for $62,500, and another in 2016 for $100,000.

== Lincoln and Newark ==
While Lincoln won the most electors in the 1860 United States presidential election in New Jersey, he won fewer votes across the state and in Essex County than the other three candidates combined. Historian Charles Cummings has attributed this opposition to Newark businesses' significant demand from southern plantations.

To quell Newark business owners' interest in seceding, New Jersey Governor Charles Smith Olden invited Lincoln to speak in Trenton while traveling to his first inauguration. The Newark Common Council subsequently invited Lincoln to visit Newark along his train ride between New York City and Trenton. Lincoln agreed and on February 21, 1861, his presidential train stopped in Newark for 45 minutes.

During this visit, Newark Mayor Moses Bigelow greeted Lincoln and gave a tour of the city's parks. Despite Lincoln never visiting the city again, the city has many memorials dedicated to Lincoln, such as this sculpture.

== See also ==
- Lincoln the Mystic
- Wars of America
- List of statues of Abraham Lincoln
- National Register of Historic Places listings in Essex County, New Jersey
- List of sculptures of presidents of the United States
