= Stanley J. Watts =

American sculptor (born 1961)

- Born: 1961 (age 64–65); Salt Lake City, Utah, U.S.
- Notable work: Lift a Nation

Stanley J. Watts (born 1961) is an American artist and sculptor, mostly in life size bronzes.

== Biography ==
Watts was born in Salt Lake City, Utah and grew up in the city's Sugar House neighborhood. While attending Salt Lake's South High School he was already a noted artist, being recognized as a Sterling Scholar in art; the Sterling Scholar designation being one of Utah's highest academic recognitions for High school students. Watts went on to attend Utah State University in Logan, Utah, but only to fail sculpture. After returning to Salt Lake City Watts was tutored by noted sculptor Avard Fairbanks. Watts has done many LDS Church-related works, including a large bronze piece depicting Joseph and Hyrum Smith on horseback; this statue is placed directly in front of the Nauvoo Illinois Temple.

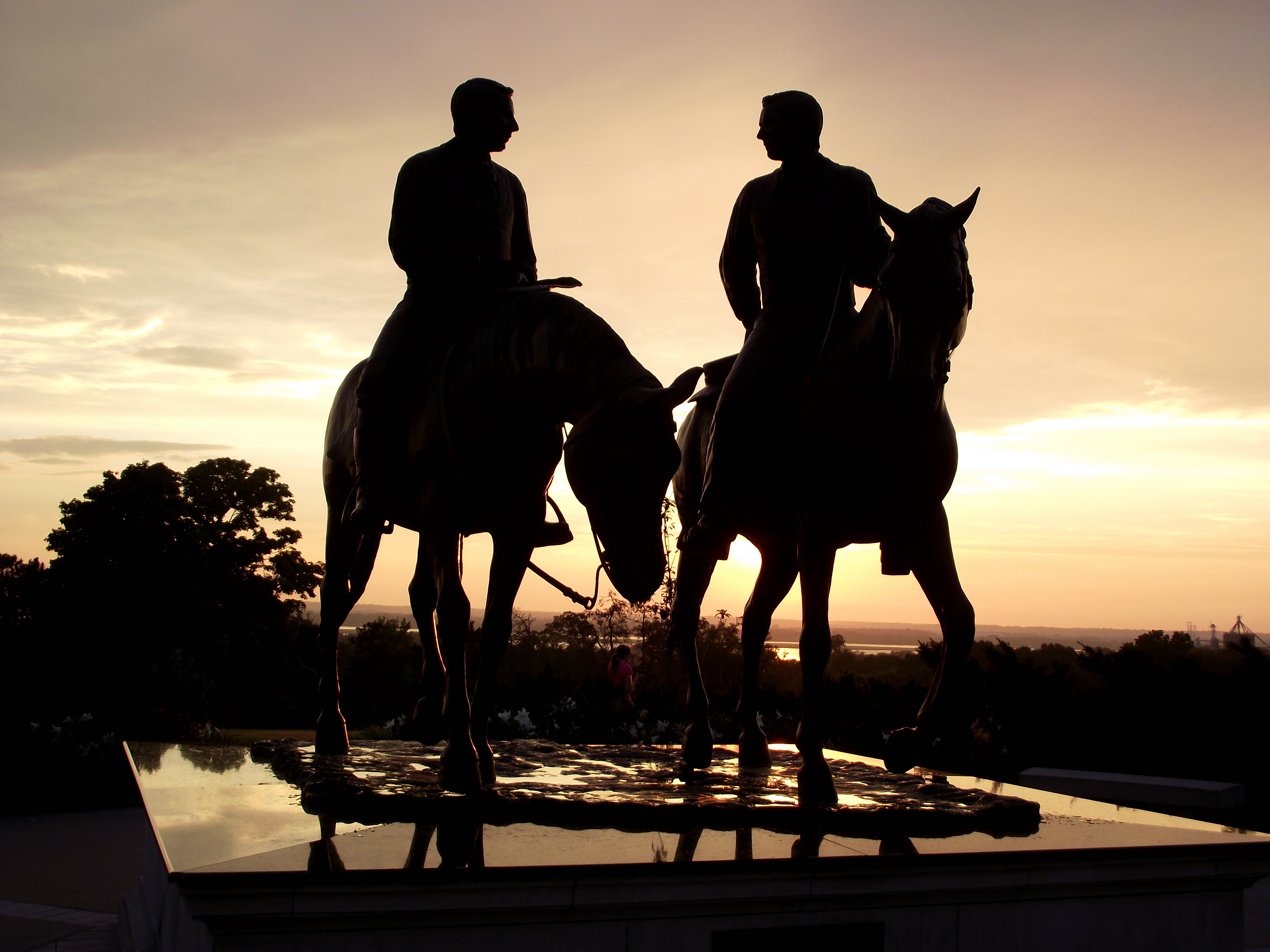

One of Watts' most famous pieces is entitled, "To Lift a Nation", and is taken from the famous photo of New York City firefighters raising a flag over the collapsed World Trade Center site.
