= Prudential Headquarters =

Company headquarters in Newark, New Jersey

Prudential Financial, formerly Prudential Insurance, is a large financial services company based in Newark, New Jersey, United States. The company has constructed a number of buildings to house its offices in downtown in the Four Corners district. In addition to its own offices, the corporation has financed large projects in the city, including Gateway Center and Prudential Center. Prudential has over 5,000 employees in the city.

== Prudential Home Office ==
Prudential Home Office
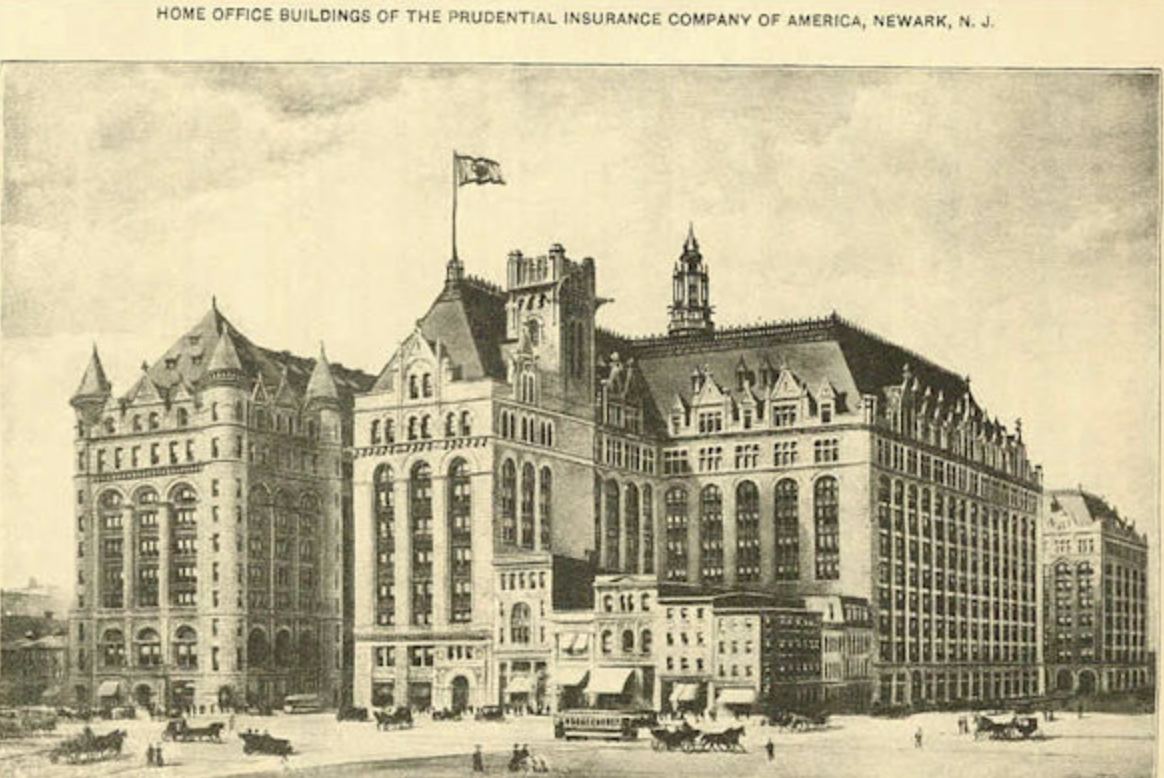

General information
- Completed: 1892
- Demolished: 1956

Height
- Roof: 45.73 m (150.0 ft)

Technical details
- Floor count: 11

Design and construction
- Architect: George B. Post
- Main contractor: Hedden Construction Company

The four original Prudential headquarters buildings were built from 1892 to 1911 as early examples of steel framing in Newark, clad in gray Indiana limestone with Romanesque styling, the work of George B. Post. The four buildings were known as the Main Building, the North Building, the West Building, and the Northwest Building, and were the tallest in the city at the turn of the 20th century. All were demolished in 1956 to make way for the current Prudential Plaza building.

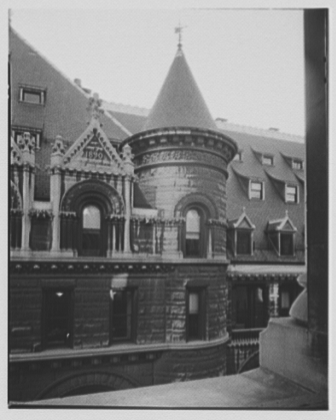
Detail of the tower of the Main Building

The Prudential Lions are sculptures designed by Karl Bitter. The two carved limestone companion pieces depict seated male lions, each with its front paw placed on a sphere. They are approximately 7 feet (2.1 m) tall and weigh 2,900 pounds (1,300 kg) each. The works were originally created 1901 to stand above the front entrance of the Prudential Home Office. When it was demolished in they were removed and given to Essex County Parks Commission by Prudential and installed in Branch Brook Park in 1959.

== Gibraltar Building ==
Gibraltar Building
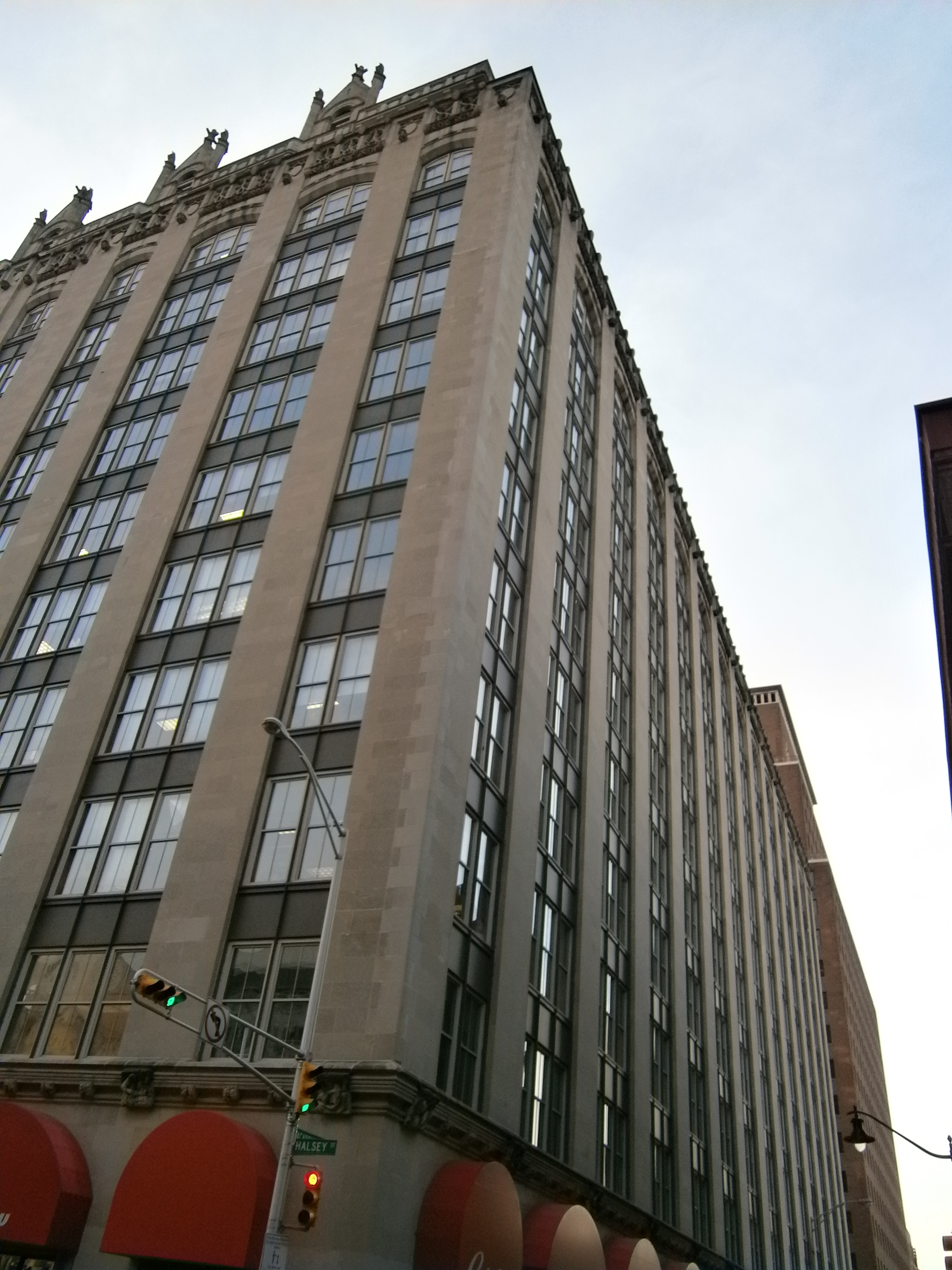

General information
- Location: 153 Halsey Street
- Coordinates: 40.7375175°N 74.1733776°W
- Completed: 1927

Height
- Roof: 67 m (220 ft)

Technical details
- Floor count: 14
- Floor area: 299,990 sq ft (27,870 m^{2})

Design and construction
- Architect: Cass Gilbert

The Gibraltar Building was built by Prudential in 1927 at 153 Halsey Street, across from the old Home Office as additional office space. The name was inspired by the Rock of Gibraltar, which is featured in the Prudential logo. The Gothic Revival structure was designed by the architect Cass Gilbert, renowned for many works including the Woolworth Building and the United States Supreme Court Building.

It was sold by Prudential in 1986 to Hartz Mountain Industries, which renovated the building. The Willentz Justice Complex is located inside the building. It is named for Robert Nathan Wilentz (1927–1996), who was Chief Justice of the New Jersey Supreme Court from 1979 to 1996. The New Jersey Motion Picture & Television Commission, as well as other government agencies and private enterprises are also located there.

It was sold in 2021 to an investment partnership, which planned a major renovation to upgrade and 'reactivate' it.

== Prudential Building ==
Prudential Building
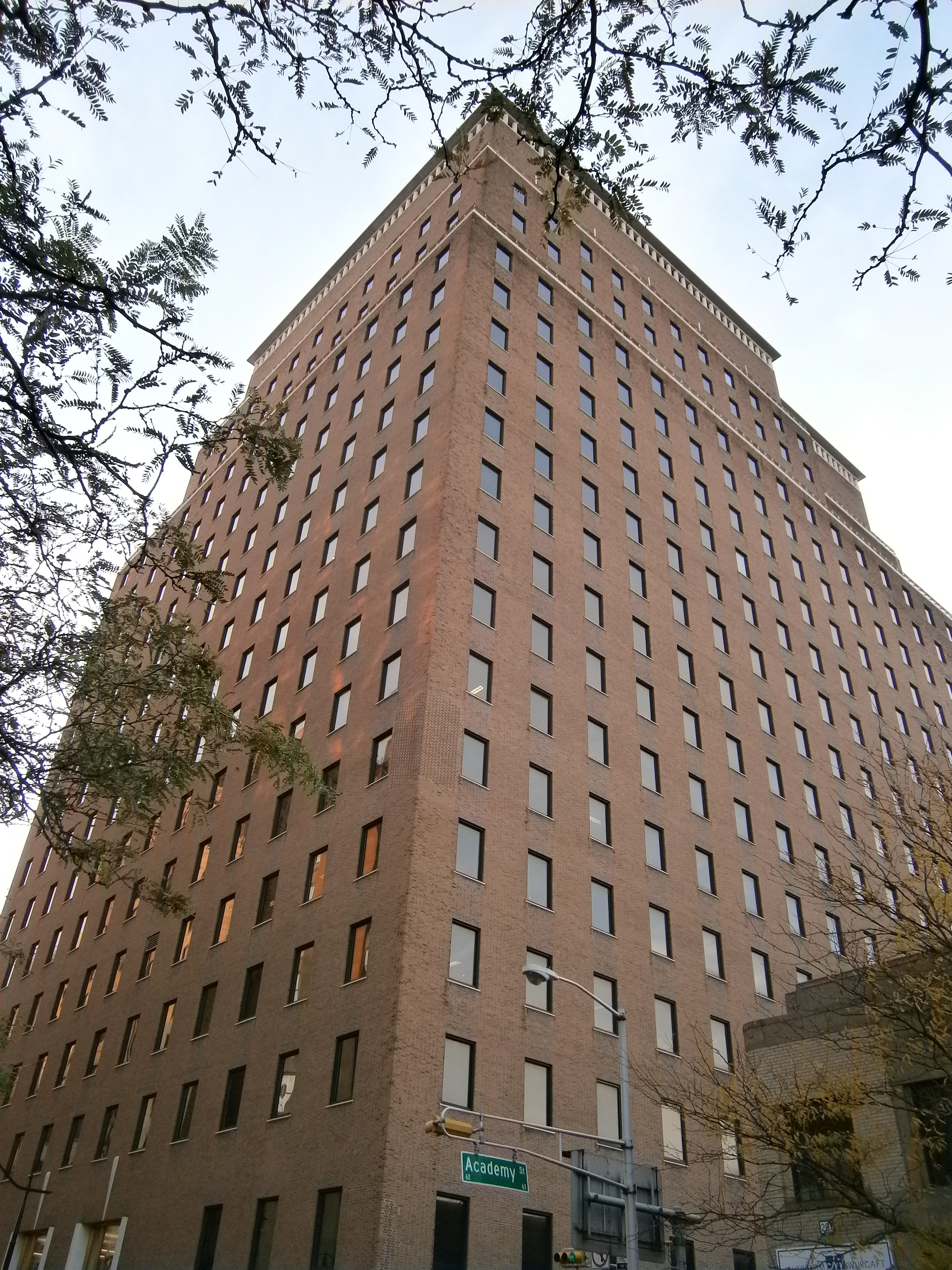

General information
- Location: 213 Washington Street
- Coordinates: 40.7378561°N 74.1744907°W
- Completed: 1942

Height
- Roof: 91 m (299 ft)

Technical details
- Floor count: 21

Design and construction
- Structural engineer: Gunvald Aus Company

The Prudential Building is located at 213 Washington Street, across from the Gibraltar Building. It was completed in 1942. Shortly after it was taken over by the federal government for use by the Office of Dependency Benefits (ODB), which was responsible for payments to military dependents and their families and moved to Newark from Washington during World War II. Work went on around the clock at 213 Washington Street until it was returned to Prudential in 1946.

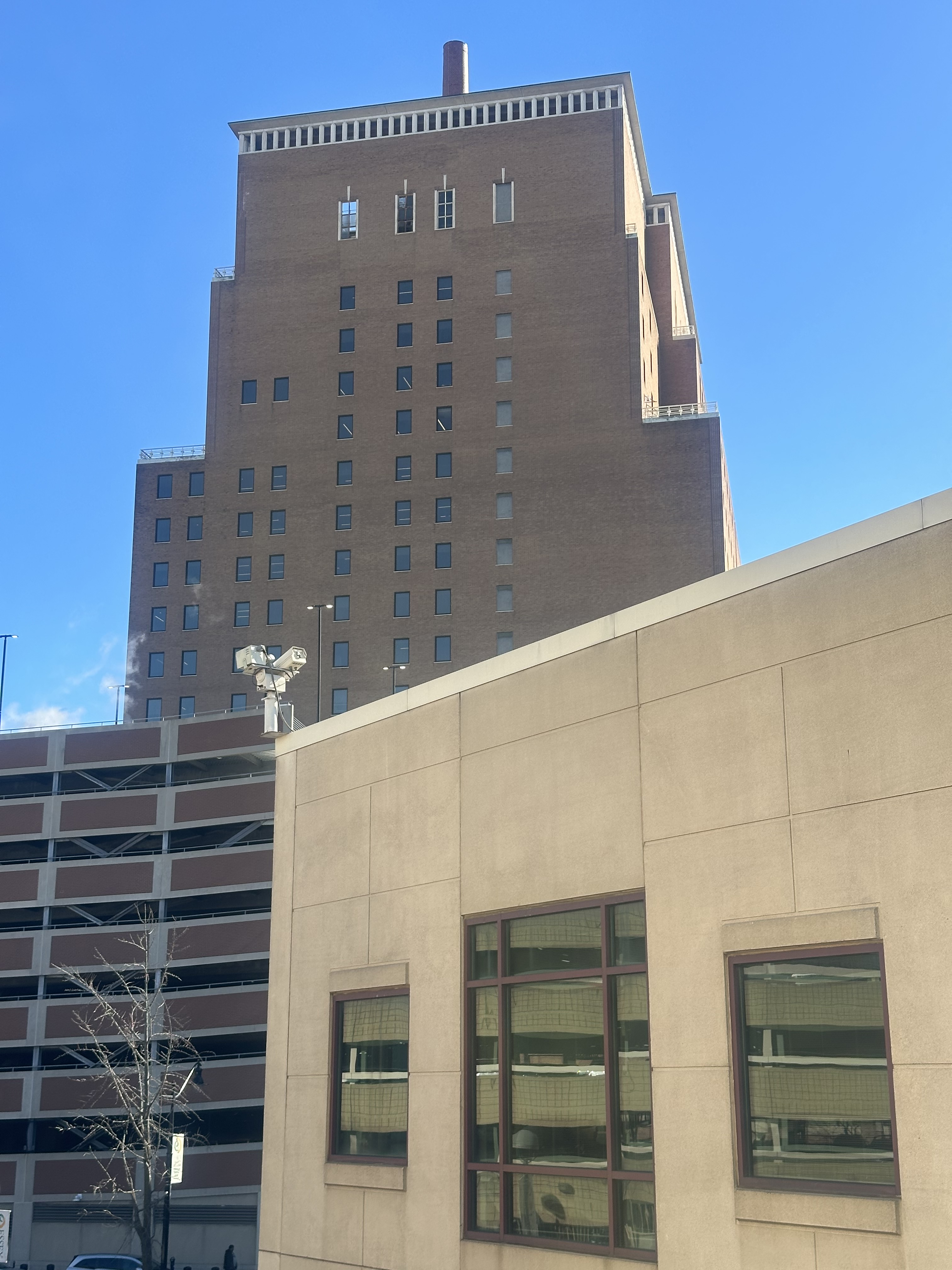
February 2024

== Prudential Plaza ==
Prudential Plaza
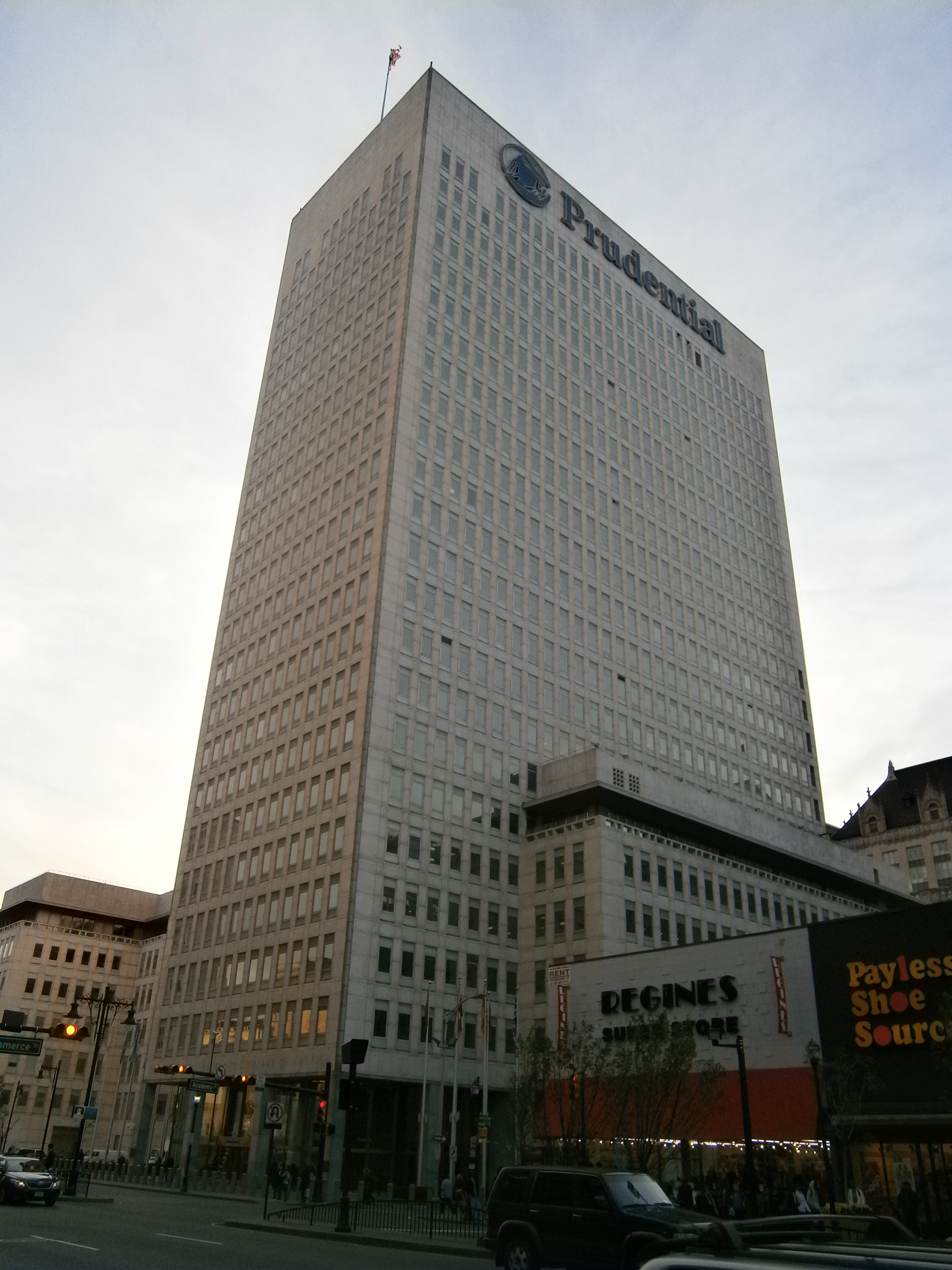

General information
- Location: 745 Broad Street
- Coordinates: 40.7370285°N 74.1717390°W
- Construction started: 1956
- Opening: 1960

Height
- Roof: 114 m (374 ft)

Technical details
- Floor count: 24

Design and construction
- Architect: Voorhees, Walker, Smith, Smith and Haines

Prudential's main headquarters, Prudential Plaza, opened in 1960 on the site of the former home office buildings during the New Newark era when modernist buildings were built downtown. The International style building is one of the tallest and most prominent on the Newark skyline. The facade of Vermont marble includes 1,600 windows set in aluminum frames. It was designed by Voorhees, Walker, Smith, Smith and Haines The lobby of the building was originally adorned with triptych of mosaics designed by Hildreth Meiere entitled "The Pillars of Hercules". The panels had been removed and put in storage; two were formally installed at the Center for Hellenic Studies in Washington, D.C., and another in Newark Museum.

On August 1, 2004, the U.S. Department of Homeland Security announced the discovery of terrorist threats against the Plaza prompting large-scale security measures such as concrete barriers and internal security changes such as X-ray machines.

== Prudential Tower ==
Prudential Tower
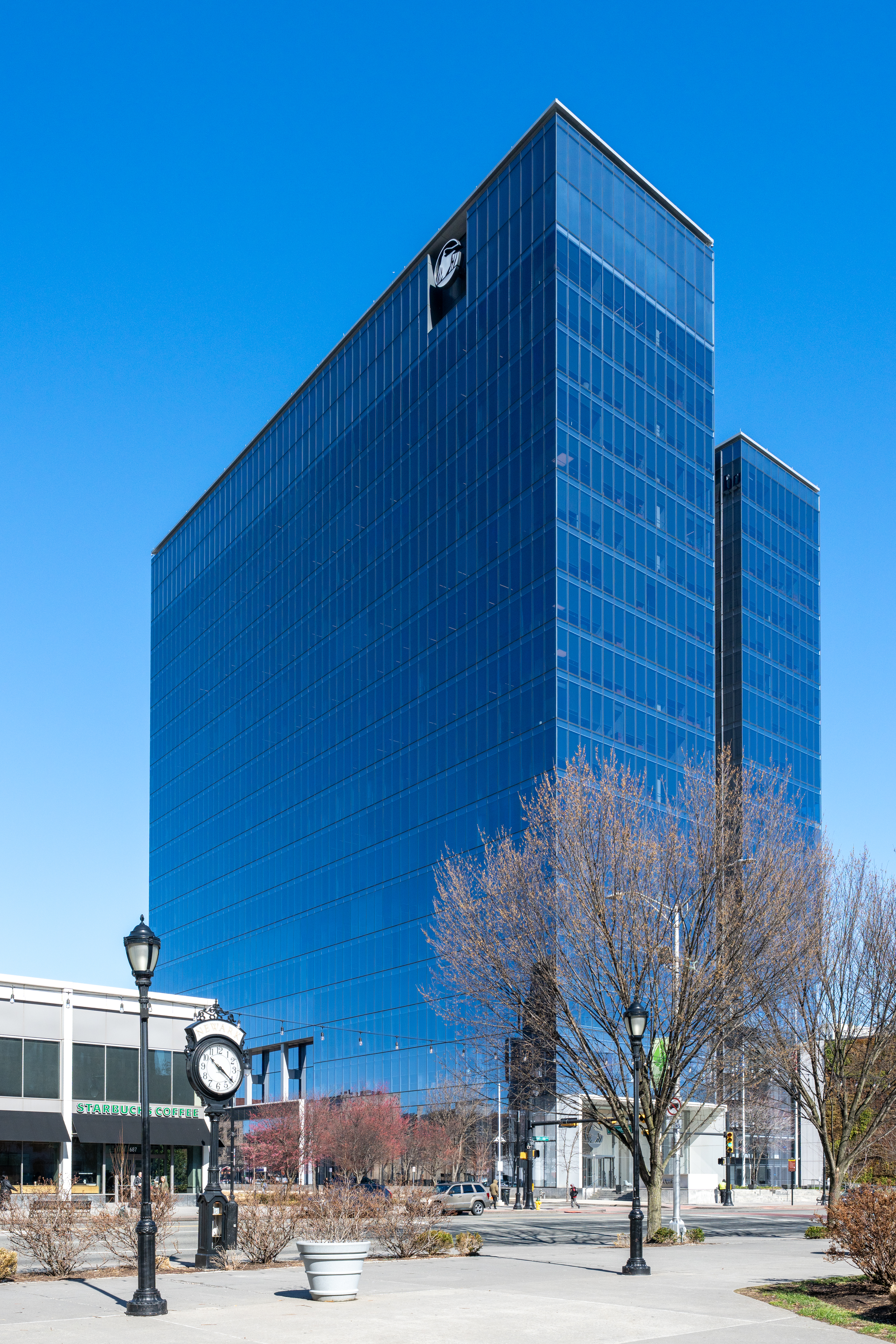

General information
- Status: Completed
- Location: 655 Broad Street
- Coordinates: 40.7392880°N 74.1711990°W
- Construction started: 2013
- Completed: 2015
- Opening: 2015

Height
- Roof: 45.73 m (150.0 ft)

Technical details
- Floor count: 20

Design and construction
- Architect: Kohn Pedersen Fox

In 2011, Prudential announced plans to construct another office tower near the Plaza headquarters. The company had received a $250 million urban transit tax credit from the state which required that it create new jobs and build within walking distance of a transit hub. The site of the $444 million 650,000 sq ft (60,000 m^{2}) tower is on Broad Street just west of Military Park. Construction began in July 2013. The exterior of the tower was completed in January 2015 and the building opened in July 2015.

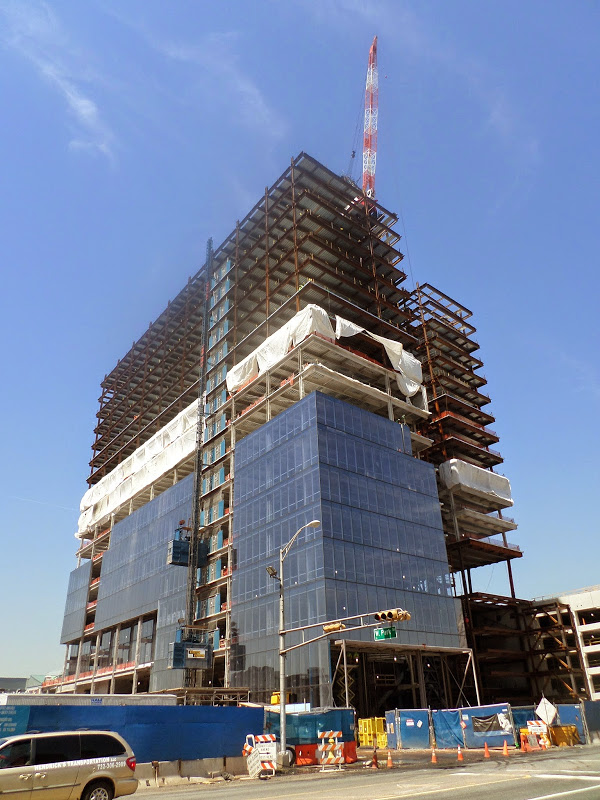
Construction April 2014

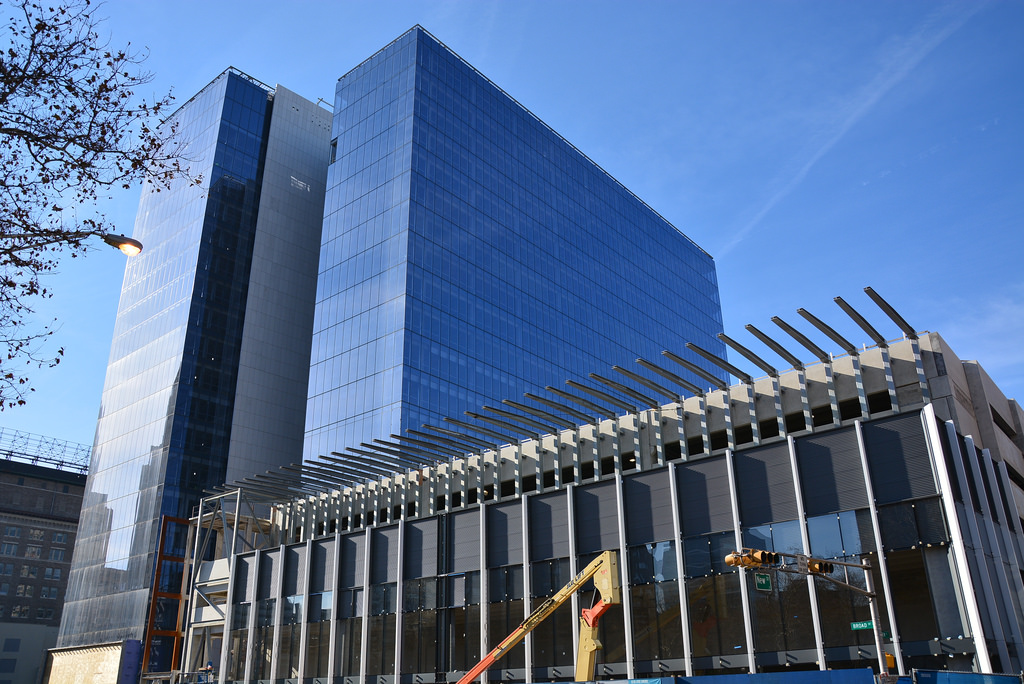
January 2015

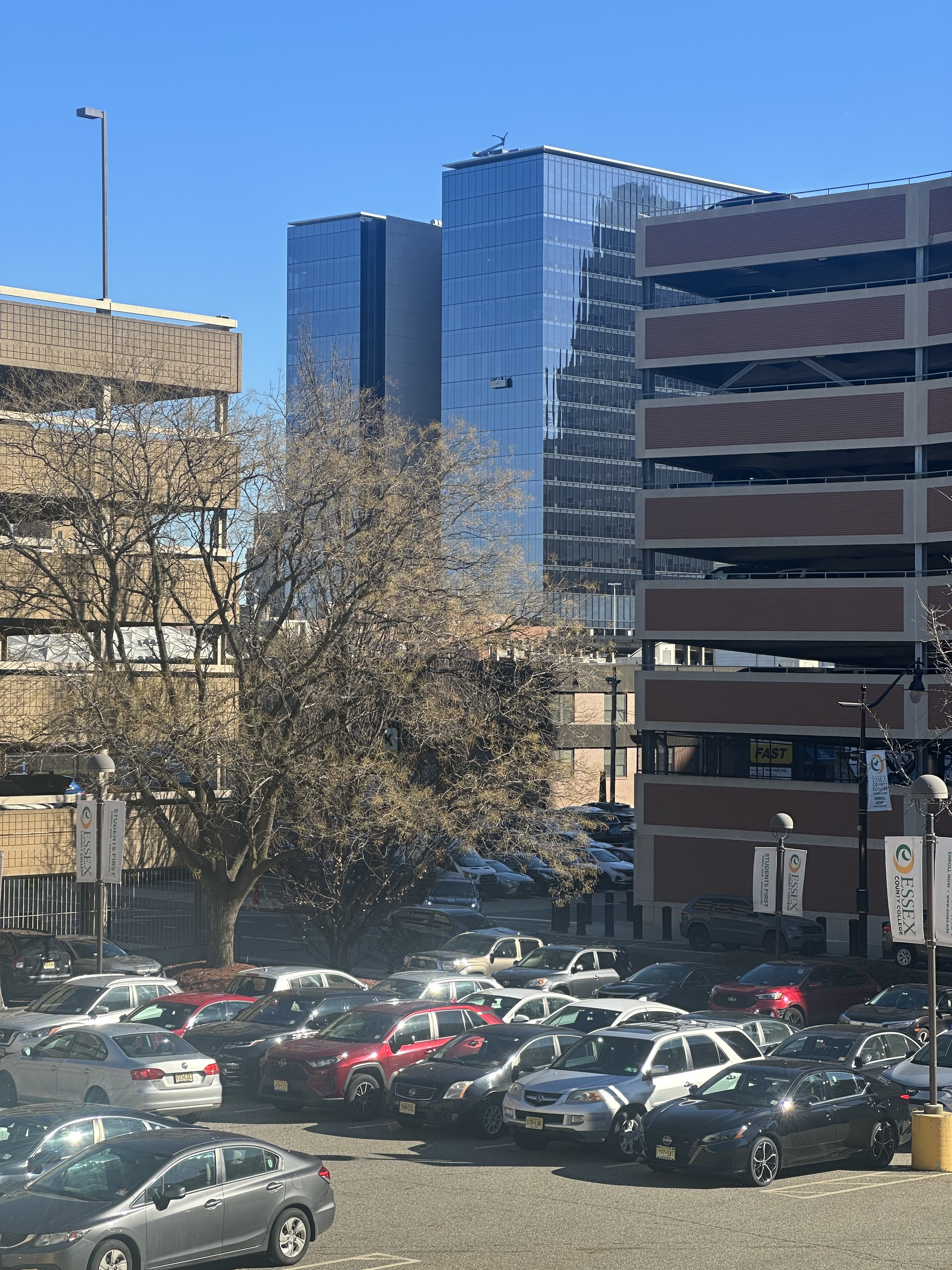
February 2024

== See also ==
- List of tallest buildings in Newark
- Prudential Tower, the second tallest building in Boston
