= Public Sculpture in Newark, New Jersey Multiple Property Submission =

- Public Sculpture in Newark, New Jersey
- U.S. National Register of Historic Places
- New Jersey Register of Historic Places
- Built: 1911–1926
- Architect: Gutzon Borglum
- MPS: Public Sculpture in Newark, New Jersey
- NRHP reference No.: 64500405 (MPS)
- NJRHP No.: 1607

Significant dates
- Added to NRHP: October 28, 1994
- Designated NJRHP: September 13, 1994

Public Sculpture in Newark, New Jersey is a Multiple Property Submission of the National Register of Historic Places (NRHP) in Newark, New Jersey that was submitted in 1994. The submission consists of several public sculptures in the city created by American sculptor Gutzon Borglum during the early 1900s. The submission was accepted by the NRHP on October 28, 1994.

== Objects listed on the submission ==
The submission lists four extant sculptures created by Borglum between 1911 and 1926. The submission additionally lists a fifth sculpture created by Borglum, Branford Place Standard, which was either removed or destroyed at an unknown date.

Image	Name	Location	Year
basic	First Landing Party of the Founders of Newark	New Jersey Performing Arts Center	1916
basic	Indian and the Puritan	Harriet Tubman Square	1916
basic	Seated Lincoln	Essex County Courthouse	1911
basic	Wars of America	Military Park	1926

== See also ==
- List of public art in Newark, New Jersey
- National Register of Historic Places listings in Essex County, New Jersey
