= One Washington Park =

Skyscraper

Coordinates: 40°44′42″N 74°10′14″W

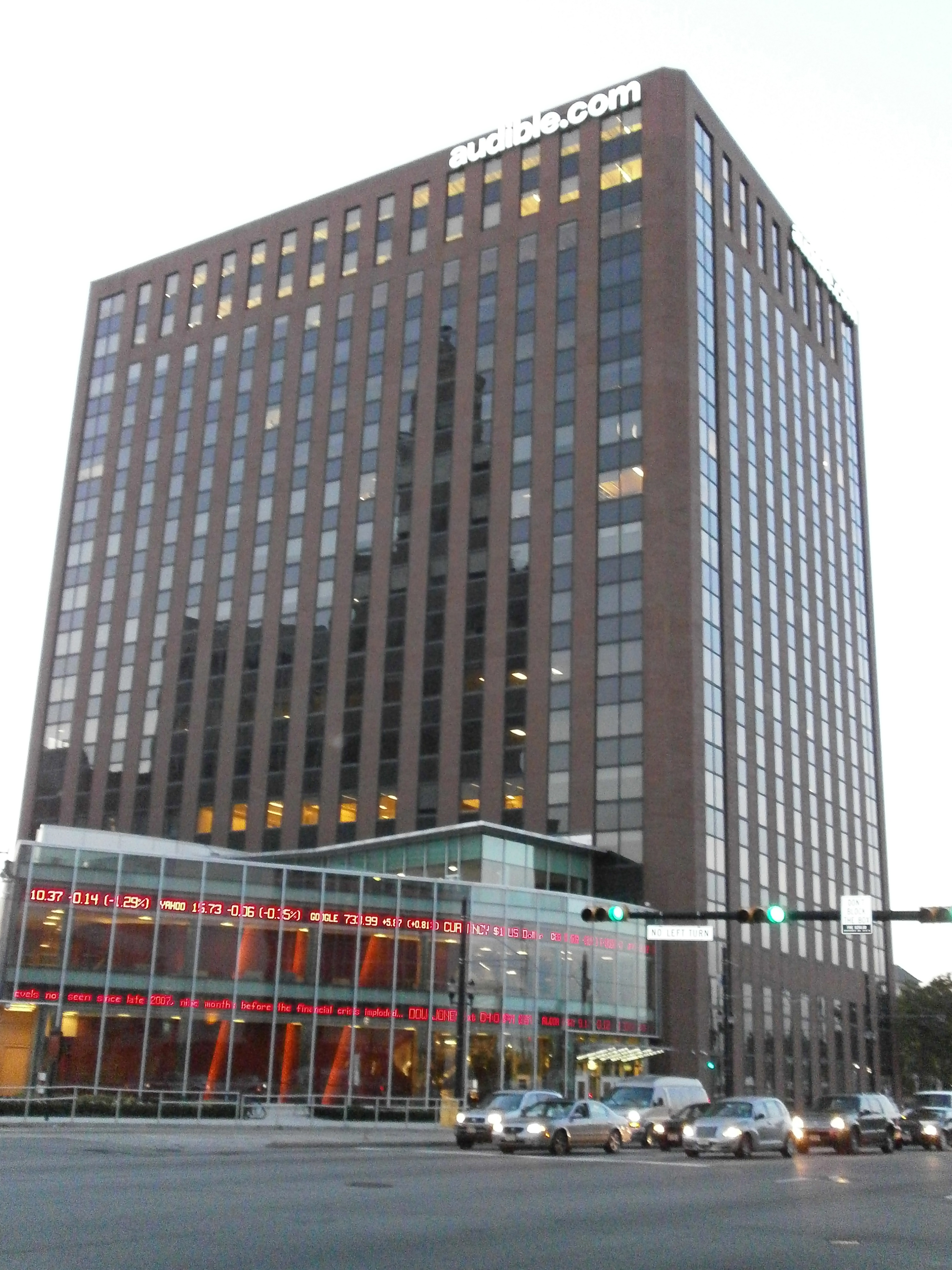
- One Washington Park's RBS entrance atrium features a digital ticker tape facing Broad Street

General information
- Type: Office/Commercial
- Location: Newark
- Completed: 1983
- Opening: 2005
- Renovated: 2005
- Owner: Rutgers University & Fidelco Group
- Operator: Washington Park Fidelco LLC

Height
- Roof: 110 m (360 ft)
- Top floor: 17

Technical details
- Floor count: 17
- Floor area: 410,248 sq ft (38,113.3 m^{2})

One Washington Park is a high rise office building located on Harriet Tubman Square at 1 Washington Street in Newark, New Jersey. Among the tallest buildings in the city, it is best known as the home of Rutgers Business School, Amazon's Audible.com, and Newark Venture Partners.

== History ==
One Washington Park was originally built by the Bell Telephone Company's New Jersey Bell (later Verizon) to serve as the local network operations center in 1983. Marc E. Berson's Fidelco Group purchased the building for $26.5 million in 2004 and renovated the building to class A office space that became available for move-in in 2005. Rutgers University purchased the first 11 floors of the building from Fidelco for $31.5 million in 2006 and invested $51.5 million in renovating them before opening the new business school facility in 2009.

In July 2015, Newark Venture Partners, a venture fund aimed to raise $50 million to invest in a select group of start-up tech companies, all of which will be housed in a so-called "accelerator", in a joint effort with Audible, which would provide mentorship, and Rutgers, which would provide space.

== Tenants ==
Floor 1

- Rutgers Business School
- Washington Park Fidelco LLC
- Aramark (One Park Bistro)

Floors 2–6, 8–11

- Rutgers Business School

Floor 7

- Newark Venture Partners and its accelerator program, NVP Labs
- Multiple NVP Labs portfolio companies

Floors 12–17

- Audible (an Amazon company)

== Amenities ==
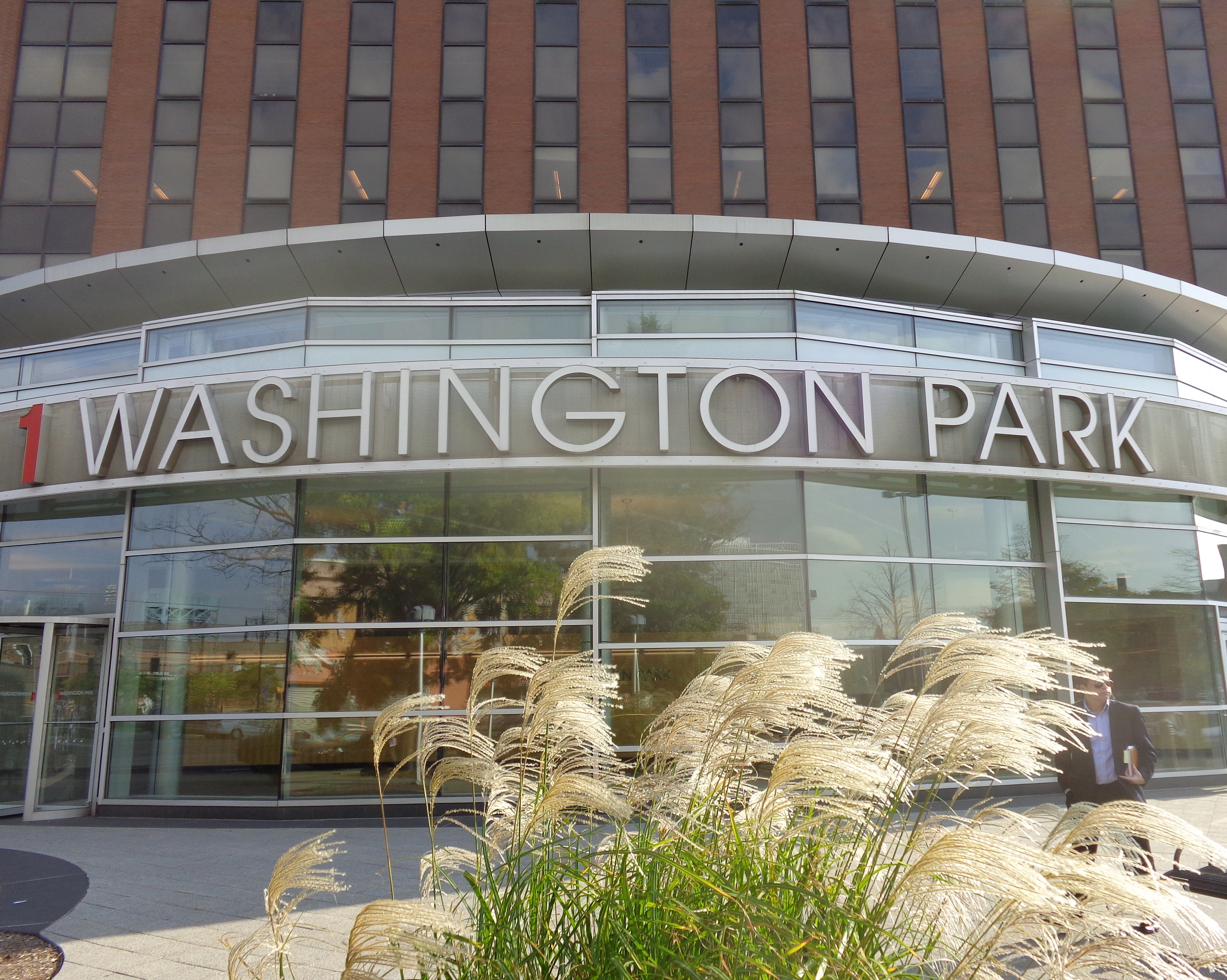
Entrance at Broad Street

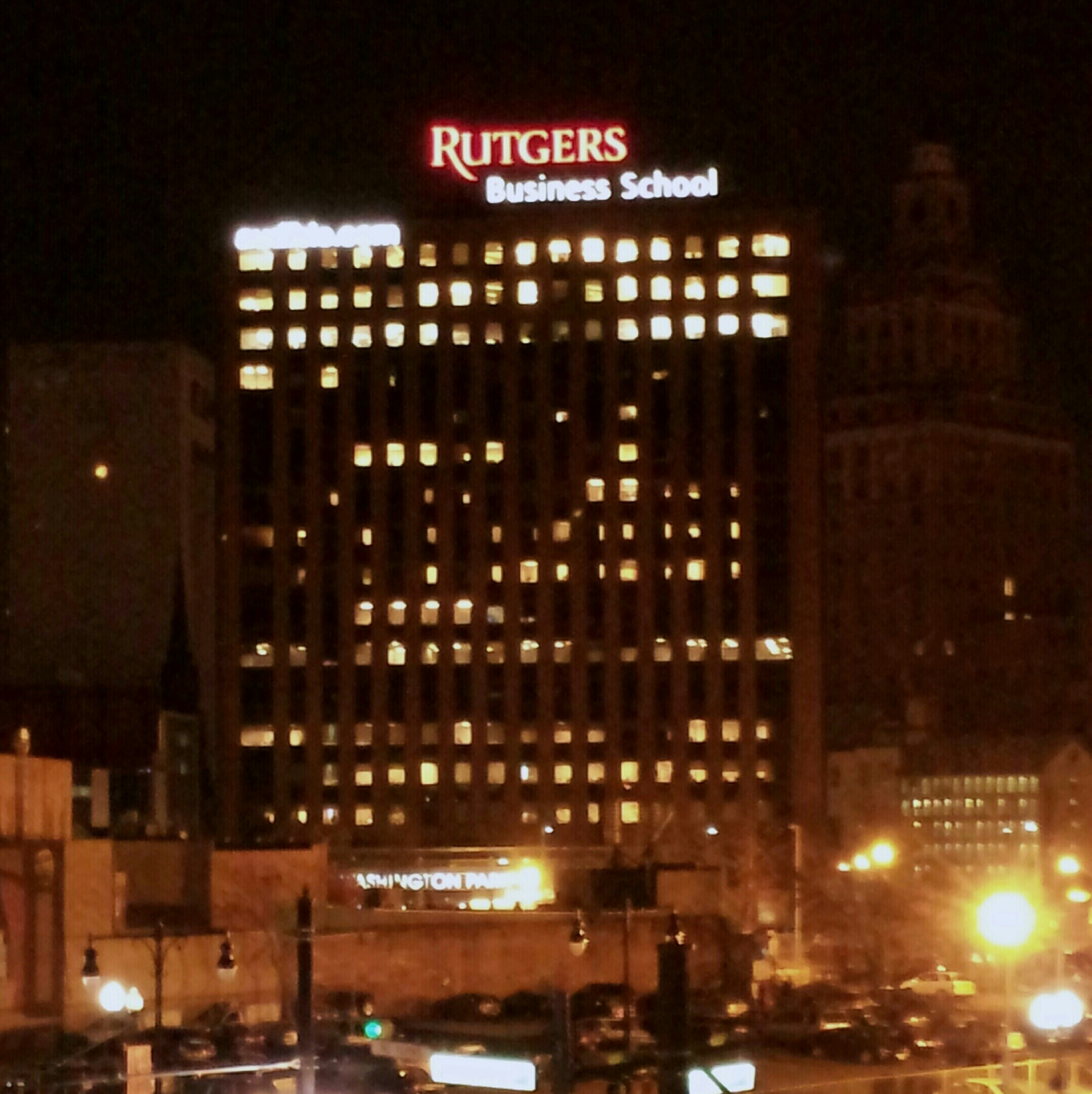
As seen from Broad Street Station

- Health Club
- Cafeteria (One Park Bistro)
- Banking
- Conference Center
- On-Site Parking

== Vicinity ==
One Washington Park is located at the northern end of Downtown Newark, across from the now closed Bears & Eagles Riverfront Stadium nearby the James Street Commons Historic District and the city's cultural district which includes the Newark Museum, Newark Public Library, and New Jersey Performing Arts Center. It is near highways and public transportation, notably Interstate 280 and Newark Broad Street Station, where there is service on New Jersey Transit Morris and Essex and Montclair-Boonton Lines (including non-stop Midtown Direct service to New York Penn Station) and Newark Light Rail service to Newark Penn Station. The Harriet Tubman Square light rail station is also nearby.

== Rutgers Business School ==
One Washington Park is home to Rutgers' full-time and Executive MBA programs, MQF program, and the Newark undergraduate program. The flex time MBA as well as the New Brunswick undergraduate programs are located on Rutgers' Livingston Campus in New Brunswick, New Jersey. RBS facilities in 1 Washington Park include classrooms, lecture halls, conference rooms, student and faculty lounges, offices, and a University Police substation. The new 3 story RBS entrance atrium features a digital ticker tape, lecture halls, a trading floor, student lounge and study spaces, a rooftop garden, and the Bove Auditorium. One Park Bistro in the lobby of the building is owned by the university and operated by the university's contracted Aramark food service but is open to all tenants with a building ID. In 2011, it was announced the Rutgers–Newark campus would further expand around Washington Park, converting the former American Insurance Company Building into graduate student housing.

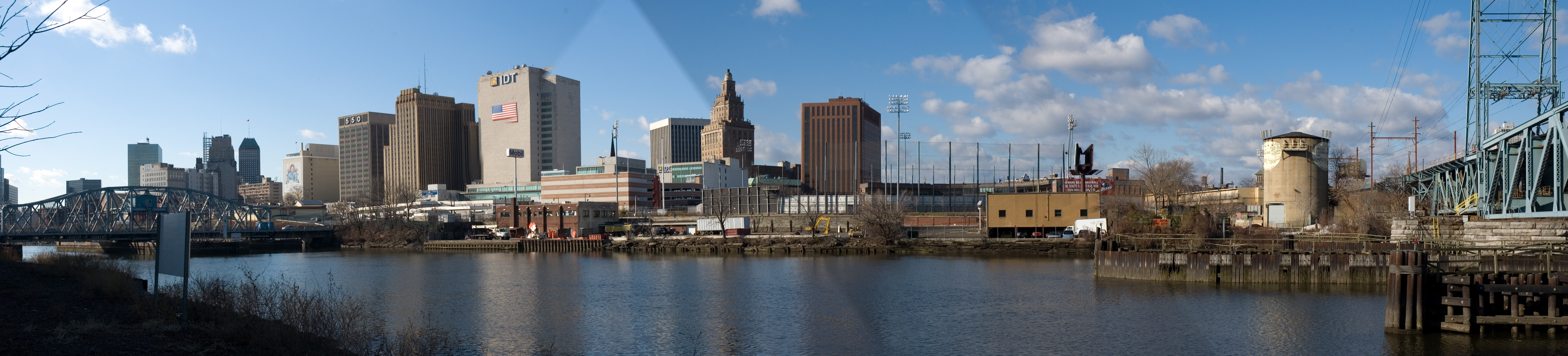
Panorama of Newark from the Passaic River. Buildings at center are clustered around Washington Park. One Washington Park is red brick, northernmost (far right) high rise building in Downtown Newark.

== Audible.com ==
Audible's offices feature a contemporary open office layout that fosters collaboration and cooperation, an entrance that displays audiobook titles and plays clips of recorded books, an original Amazon door table signed by Jeff Bezos, custom-built furniture in Audible's corporate colors, conference rooms named after notable people and places in Newark's history that can be reserved using a touch pad interface located outside each conference room door, an open staircase that wraps around the Walters-Storyk-designed recording studios used to produce audiobooks, and their own combination cafeteria, lounge, and auditorium space with kitchen.

== See also ==
- List of tallest buildings in Newark
