= Shadow of a Face =

Public monument

- Artist: Nina Cooke John
- Completion date: 2023
- Subject: Harriet Tubman
- Dimensions: 25 feet (7.6 m) cm; 40 feet (12 m) cm diameter
- Location: Newark, New Jersey, US; 40°44′36.43″N 74°10′11.61″W
- Owner: City of Newark
- Website: website

Shadow of a Face is a monument to abolitionist Harriet Tubman in Newark, New Jersey's Harriet Tubman Square designed by architect and artist Nina Cooke John. It was unveiled on March 9, 2023. It replaced a monument to Christopher Columbus in the same location which was removed in 2020 by the city to prevent its toppling in a Black Lives Matter protest. Several other monuments are in the park.

== Design ==
The design is governed in plan by circles, which symbolize community connection across time and space, according to Cooke John. It is 25 feet (7.6 m) tall and 40 feet (12 m) wide. The monument is made of a curved poured-in-place concrete wall with a six foot tall bas-relief of Tubman's face on the side facing the Newark Museum of Art and a mosaic of blue tiles made by community members on the other. A second curved wall made of wood slats on the exterior and corten steel on the interior contains a timeline of Tubman's life as well as panels that present information on Black liberation history in the city and state. A 25-foot tall black steel silhouette of Tubman rises from the monument's interior. An abstracted cape made of black steel and plastic conduit floats over the wood slat wall. There is one bench made of concrete and wood slats in the monument's interior and one on the exterior. The outline of Columbus's plinth is inscribed in the ground.

Integrated speakers play audio narrating Tubman's life by Newark native Queen Latifah and reflections from community members. Lights within the silhouette and in the ground light up the monument at night. Signs on a steel electricity box explain the monument and the park's history. The monument is encircled with hexagonal concrete pavers, some of which are engraved with donor names, and a short pink granite retaining wall that defines the park from the sidewalk.

The name of the work was inspired by "Runagate Runagate" a 1962 Robert Hayden poem which references Tubman.

== History ==
In October 2020, Mayor of Newark Ras Baraka announced that the city would replace the monument to Columbus with one to Harriet Tubman with the City of Newark commissioning five local artists to present proposals to a 14-person jury. In June 2021, the city announced the selection of Cooke John to complete the monument.

Community members have disputed Tubman's connection to Newark and the decision to rename the park in her honor. Some have also criticized the removal of Columbus without a public hearing as erasing an important part of American history.

The monument was originally rejected by a state historic preservation panel (the park and statue of Columbus are contributing properties to the James Street Commons Historic District) for not adequately consulting with the area's Italian community and asked to be presented with a plan that included statues to both Columbus and Tubman. The panel was subsequently overruled by a state commissioner, allowing the construction of Cooke John's proposal.

The project is a Grace Farms Design for Freedom pilot project, meaning many of its materials were examined to ensure that they were produced with forced labor-free materials.

The monument was unveiled on March 9, 2023, by Mayor Ras Baraka, First Lady of New Jersey Tammy Murphy, Queen Latifah, Cooke John, Don Katz and other local dignitaries following a press conference at Audible's Innovation Cathredral.

The monument's surrounding hardscape was completed in November 2023, including the addition of a short pink granite retaining wall and completion of the paved area.

== See also ==
- List of public art in Newark, New Jersey
- Harriet Tubman Museum in Cape May, New Jersey
