= Washington Park station =

Washington Park station may refer to:

- Washington Park station (MetroLink), a light rail station in East St. Louis, Illinois
- Washington Park station (Newark Light Rail), a light rail station in Newark, New Jersey
- Washington Park station (TriMet), a light rail station in Portland, Oregon
