= First Landing Party of the Founders of Newark =

- U.S. National Register of Historic Places
- New Jersey Register of Historic Places
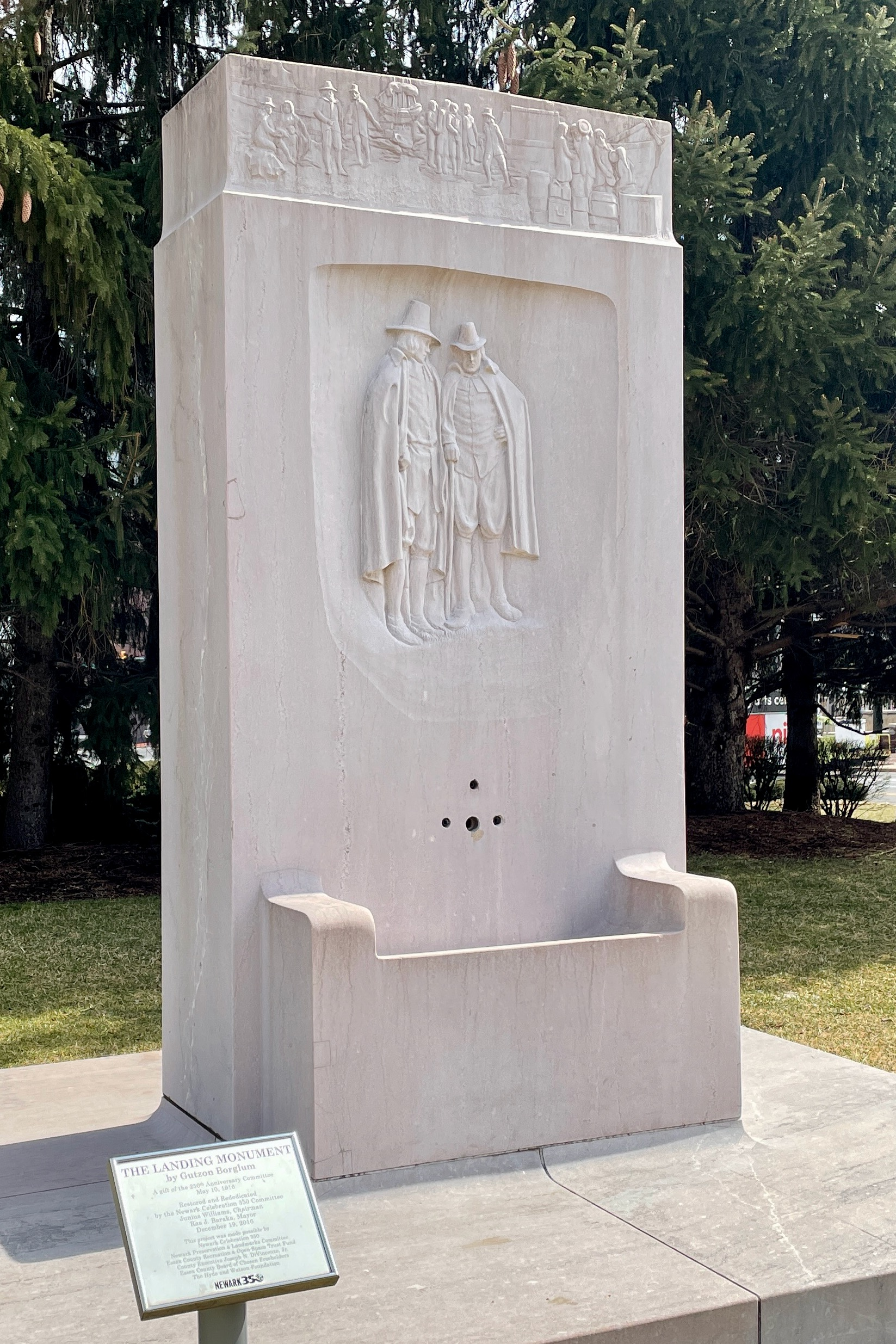

- Location within Essex County, New Jersey Location within New Jersey Location within the United States
- Location: Newark, New Jersey
- Coordinates: 40°44′22″N 74°9′58″W
- Built: 1916
- Architect: Gutzon Borglum
- MPS: Public Sculpture in Newark MPS
- NRHP reference No.: 64500405
- NJRHP No.: 3119
- Designated NJRHP: August 29, 1990

First Landing Party of the Founders of Newark is a marble monument with bas-relief and inscription by sculptor Gutzon Borglum (1867–1941) near the New Jersey Performing Arts Center in Newark, New Jersey. It was dedicated in 1916. It was listed on the New Jersey Register of Historic Places in 1990 and the National Register of Historic Places in 1994 as part of the Public Sculpture in Newark, New Jersey Multiple Property Submission.

== Description and original location ==
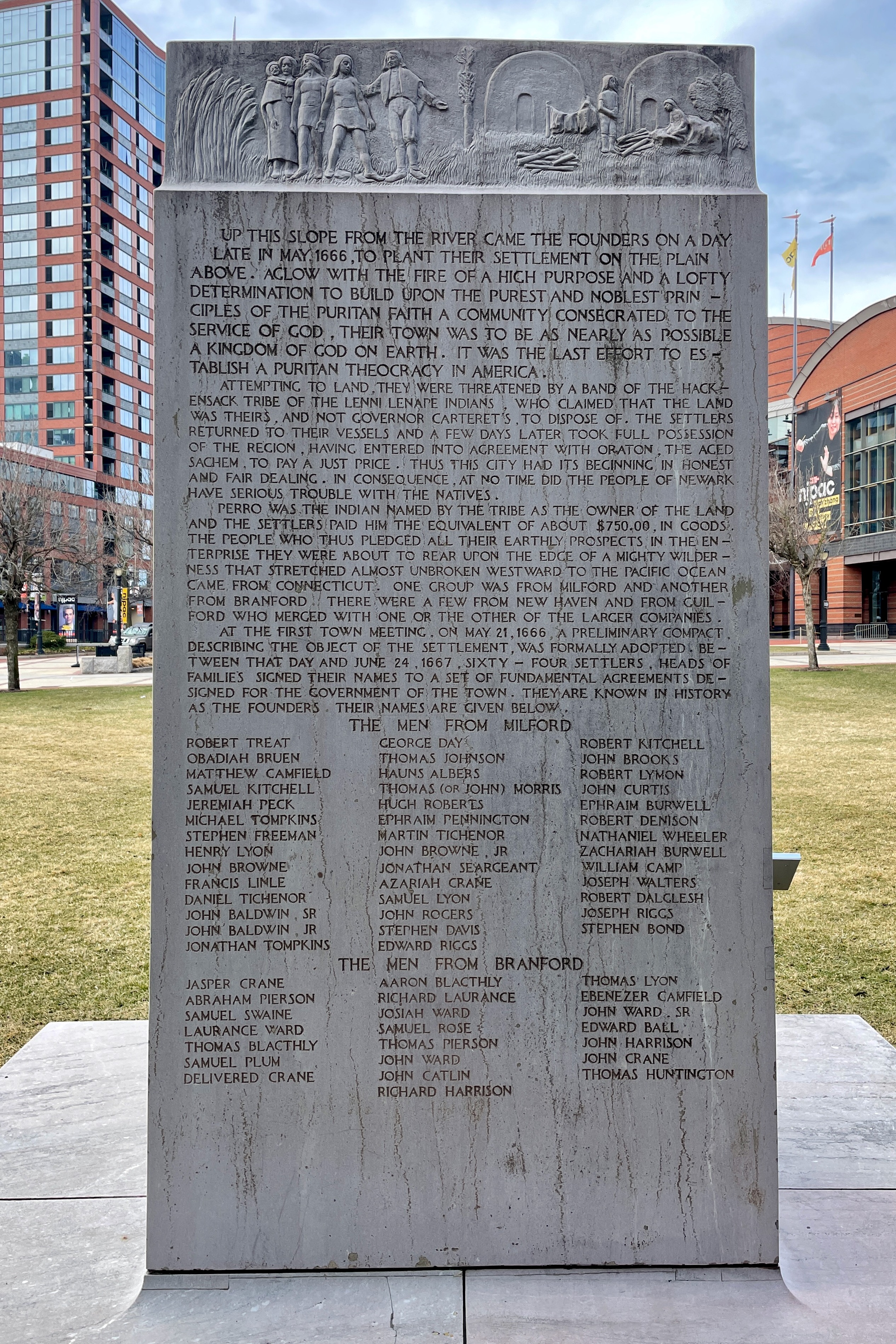
Inscription on the back of the stele

This piece is one of several erected across the United States by Gutzon Borglum, the Mount Rushmore sculptor, in his quest to institute "art that is real and American". The work commemorates the Connecticut Puritans who established the city in 1666. It is marble stele with a relief of two male Pilgrims in conversation overlooking a well or spring; above that is a narrow frieze that is a series of images representing Pilgrims in daily life. The stele rests in the center of a flat rectangular stone base, at the foot of which is a fountain basin. The back of the stele is engraved with the names of Newark's founders. The sculpture is 9 feet (2.7 m) tall and weighs 13,000 pounds (5,900 kg).

The monument is alternatively known as the Pilgrim Drinking Fountain and the Bridge Memorial. It marks the spot where the Passaic River and an early road converged, which became the site of the original colonial market. The First Landing Party of the Founders of Newark was originally located in Landing Place Park, at the foot of Saybrook Place near the Park Place station of the Hudson and Manhattan Railroad.

== Newark works by Borglum and historic designation ==
First Landing Party of the Founders of Newark is one of four public art works created by Mount Rushmore sculptor Gutzon Borglum that are located in Newark, the others being Seated Lincoln (1911), Indian and the Puritan (1916), and Wars of America (1926). The three other pieces were added to the New Jersey Register of Historic Places on September 13, 1994, and the National Register of Historic Places on October 28, 1994, as part of a Multiple Property Submission, "The Public Sculpture of John de la Mothe Gutzon Borglum, 1911–1926".

== Misplacement and restoration ==
The sculpture went missing for more than a decade. When the New Jersey Performing Arts Center (NJPAC) was being built in the 1990s Saybrook Place was eliminated and the statue was moved two blocks north to Lombardy Park. When the Newark Light Rail was constructed in 2002 it was moved again. The circumstances are unclear, but it was brought to a lot at the city's Division of Traffic and Signals, where it was all but forgotten. Interest was aroused in anticipation of Newark's 350th anniversary of its founding. Restoration was funded by the Essex County Board of Freeholders, the Open Space Trust Fund, the Hyde & Watson Foundation, and individual donors. It was rededicated in 2016 on a grassy knoll near the NJPAC/Center Street station of the Newark Light Rail.

In 2022, to coincide with NJPAC's ArtSide campus expansion, this monument was once again demolished by NJPAC and placed in storage by the City of Newark. It was removed without notifying local constituents and without required approvals from the City of Newark's Landmarks and Historic Preservation Commission.

== See also ==
- List of public art in Newark, New Jersey
- National Register of Historic Places listings in Essex County, New Jersey
