= New Jersey Performing Arts Center =

Performing arts center in Newark, New Jersey, US

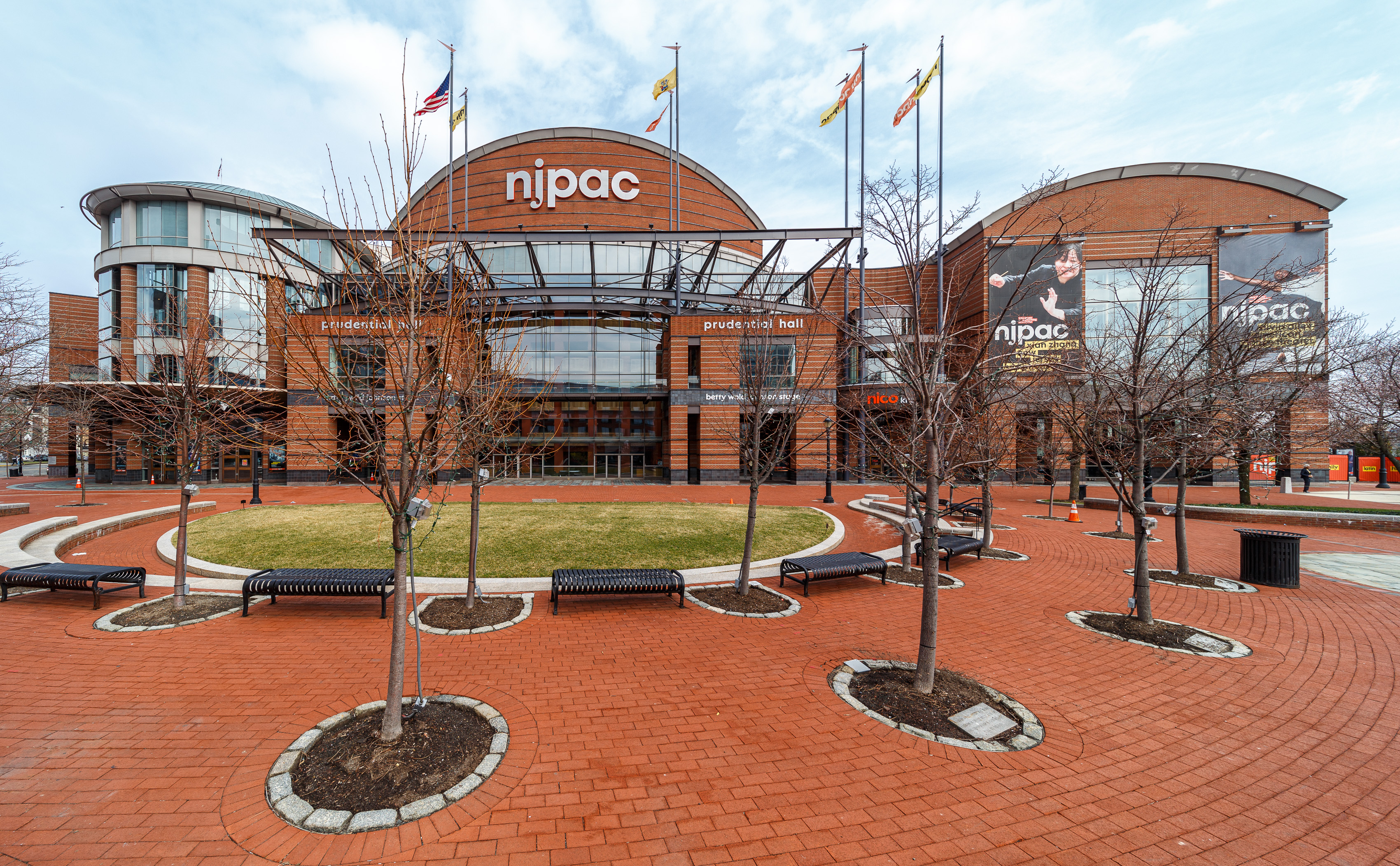
- New Jersey Performing Arts Center in Newark, New Jersey
- Interactive map of New Jersey Performing Arts Center
- Address: 1 Center Street; Newark, New Jersey; United States
- Coordinates: 40.7401467°N 74.1679199°W
- Capacity: Prudential Hall: 2,868; Victoria Theatre: 514; The Chase Room: 350; Horizon Theater: 88
- Type: Performing arts center
- Public transit: Newark Light Rail at NJPAC / Center Street: Broad Street – Newark Penn Newark Penn Station

Construction
- Opened: 1997
- Architect: Barton Myers

Website
- www.njpac.org

The New Jersey Performing Arts Center (NJPAC) is one of the largest performing arts centers in the United States, and is situated in Newark, New Jersey. Home to the New Jersey Symphony Orchestra (NJSO), more than nine million visitors (including more than one million children) have visited the center since it opened in October 1997 on the site of the former Military Park Hotel.

NJPAC has been an important component in revitalization of New Jersey's largest city. Located just west of the Passaic River waterfront, the Center lies in the heart of the city's cultural district around Military Park and Washington Park that also includes The Newark Museum, New Jersey Historical Society, and the Newark Public Library. The Prudential Center is just to the south.

Philip S. Thomas was named Vice President of Arts Education in 1992. NJPAC has one of the largest arts education programs offered by a performing arts center in the nation. The program includes arts training classes, scholarships, in-school residencies, professional development, and family and children's programming, allowing students, teachers and families to interact with professional artists and explore the various genres of music, theater, dance, poetry and more.

== Performance halls and other facilities ==
- Prudential Hall, a 2,800-seat hall arranged in four horseshoe-shaped tiers, with boxes and orchestra seating. It is typically used for opera, ballet, symphony orchestra, pop/rock concerts, and Broadway series performances. During ensemble performances, concert towers are positioned on the stage. During opera/dance performances, these towers can be removed to allow for more space on stage. At this hall, the orchestra pit can serve as a stage extension or become an additional seating area, if the need arises.
- Victoria Theatre, a 514-seat theater equipped with orchestra-level and single balcony seating. It is typically used for theatrical production, chamber recital, contemporary dance, jazz, popular music, and experimental theater performances. The theater is capable of reducing sound reverberance level with its extendable acoustic curtains.
- The Chase Room, with 350 seats, is home to center's cabaret performance series, bi-annual hip hop festival, and spoken word series.
- Horizon Theater, an 88-seat black box theater
- Cathedral House, a center for arts education linked to the civil rights movement

== History ==
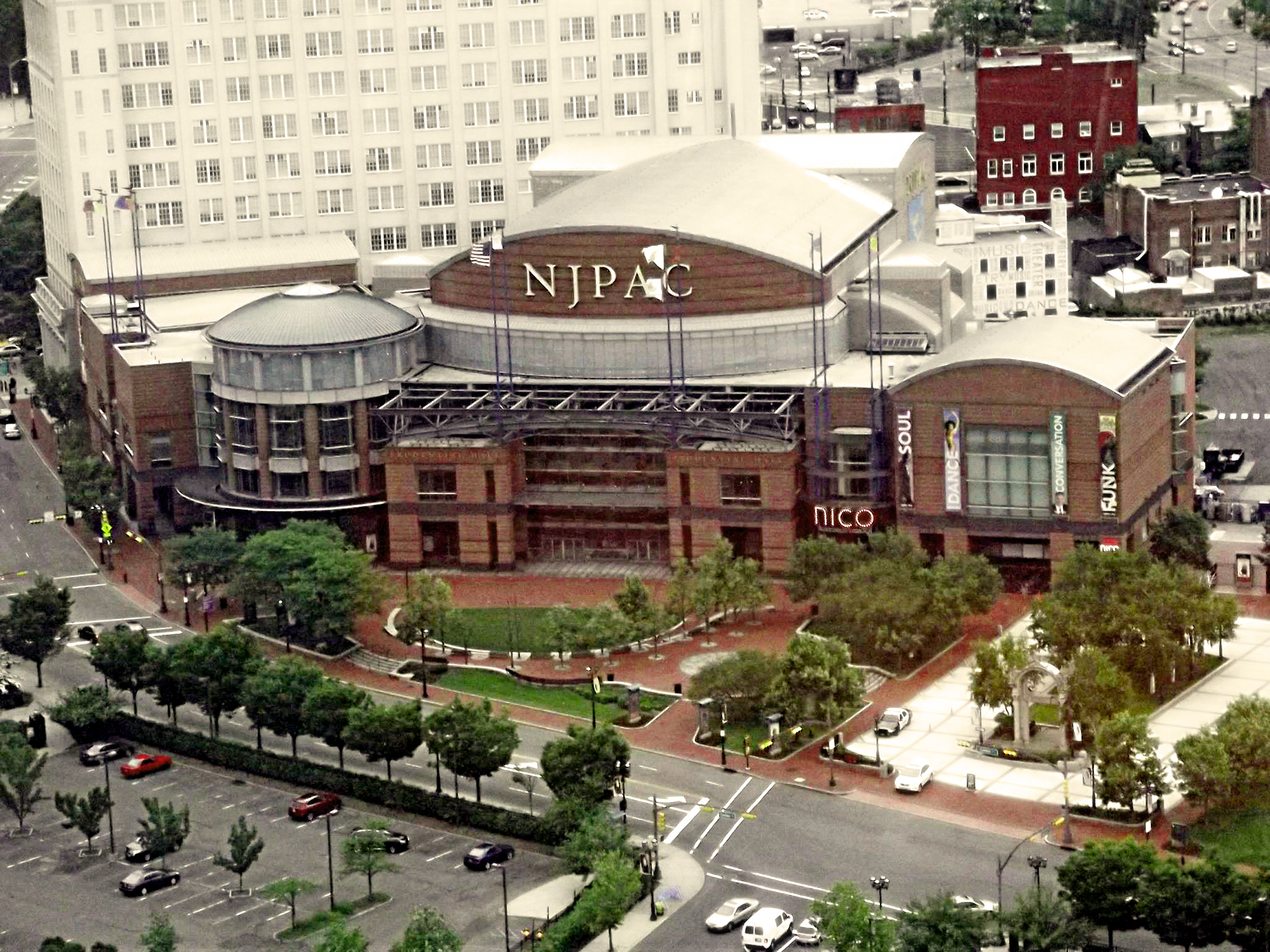
Aerial view

The State of New Jersey decided to build a world class performing arts center in 1986, when then Governor of New Jersey Thomas Kean appointed a committee to decide the location and the needs of New Jersey's performing arts organization. They chose Newark over other cities because of the density of the surrounding areas, proximity to New York City, highway and rail access to the site, and a location inside a city in need of revitalization. The last reason was considered especially important. A major goal of NJPAC was to help revitalize the city, bringing people back into blighted areas and providing jobs.

== Planning, Design and Construction ==
The planning commission decided that the new center would be directly integrated into the city, encouraged walking, and provided a plaza for the city. Previous redevelopment schemes in Newark, such as the Gateway Center had all involved skyways that connected all the main office buildings to Newark Penn Station above street level, further segregating the city. The master plan, executed by the design teams, Skidmore, Owings and Merrill and James Stewart Polshek consisted of plazas and pedestrian boulevards, joining major thoroughfares.

The master plan and building design was led by Gail L. Thompson, AIA. An architect herself, Ms. Thompson was brought on board in 1990 as Vice President of Planning, Design and Construction. Following the completion and acceptance of the project's 14-acre master plan, which called of a 2750-seat multipurpose hall, a 500-seat studio theater, a restaurant, a plaza and numerous supporting spaces and functions, Ms. Thompson set about leading an architect selection process to find a renowned architect, capable of providing an iconic design.

Barton Myers was chosen as the lead architect, based on his experience with theaters and his ability for contextual design. Instead of a monument to the arts, Myers saw it as another part of the city; reflecting the familiar to residents and inviting them to engage with it. He related the physical structure to the context by using brick, exposed steel, and glass as the materials, to reflect the industrial roots of Newark.

Russell Johnson, widely considered the world's foremost expert on acoustic design, and his firm Artec was the next key addition to the design team. Joshua Dachs, of Fisher Dachs Associates led the theater design.

Groundbreaking ceremonies took place in October 1993 with speeches by dignitaries and performances by Kathleen Battle and the Newark Boys Chorus, among others. During the bidding process, NJPAC Board mandated that construction job hiring reflect the diversity of community in which would be built. During the construction phase, Ms. Thompson worked with Gustav Heningburg, NJPAC's long time community relations advisor, to ensure that this mandate was met, and in fact exceeded. Ms. Thompson successfully implemented this program, making sure that minority involvement was meaningful and created growth opportunities for minority companies and workers involved in the project. thirty-nine percent of the workforce were black and hispanic. While a number of key positions were also held by women. This incredible collaborative effort was celebrated in the first concert, the Hard Hat Concert held at NJPAC for the construction workers, companies and their families.

Construction began in 1995 and was successfully completed in 1997. Ms. Thompson attributed the on-time completion to making the construction phase a "cause-celeb" shared by the construction companies, workers, inspectors, and unions to have a fully completed project to show off to their families for the September Hard Hat Concert, strategically scheduled a month before the gala opening in October 1997.

The project received numerous accolades including recognition for project management of the design and construction phase, and with its architectural design and acoustics receiving rave reviews by The New York Times architecture critic Herbert Muschamp upon its opening. The New Yorker has said that it houses one of the best modern concert halls on the Eastern Seaboard - handsome in appearance, warm in sound. This is most remarkable as the design is of a multi-purpose hall that is also intended to house opera, ballet, and theater, in addition to functioning as a concert hall. This is attributed to the initial design goals set out for the team - to design a multi-purpose hall capable of excellence in each of the performing arts.

First Landing Party of the Founders of Newark is one of four public art works created by Gutzon Borglum that are located in Newark (the others being Seated Lincoln (1911), Indian and the Puritan (1916), Wars of America (1926)). The four pieces were added to the New Jersey Register of Historic Places on September 13, 1994, and the National Register of Historic Places on October 28, 1994. It was restored to the grounds on NJPAC in 2016 and then subsequently demolished by NJPAC in 2022 without approval from the City of Newark's Landmarks & Historic Preservation Commission.

== Programming ==
Stephanie Hughley was named the Vice President of Programming in 1995. Since opening, artists and celebrities that have appeared on NJPAC's stages include the Boston Symphony Orchestra; Yo-Yo Ma, Paul Simon, Bob Dylan, Diana Krall, Alvin Ailey American Dance Theater, Chicago Symphony Orchestra, Twyla Tharp Dance, Dance Theatre of Harlem, singer Ronnie Spector (the Hard Hat show for construction workers and their families, before the venue's official fall of 1997 opening), Dire Straits, Israel Philharmonic, Nancy Wilson and Ramsey Lewis, Royal Danish Ballet, Hilary Hahn, Bill T. Jones, Itzhak Perlman, Sting, Les Ballets Trockadero de Monte Carlo, Elvis Costello, King Crimson, Yes, Jethro Tull, the National Song & Dance Company of Mozambique, the Afro-Cuban All-Stars, Audra McDonald, the Buena Vista Social Club, The Chieftains, Dulce Pontes, Alice Coltrane, David Cassidy, Salt-N-Pepa, Gilberto Santa Rosa, Jerry Seinfeld, Kevin Hart, Christine Ebersole, Jennifer Hudson, Herbie Hancock, Sweet Honey in the Rock, Garrison Keillor, Maurizio Pollini, Gewandhaus Orchestra, Balé Folclorico da Bahia, Peter, Paul & Mary, Savion Glover, Aspen Santa Fe Ballet, Art Garfunkel, Kodo Drummers, Kirov Orchestra, Frankie Valli, Martha Graham Dance, Johnny Mathis, New Edition, Angelique Kidjo, Renee Fleming, Evgeny Kissin, Adam Sandler, Chiara Taigi and Dream Theater.

A regular season is presented by the New Jersey Symphony Orchestra.

NJPAC has attracted over 9 million patrons (including 1 million children) since its October 18, 1997 Opening Night.

In 2001 NJPAC was awarded the Rudy Bruner Award for Urban Excellence silver medal.

In 2011, John Schreiber replaced Lawrence P. Goldman as President/CEO of the center, .

In October 2017, NJPAC unveiled a strategic partnership with Madison Marquette, a real estate developer working on Asbury Park's artistic renaissance. As part of the partnership, NJPAC will produce live performances, arts education and community engagement events in Asbury Park. There will also be events at Asbury Park Boadwalk's 3,600-person Convention Hall and 1,600-seat Paramount Theatre. ^{4}

In addition to programs like Shen Yun and The Piano Guys concert, there are also frequent free events. There are dance workshops for all levels and ages, and concerts by musicians like Roni Ben-Hur.

== Festivals and special events ==
=== TD James Moody Jazz Festival ===
The James Moody Jazz Festival is held annually. In October 2012, the Arts Center inaugurated the event as the TD James Moody Democracy of Jazz Festival, now known as the TD James Moody Jazz Festival, Newark's first major jazz festival in 15 years, in tribute to Newark native James Moody (saxophonist).

=== North to Shore Festival ===
NJPAC co-produces the North to Shore festival held annually in the threw New Jersey cities of Newark, Asbury Park, and Atlantic City.

=== Other festivals and events ===
The 2010, Geraldine R. Dodge Poetry Festival took place in Newark for the first time, with NJPAC hosting the festivals and many of its events. The festival returned in 2012. The Newark Peace Education Summit, attended by the 14th Dalai Lama (aka Tenzin Gyatso) and other dignitaries, guest took place in May 2011. NJPAC hosted the seventh season of the reality show competition America's Got Talent. Each summer for the past 16 years, the Arts Center has also hosted a free, outdoor music festival, entitled Horizon Foundation Sounds of the city, the free concerts take place in NJPAC's Theater Square each Thursday night in July and August.

NJPAC partnered with Fairleigh Dickinson University for a special program called the, "New Jersey Speaker Series." This annual event will be in its fifth year after its 2018-2019 line-up. Many notable speakers come together in this event including 42nd President of the United States, Bill Clinton, and former Prime Minister of the United Kingdom, David Cameron.

== NJPAC's Center for Arts Education ==
NJPAC's Center for Arts Education, where many of the classrooms and offices for the center's arts education department reside, is situated adjacent to the center at 24 Rector St. After undergoing adaptive reuse renovations in Spring 2001, the building houses classes and staff year round. The facility includes a theater, two dance studios, seven classrooms, nine practice rooms, and office space.

== Cathedral House ==
The Center for Arts Education was housed in the Cathedral House at 24 Rector St. This building was built in 1941 by father and son architects, John and Wilson Ely, as the rectory for Trinity & St. Philip's Cathedral. Over decades of use, the building had become a site of civil rights activism, social justice, and community organizing.

After renovations in 2001, Cathedral House was decorated with exterior murals by graphic designer and painter Paula Scher in her style known as "super-graphics." The design, which used words in condensed lettering with black outlines to represent the programs taught in the building, became a signature environmental graphic for NJPAC. This mural has been featured in books and exhibited in museums, including the Cooper Hewitt Design Museum at the Smithsonian.

Cathedral House is a landmark registered with the National Register of Historic Places, as well as a contributing structure within the Military Park Commons Historic District. In 2022, NJPAC unsuccessfully proposed to demolish Cathedral House to build a surface parking lot for diesel trucks. Facing community resistance, and citing the importance of this building to the civil rights and Black Power movement, NJPAC relented and agreed to preserve the building. In 2025, despite numerous financial conflicts of interest, a majority of members of the City of Newark's Landmarks & Historic Preservation Commission approved NJPAC's demolition of this structure. In a contested vote, the Landmarks Commission overruled the earlier agreement to preserve this structure, as well as a 1993 Memorandum of Understanding requiring NJPAC to preserve the building.

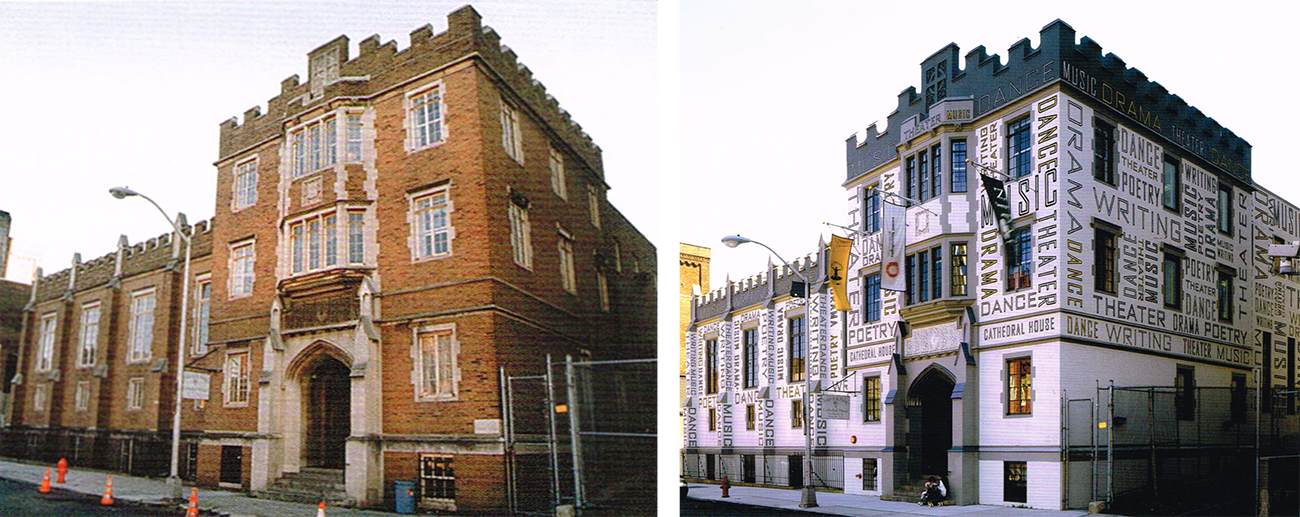
Paula Scher's created this mural for the Arts Education space of the New Jersey Performing Arts Center (24 Rector Street in Newark, NJ)

== Women's Association of NJPAC ==
The Women's Association of NJPAC (WA) was formed back in 1994, prior to the opening of the building itself. The WA was founded by Joan Budd, Patti Chambers, Sally Chubb, Ronnie Goldberg, Sheila Labrecque, Gabriella Morris, Pat Ryan, Phyllis Cerf Wagner, and, Diana Vagelos. Through their efforts, the association has successfully raised over $50 million for NJPAC and the aforementioned Center for Arts Education. They currently have approximately 2000 members and are looking for more members that are willing to contribute to the Newark culture and have a love for the arts. The WA fundraises through many different events such as the Spotlight Gala and the annual Spring Luncheon and Auction.

== Transportation ==
Newark Light Rail service opened as July 17, 2006, at the NJPAC/Center Street station, connecting the site with Broad Street Station and Penn Station Newark.

== Lionsgate Newark ==
In 2022, NJPAC partnered with Great Point Studios to announce a major new film and television production studio overlooking Weequahic Park and Weequahic Golf Course, to be called "Lionsgate Newark Studios." The studio opens in 2024 on the 15-acre former Seth Boyden housing projects site at 101 Center Terrace in the Dayton section of the city near Evergreen Cemetery. Lionsgate Newark will be owned and operated by Great Point Studios and will partner with NJPAC on public relations and community affairs with NJPAC.

== The ArtSide project at NJPAC ==
In 2024, NJPAC broke ground on the ArtSide, a $336 million dollar plan to build new housing, retail space and an arts hub on NJPAC's Newark campus.

== See also ==
- New Jersey music venues by capacity
- Robert Treat Center
- Newark Symphony Hall
- Firemen's Insurance Company's Home Office Building
- Critical Regionalism, the style of architecture.
- List of concert halls
- Trilogy: An Opera Company
