= Equestrian statue of George Washington (Newark) =

Statue by J. Massey Rhind in Newark, New Jersey

George Washington
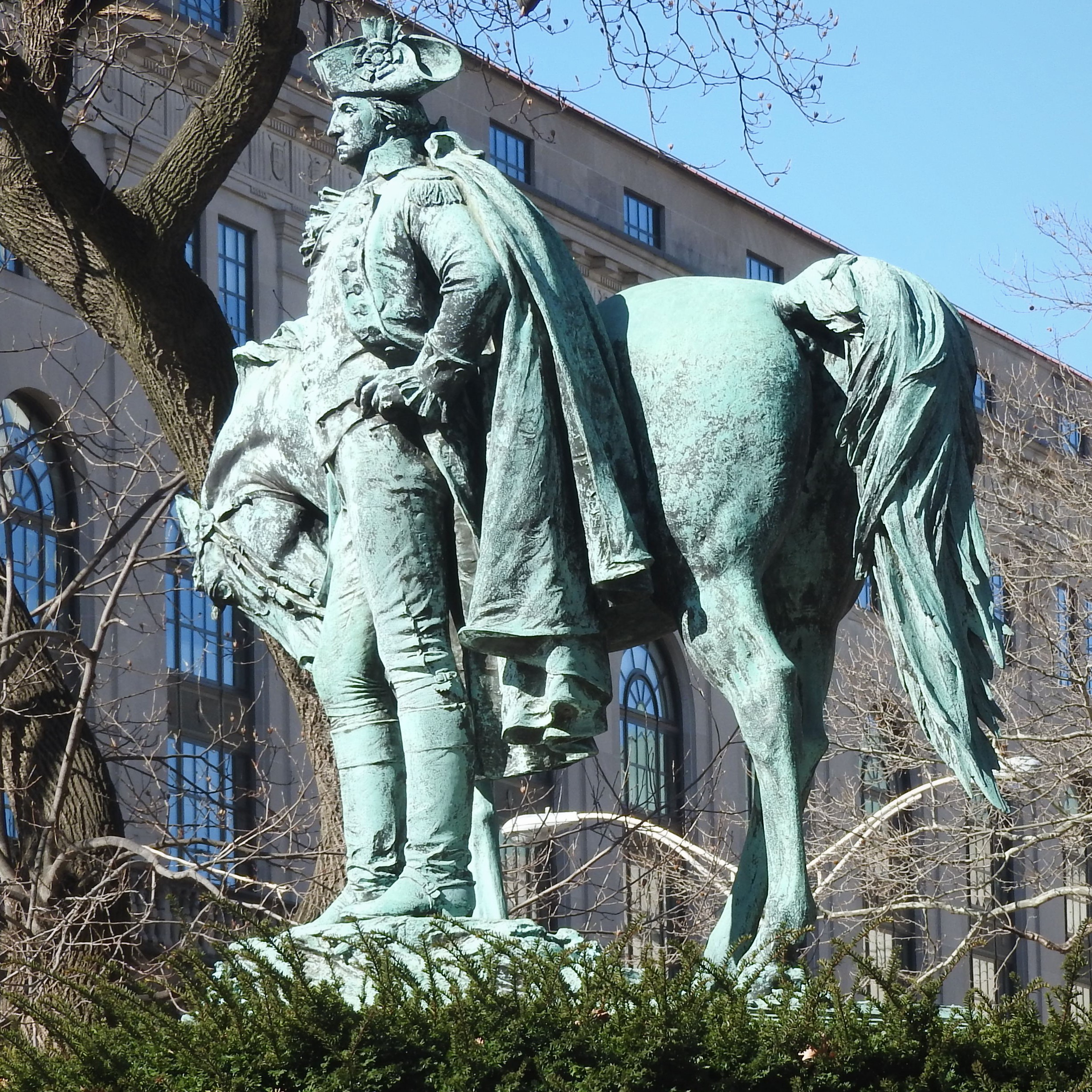
- George Washington in profile

- Location within Essex County, New Jersey Location within New Jersey Location within the United States
- Artist: J. Massey Rhind
- Year: 1912
- Medium: Bronze sculpture
- Subject: George Washington
- Dimensions: 2.6 m × 1.7 m × 3.8 m (8.5 ft × 5.5 ft × 12.5 ft)
- Location: Washington Park Newark, New Jersey; 40°44′33.4″N 74°10′10.9″W
- George Washington
- U.S. Historic district – Contributing property
- Part of: James Street Commons Historic District. (ID78001758)
- Designated CP: January 9, 1978

George Washington is an outdoor equestrian statue by the Scottish-American sculptor J. Massey Rhind located in Harriet Tubman Square (formerly Washington Park) in Newark, New Jersey. It depicts General George Washington saying farewell to the troops of the Continental Army on November 2, 1783, and was dedicated on the anniversary of that event in 1912.

== History ==
Sculptor J. Massey Rhind was commissioned to do the work, funded by the bequest of Amos H. Van Horn (1840–1908), owner of one of the largest furniture stores in Newark. Born in Edinburgh, Rhind (1860–1936) had a workshop in New York City and was known for the classical caryatids at Macy's Department Store on 34th Street. Rhind's proposal was for a distinctive equestrian statue, showing General Washington saying farewell to the troops and standing beside, rather than mounted on, his horse, which helped secure the commission. The statue was cast in 1912 by the Roman Bronze Works of New York City, which had also done the casting of Rhind's sculptures for the Stephenson Grand Army of the Republic Memorial in Washington, D.C. George Washington was installed in Newark's Washington Park and dedicated on November 2, 1912, the anniversary of the event depicted. President William H. Taft was scheduled to deliver an address at the dedication, but then had to attend the funeral of vice-president James S. Sherman, who had died three days earlier, on October 30.

== Description ==
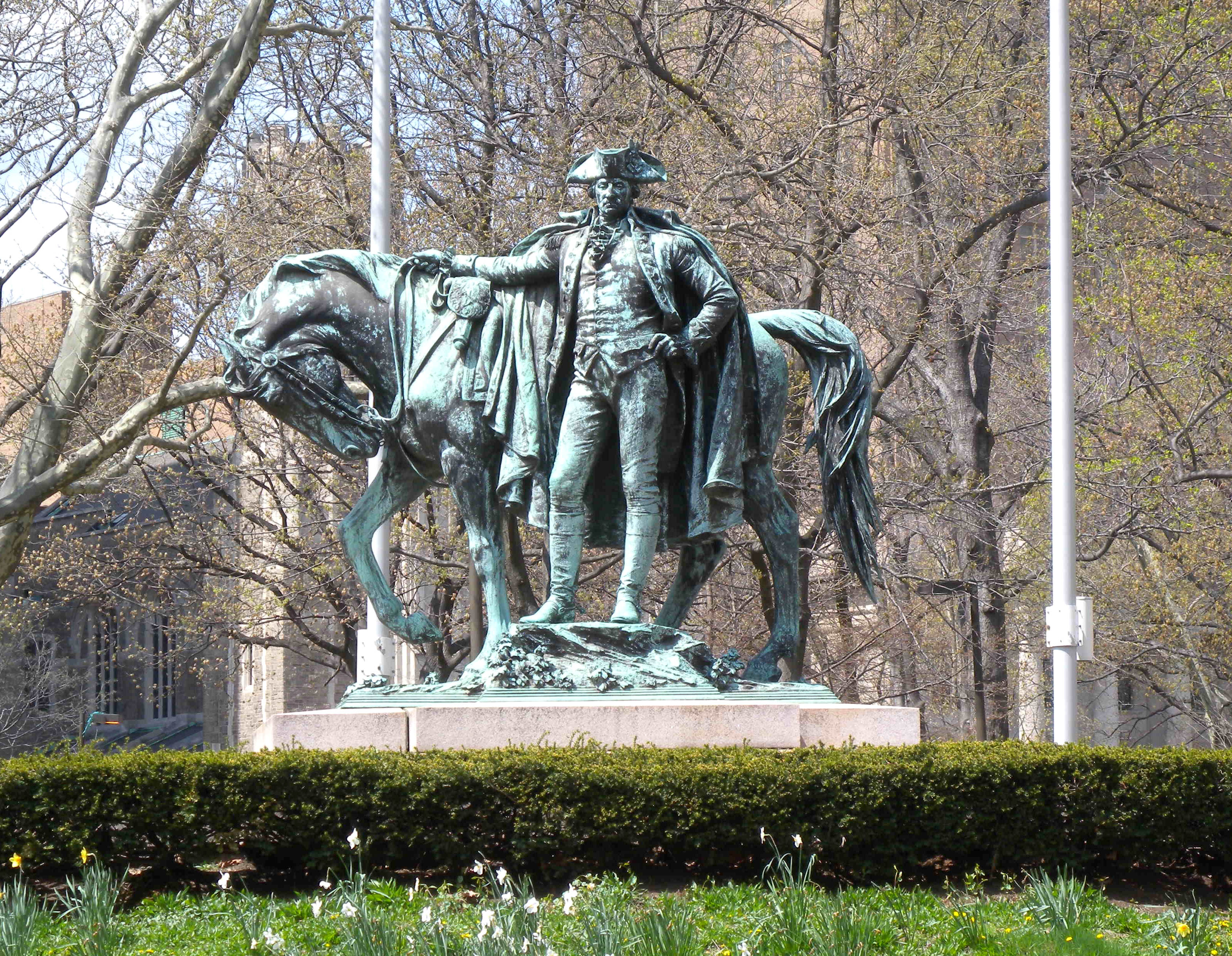
The statue in Newark's Washington Park

The bronze sculpture depicts General Washington saying his farewell address to the troops of the Continental Army at Rocky Hill, New Jersey, on November 2, 1783. This event was after word of the peace treaty ending the American Revolutionary War had arrived from Paris. The statue shows Washington, dismounted from his horse, in military uniform, and with a riding cloak over his shoulder. His horse is shown with a raised foot and lowered head. The statue measures approximately 8 feet 6 inches (2.59 m) high x 5 feet 6 inches (1.68 m) wide x 12 feet 6 inches (3.81 m) long and is on a stone base that measures approximately 2 feet (0.61 m) high x 14 feet 8 inches (4.47 m) wide x 15 feet 7 inches (4.75 m) long.

== Legacy ==
After its dedication in 1912, brewery mogul Christian William Feigenspan commissioned Rhind for a copy of the equestrian statue of Bartolomeo Colleoni in Venice. The statue was dedicated in Newark's Clinton Park (now Lincoln Park) on July 28, 1916.

The Washington statue was added to the National Register of Historic Places as a contributing property of the James Street Commons Historic District on January 9, 1978. It was surveyed by the Save Outdoor Sculpture program of the Smithsonian American Art Museum in 1995.

== See also ==
- List of public art in Newark, New Jersey
- List of statues of George Washington
- List of sculptures of presidents of the United States
- List of equestrian statues in the United States
- New Jersey in the American Revolution
- Timeline of Newark, New Jersey
- Rockingham – Where Washington wrote his farewell orders
