= Rutgers University Police Department =

- Patch of the RUPD
- Common name: University Police, Rutgers Police
- Abbreviation: RUPD

Jurisdictional structure
- Operations jurisdiction: New Jersey, USA
- General nature: Local civilian police

Operational structure
- Police Officers: 114
- Agency executives: Kenneth Cop, Chief, New Brunswick; Carmelo "John" Huertas, Chief, Newark; Richard Dinan, Chief, Camden

Website
- http://rupd.rutgers.edu/

The Rutgers University Police Department (RUPD) is a campus police agency responsible for law enforcement on the New Brunswick, Newark, and Camden campuses of Rutgers University. RUPD is a department of the university's Division of Administration and Public Safety, overseen by Rutgers Institutional Planning and Operations (IP&O) which also houses Rutgers University Emergency Services (RUES) which is responsible for Emergency Medical Services and emergency management on the campus as well as responding to fire and hazardous materials emergencies in coordination with local first responders. The Division of Administration and Public Safety also oversees the campus bus system, the Rutgers Golf Course, and other services on campus.

RUPD is a fully empowered law enforcement entity under state law with state-wide jurisdiction. Its jurisdiction is shared with local police departments, such as the New Brunswick Police Dept and the Middlesex County Sheriff's Office, and the New Jersey State Police. RUPD works closely with these agencies as well as neighboring police departments and the adjacent campus police departments of UMDNJ in Newark and New Brunswick, NJIT and Essex County College in Newark, and Rowan University and Camden County College in Camden.

RUPD staff includes fully trained, commissioned, and armed Police Officers as well as Security Officers, 911 Dispatchers, and student Community Service Officers. Rutgers Emergency Services staff includes trained firefighters, incident managers, emergency medical technicians, hazardous materials technicians, and instructors who are on duty 24 hours a day seven days a week.

== Locations ==
Camden

- Administrative Services Building

Newark

- RUPD Newark Headquarters (Parking Deck 1)
- One Washington Park Police Substation (Rutgers Business School)
- The University Hospital

New Brunswick

- Public Safety Building
- Cook Campus Police Substation

== Community Service Officers & Mounted Unit ==
RUPD employs part-time community service officers. CSOs are required to be full-time students at Rutgers University and are assigned to either the Newark or New Brunswick division. CSOs report directly to RUPD Security Services, as well as have their own internal ranking hierarchy. A Security Lieutenant oversees each campus division. CSOs effectively function as Security Officers and are non-sworn, unarmed employees of RUPD and Rutgers University. Responsibilities include stadium traffic control, bag checks, foot patrols, mounted patrols, vehicle patrols, operation of the Knight Mover shuttle, and event security. The program's purpose is to provide employment opportunities and give exposure to the law enforcement field.

The program is the only one of its kind in the country with its own horse-mounted patrol (Rutgers University Mounted Patrol or RUMP) run by university students. The horses live and are cared for at Rutgers Farms on Cook/Douglass campus.

A smaller, separate program for Rutgers University Emergency Services (RUES) is also offered to students, allowing full-time students to become part-time Emergency Service Officers (ESO). ESOs focus on fire prevention and medical issues rather than law enforcement.

== Notable incidents ==
- On February 8, 2012, Rutgers Police and the FBI arrested sophomore Elan Haba for possession of explosive materials in his dorm room on the Newark campus.
- On April 13, 2013, Rutgers Police responded alongside officers from the New Brunswick Police Department to quell the riot that had started at the annual Delafest celebration, resulting in several arrests for aggravated assault on police and underage consumption of alcohol. Rutgers Police and the New Brunswick Police Department have overlapping jurisdiction which has been known to cause issues. As a result, in 2014 both departments were criticized for failing to map out where each department has primary jurisdiction.
