= Rutgers Business School – Newark and New Brunswick =

Business school of Rutgers University (Newark & New Brunswick)

Coordinates: 40.52552°N 74.43821°W

Rutgers Business School
- Motto: Sol iustitiae et occidentem illustra.
- Motto in English: Sun of righteousness, shine upon the West also.
- Type: Public business school
- Established: 1929; 97 years ago
- Affiliations: Rutgers University
- Dean: Lei Lei
- Faculty: 212
- Students: 10,982
- Undergraduates: 8,984
- Postgraduates: 1,875
- Doctoral students: 95
- Other students: Non-Matriculating students: 28
- Location: Newark and New Brunswick, New Jersey, United States
- Campus: Urban/suburban
- Website: business.rutgers.edu

Rutgers Business School – Newark and New Brunswick or RBS is the graduate and undergraduate business school located on the Newark and New Brunswick campuses of Rutgers University. It was founded in 1929. It operated under several different names (the undergraduate Rutgers School of Business in New Brunswick and the Rutgers Graduate School of Management in Newark) before consolidating into Rutgers Business School. The Rutgers School of Business in Camden remained a separate Rutgers University business school and was not part of the Newark/New Brunswick consolidation.

Rutgers Business School offers bachelor's, master's, and doctoral degrees.

== Facilities ==
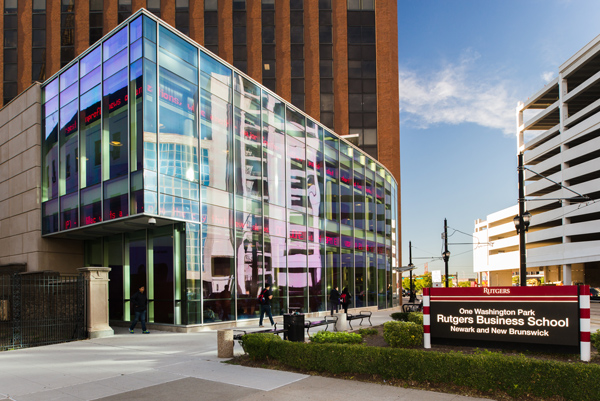
Rutgers Business School, Newark reflecting the city in the glass front.

Rutgers facilities in One Washington Park include classrooms, lecture halls, conference rooms, student and faculty lounges, offices, and a University Police substation. In 2011, it was announced the Rutgers–Newark campus would further expand around Washington Park, converting the former American Insurance Company Building into graduate student housing.

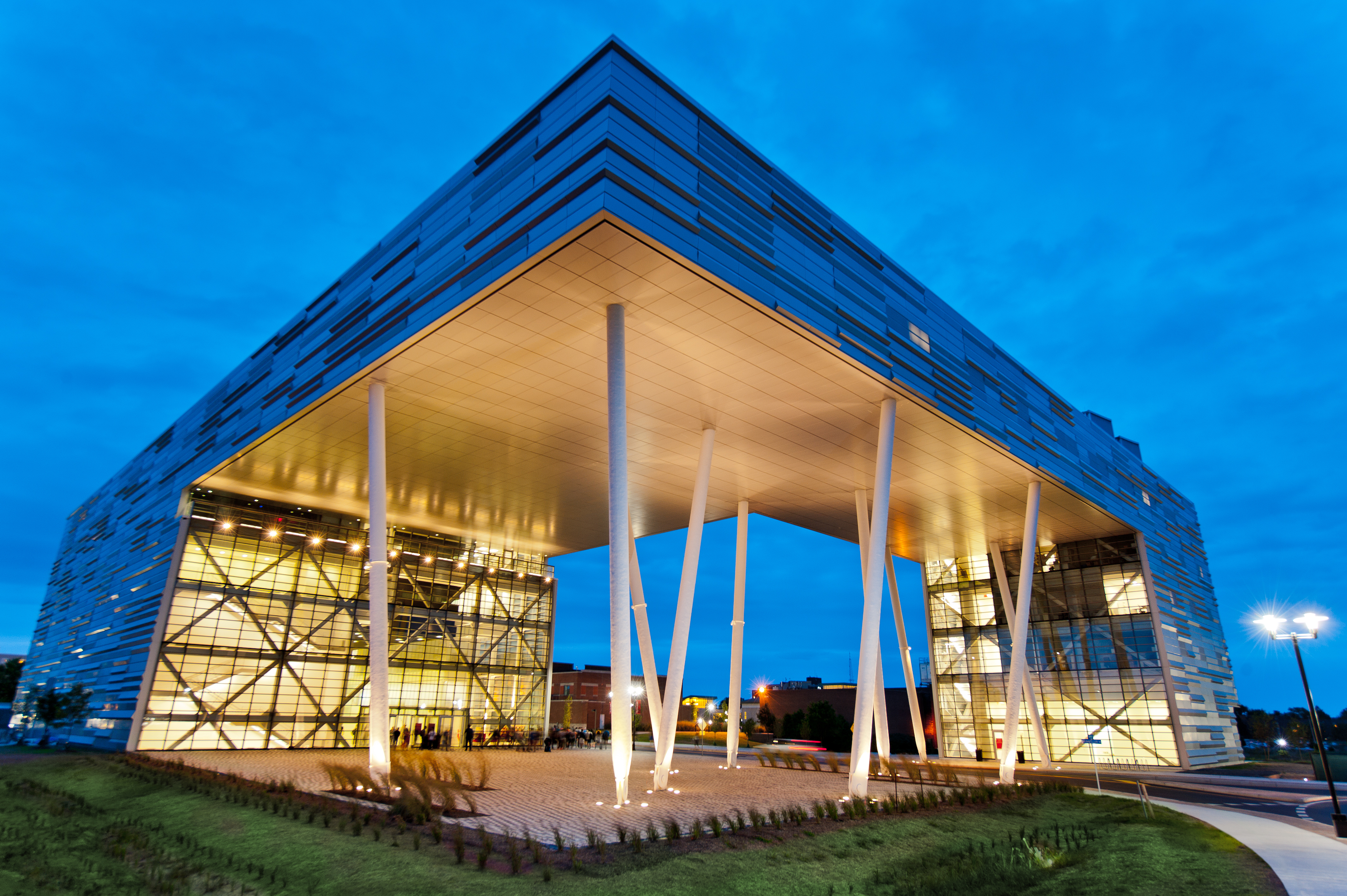
Rutgers Business School, New Brunswick, on the Livingston Campus. New glass and steel building at nightfall.

== Accreditation and rankings ==
Business school rankings

United States
- Bloomberg MBA: 44

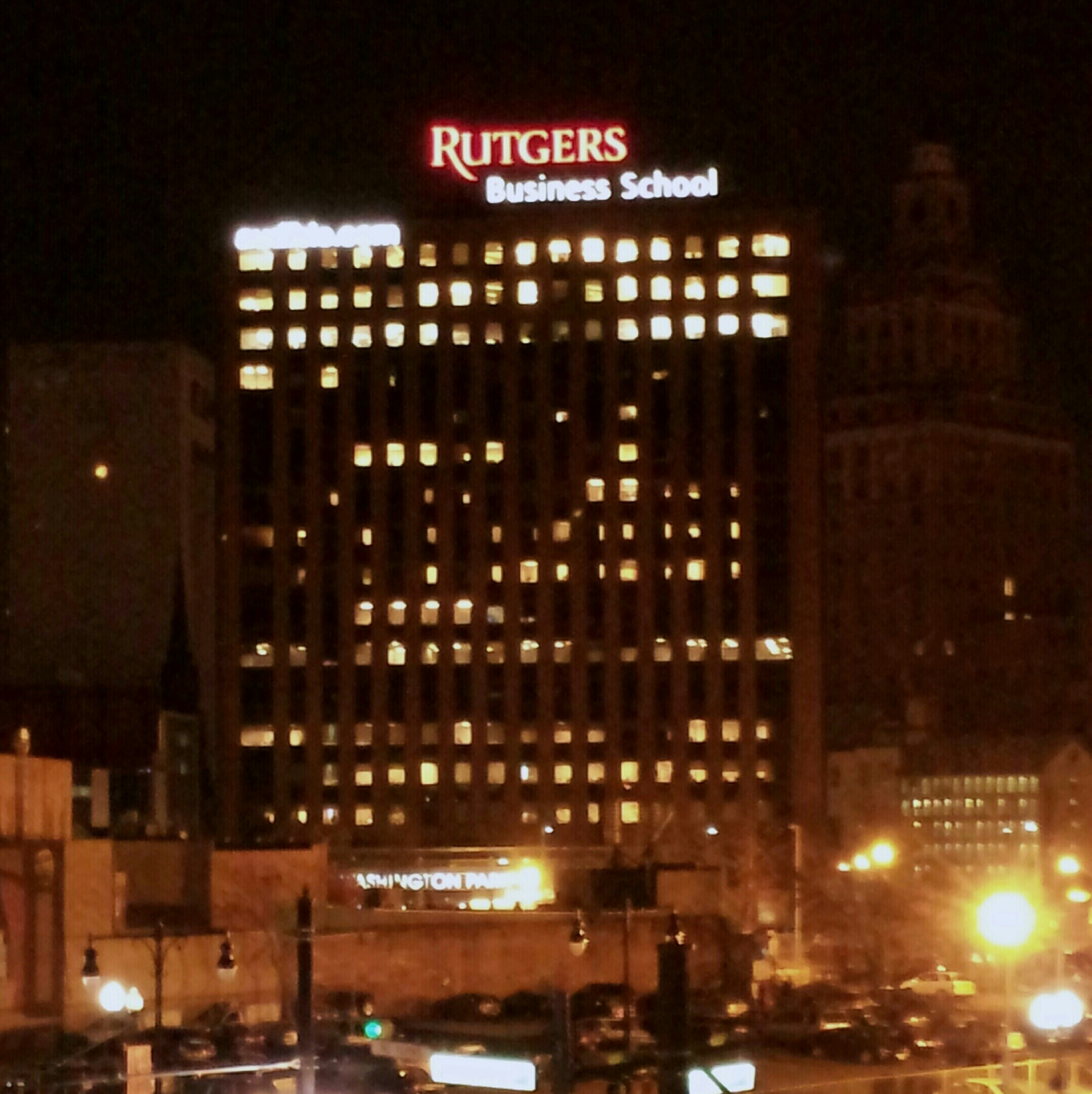
One Washington Park as seen from Newark Broad Street station

RBS is accredited by the Association to Advance Collegiate Schools of Business (AACSB) as well as the Accreditation Council for Pharmacy Education while Rutgers University as a whole is accredited by the Middle States Association of Colleges and Schools.

U.S. News & World Report ranked RBS #39 (tie) "2027 Best Undergraduate Business Programs" in the U.S. (#25 among public business schools).

RBS is ranked by US News #44 in Best Business Schools and 23rd in Part-time MBA nationwide.

For the 2026-2027 school year, Bloomberg ranked Rutgers Business School #51 in the nation.

In April 2022, a lawsuit accused RBS of creating fake jobs for graduates to boost MBA program rankings. The lawsuit was expanded into a class-action lawsuit. The lawsuits were dismissed in Federal Court in September 2023.

== Research centers ==
In April 2017, Rutgers Business School accepted $1 million from IFlytek to create a big data research laboratory. The same company was later placed on a Bureau of Industry and Security blacklist for allegedly enabling human rights abuses in Xinjiang with its technology.

== See also ==
- List of Rutgers University people
- Post-secondary education in New Jersey
- List of universities named after people
- List of United States business school rankings
- List of business schools in the United States
- Lists of business schools
