= NJPAC/Center Street station =

NJPAC/Center St.
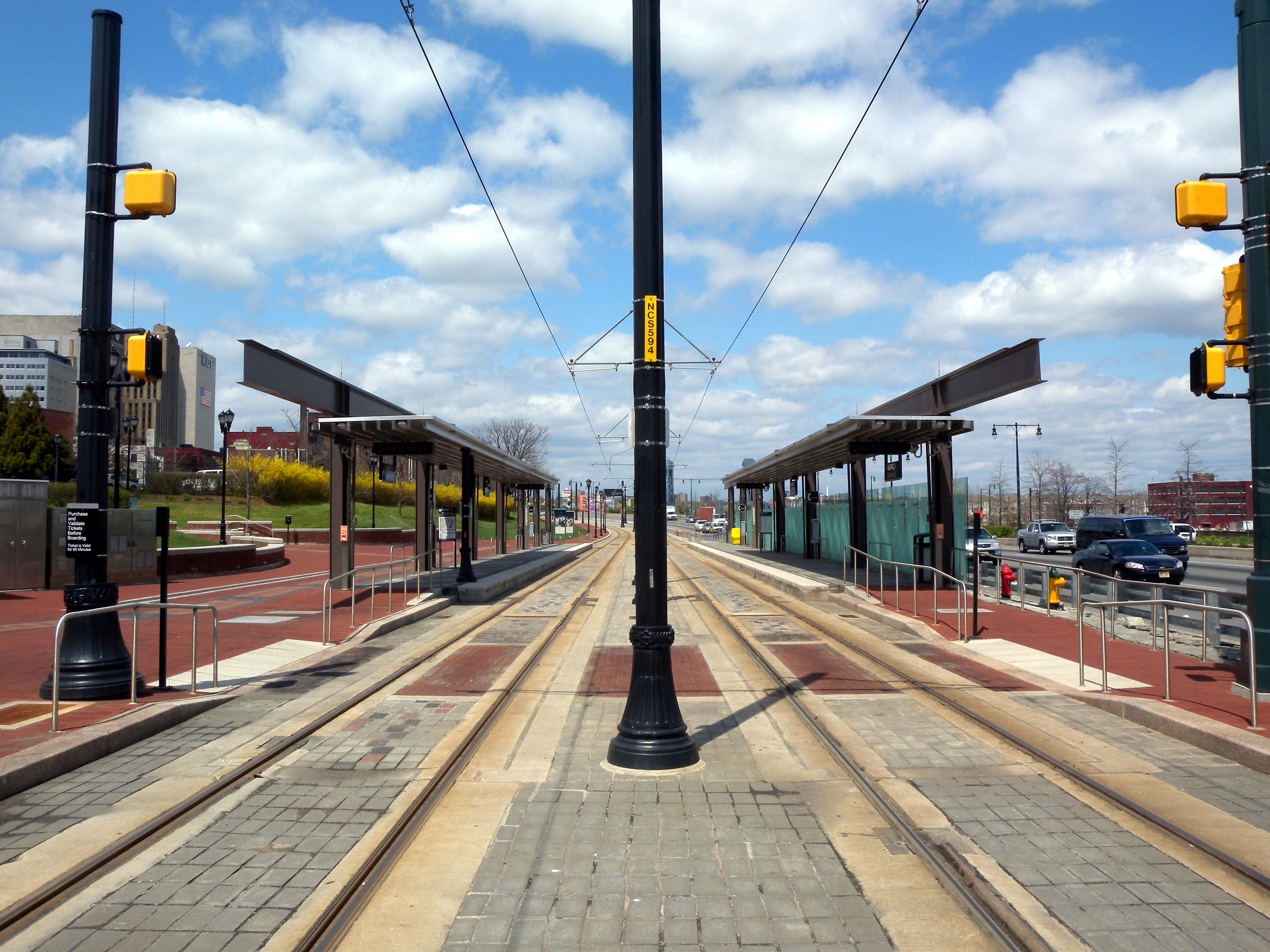
- NJPAC/Center Street station platforms

General information
- Location: McCarter Highway and Center Street; Newark, New Jersey
- Coordinates: 40°44′22″N 74°09′56″W
- Owner: New Jersey Transit
- Platforms: 2 side platforms
- Tracks: 2

Construction
- Structure type: At-grade
- Cycle facilities: Yes
- Accessible: Yes

Other information
- Station code: 30773
- Fare zone: 1

History
- Opened: July 17, 2006

Passengers
- 2025: 74 (average weekday)
- Rank: 15 of 17

Services
Preceding station	NJ Transit	Following station
Atlantic Street toward Broad Street	Broad Street – Newark Penn	Newark Penn Terminus
Harriet Tubman Square toward Broad Street	Broad Street – Newark Penn	Newark Penn Terminus
Location

NJPAC/Center Street station is a light rail station on the Newark Light Rail's Broad Street Extension. It is located in Downtown Newark, New Jersey, on the south west corner of the McCarter Highway and Center Street at the New Jersey Performing Arts Center (NJPAC) at the northern end of Military Park. The station is above ground, as is the rest of the line to the north. To the south, after crossing Center Street, the train enters a tunnel to the underground station at Newark Penn Station. NJPAC/Center Street is the southernmost station on this line, which links two of Newark's three train stations. To the south of Center Street is Newark Penn Station and to the north is Broad Street Station with stops at Atlantic Street and Riverfront Stadium on game days. Riding southbound the train leaves Broad Street and stops at Harriet Tubman Square, NJPAC/Center Street, and Penn Station. Service on this line opened on July 17, 2006, at 1:00 p.m. EDT.
