= Explorers Program at Newark Museum =

Newark Museum Explorers Program logo.

The Newark Museum Explorers Program is a year-round work-based, college-preparatory, and mentoring program that supports Newark high school students in their exploration of the sciences and humanities, and pursuit of a college education. The program is run from the Newark Museum in Newark, New Jersey, United States.

== History ==
In 1995, the Science Explorer's Program was the recipient of a start-up grant under the YouthAlive! Project, a national initiative, funded by the DeWitt Wallace Reader's Digest Fund in partnership with the Association of Science-Technology Centers (ASTC). The initiative called for the development of programs in museums that could provide positive work and learning opportunities for young people. The Star Ledger covered the program in 1998.

The Newark Museum Explorers Program is also a recipient of a grant provided by the Rivendell Foundation. In 2019, the program was recognized by Panasonic for its innovative curriculum.

== Meetings and workshops ==
Explorers meet regularly for workshops, meetings and training sessions prior to each festival. Workshops offered in the past includes public speaking workshops, bird-watching, financial literacy workshops, glass art workshops, etiquette workshops, animation workshops, mural painting, soap and candle making workshops.
