= Statue of Christopher Columbus (Newark, New Jersey) =

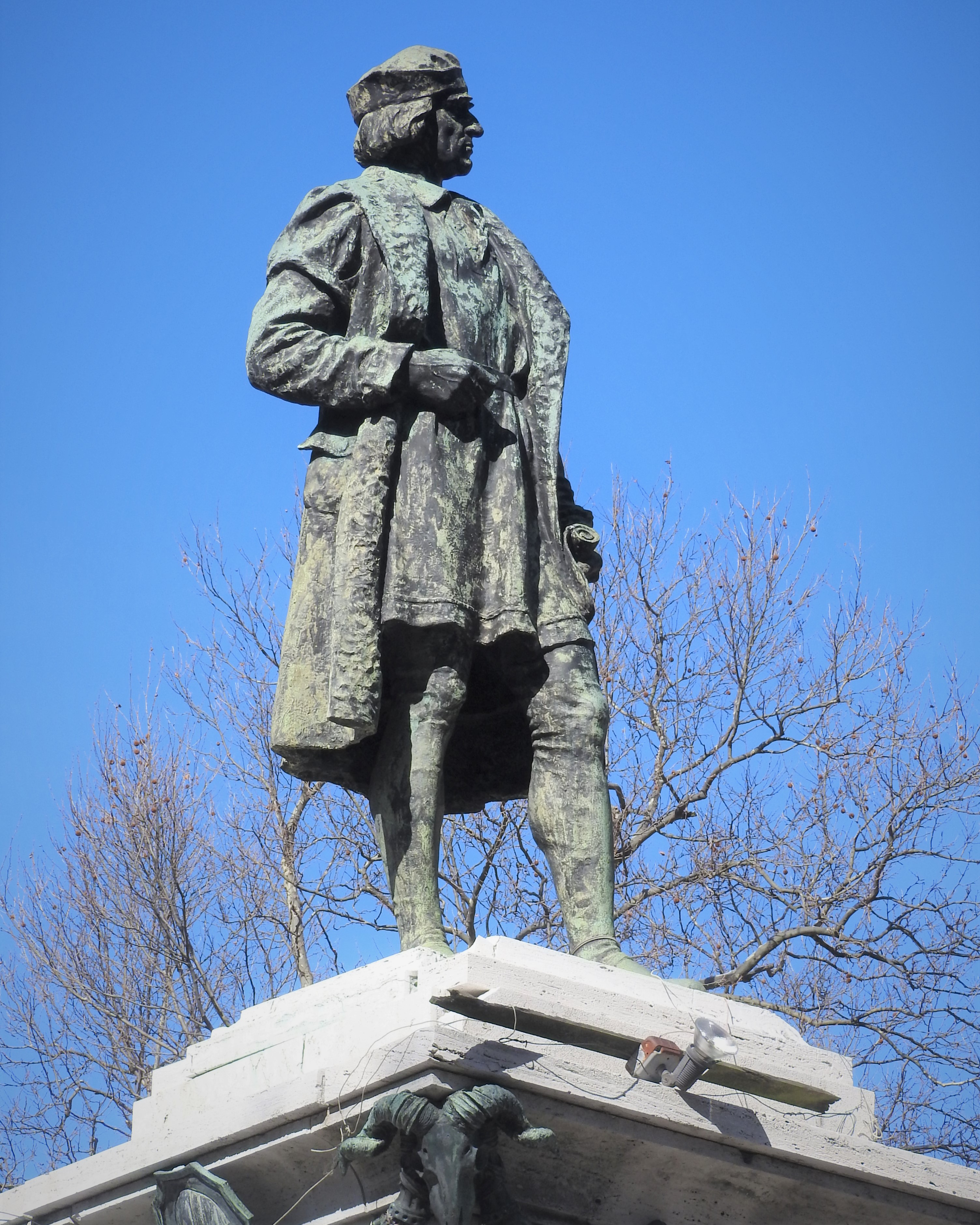
- The statue in March 2020
- Subject: Christopher Columbus
- Location: Newark, New Jersey, U.S.; 40°44′36.43″N 74°10′11.61″W

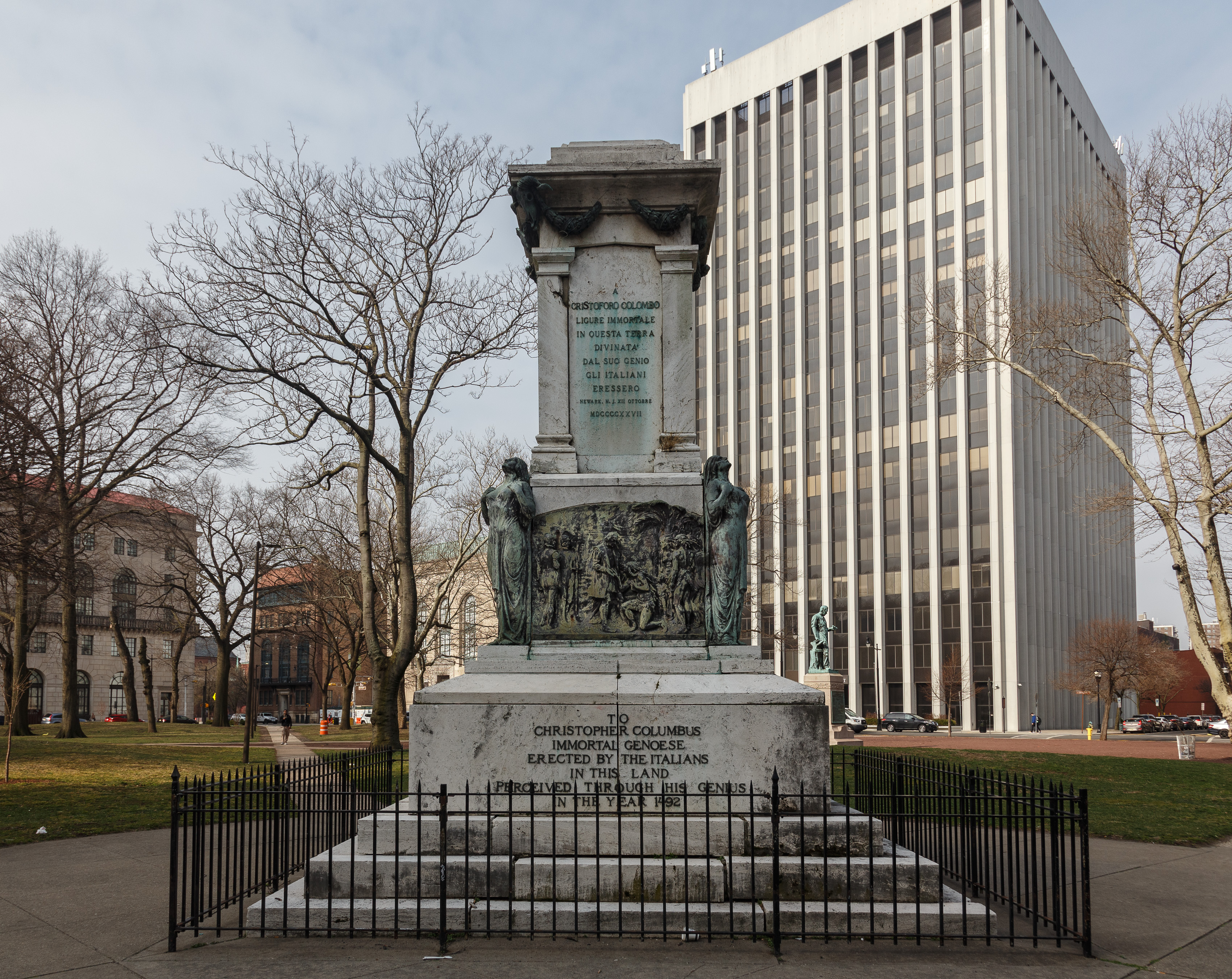
Base after statue removal

A statue of Christopher Columbus was a memorial in Washington Park (now Harriet Tubman Square) in Newark, New Jersey, within the James Street Commons Historic District. It was made in Rome by Giuseppe Ciochetti and presented to the city by Newark's Italian community in 1927. The statue was removed by the city (with pedestal left in place) in June 2020 to prevent its toppling in a Black Lives Matter protest.

The pedestal of the statue was removed in 2022 in preparation for the installation of A Shadow of a Face, a memorial to Harriet Tubman. The outline of the statue's plinth is inscribed on the ground as part of the new monument. Following its removal, the statue was stored for a time on a vacant city-owned lot in the North Ward before being moved to St. Lucy's Church. In April 2024, the city of Newark approved a Public Arts Loan of the statue to the church for a period of 20 years. At the time, the church intended to install it on a new plinth.

A second statue of Columbus in Newark, also ordered removed by Mayor Ras Baraka, was subsequently re-erected in Sussex County, New Jersey.

== See also ==
- List of monuments and memorials to Christopher Columbus
- List of monuments and memorials removed during the George Floyd protests
- List of public art in Newark, New Jersey
