= Atlantic Street station =

Atlantic Street Station
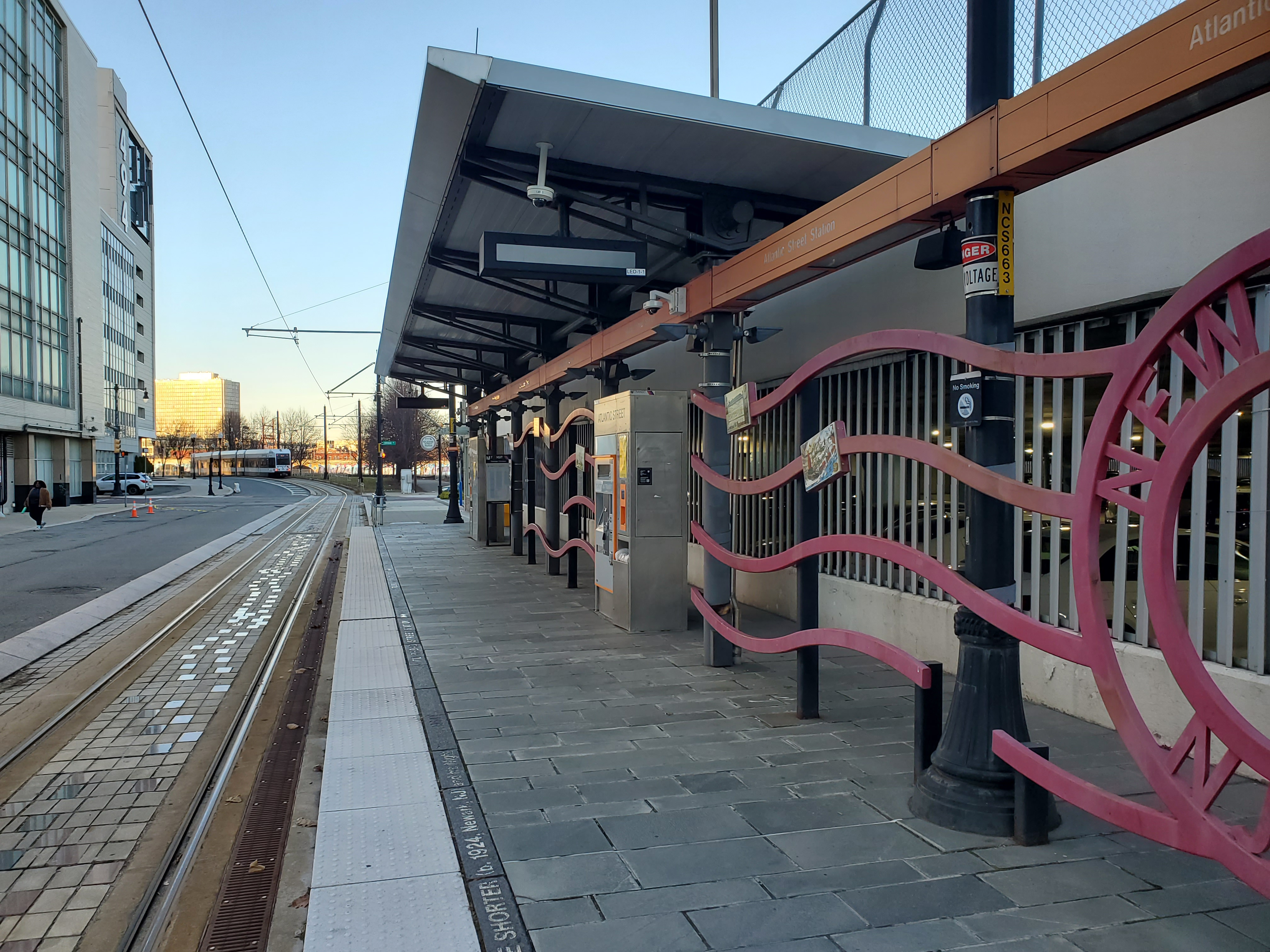
- Atlantic Street station in 2024

General information
- Location: Atlantic Street at Bridge Street; Newark, New Jersey
- Coordinates: 40.74384°N 74.16835°W
- Owner: New Jersey Transit
- Platforms: 1 side platform
- Tracks: 2
- Connections: NJ Transit Bus: 11, 13, 27, 28, go28, 29, 30, 41, 76, 378

Construction
- Structure type: At-grade
- Cycle facilities: Yes
- Accessible: Yes

Other information
- Fare zone: 1

History
- Opened: July 17, 2006

Passengers
- 2025: 14 (average weekday)
- Rank: 16 of 17

Services
Preceding station	NJ Transit	Following station
NJPAC/Center Street One-way operation	Broad Street – Newark Penn	Riverfront Stadium toward Newark Penn
Location

Atlantic Street station is a light rail station in Newark, New Jersey on the Newark Light Rail system. The station is located in Downtown Newark, next to Atlantic Street, between Bridge Street and Lombardy Street. It is only served by northbound trains; the nearby Harriet Tubman Square station is its southbound counterpart. The station opened on July 17, 2006, as part of the extension to Newark Broad Street station.
