= Riverfront Stadium station =

Riverfront Stadium
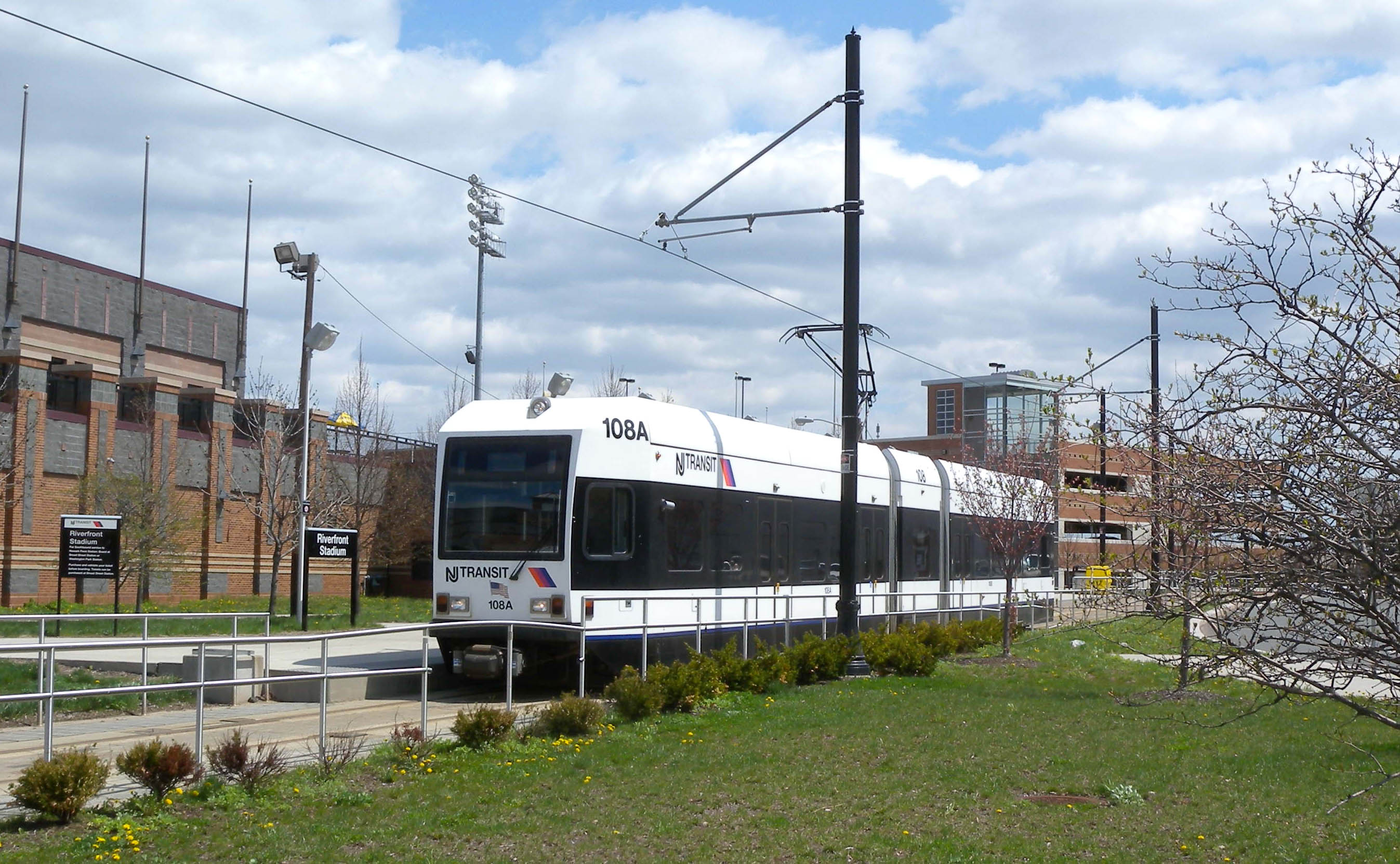
- Newark Light Rail car at Riverfront Stadium station in April 2009

General information
- Location: Atlantic Street and Broad Street; Newark, New Jersey
- Coordinates: 40°44′44″N 74°10′09″W
- Owner: New Jersey Transit
- Platforms: 1 side platform
- Tracks: 1
- Connections: NJ Transit Bus: 11, 13, 27, 28, go28, 29, 30, 41, 76, 378

Construction
- Structure type: At-grade
- Cycle facilities: Yes
- Accessible: Yes

Other information
- Station code: 30774
- Fare zone: 1

History
- Opened: July 17, 2006

Passengers
- 2025: 2 (average weekday)
- Rank: 17 of 17

Services
Preceding station	NJ Transit	Following station
Atlantic Street One-way operation	Broad Street – Newark Penn	Newark Broad Street toward Newark Penn
Location

Riverfront Stadium station is a light rail station in the Washington Park section of Newark, New Jersey, United States. The station is a single low-level platform for trains used by the Newark Light Rail branch to Newark Broad Street station. Riverfront Stadium station is a northbound-only stop, and the site of the former stadium is located across Broad Street from the terminus.

The station opened on July 17, 2006, when an extension from Newark Penn Station opened to Broad Street station. Riverfront Stadium station attained its name from the Bears & Eagles Riverfront Stadium, an independent baseball league ballpark. The station was located next to the entrance to Gate C; however, the stadium closed in 2013, and the city razed the stadium in 2019.
