= Indian and the Puritan =

- U.S. National Register of Historic Places
- New Jersey Register of Historic Places
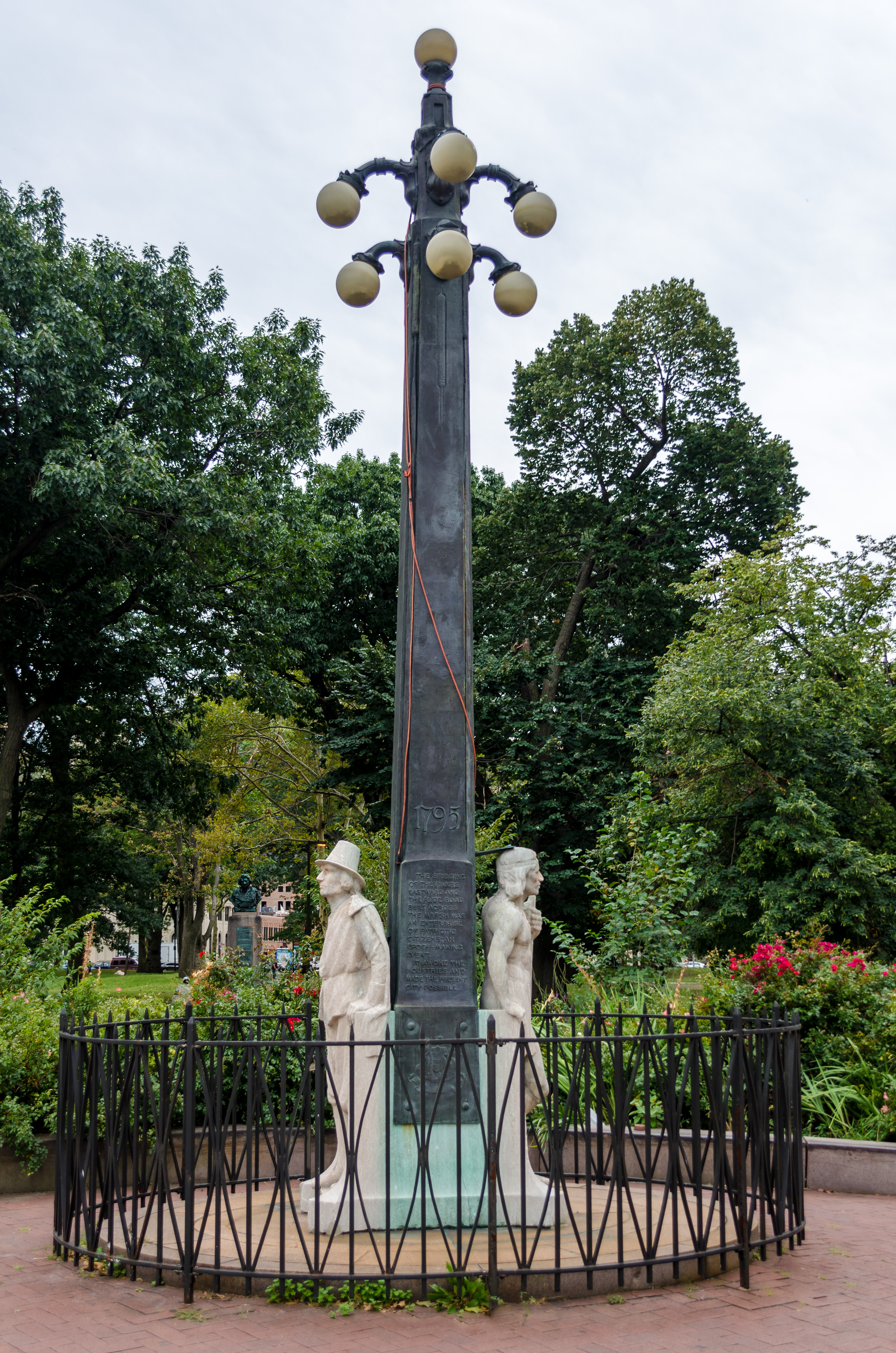

- Location within Essex County, New Jersey Location within New Jersey Location within the United States
- Location: Opposite 5 Washington Street(Newark Public Library), Newark, New Jersey
- Coordinates: 40°44′38″N 74°10′13″W
- Area: less than one acre
- Built: 1916
- Architect: Gutzon Borglum
- MPS: Public Sculpture in Newark MPS
- NRHP reference No.: 94001256
- NJRHP No.: 1273

Significant dates
- Added to NRHP: October 28, 1994
- Designated NJRHP: September 13, 1994

Indian and the Puritan is a 1916 marble and bronze monument by Gutzon Borglum, the sculptor of Mount Rushmore, opposite 5 Washington Street, the Newark Public Library, in Harriet Tubman Square (formerly Washington Park) of Newark in Essex County, New Jersey. It was added to the National Register of Historic Places on October 28, 1994, as part of the Public Sculpture in Newark, New Jersey Multiple Property Submission.

== History and description ==
The monument is a 22-foot (6.7 m) bronze lamp standard featuring two carved marble sculptures, a Native American and a Puritan. The lamp standard has Newark's city seal and two inscriptions that describe the city's history. The monument was commissioned by the city to commemorate its 250th anniversary, 1666–1916. It was moved to its current location in Washington Park in 1977.

Other sculptures by Borglum in Newark are: Seated Lincoln (1911), First Landing Party of the Founders of Newark (1916), and Wars of America (1926).

== See also ==
- List of public art in Newark, New Jersey
- National Register of Historic Places listings in Essex County, New Jersey
