= Harriet Tubman Square =

Square in Newark, New Jersey, US

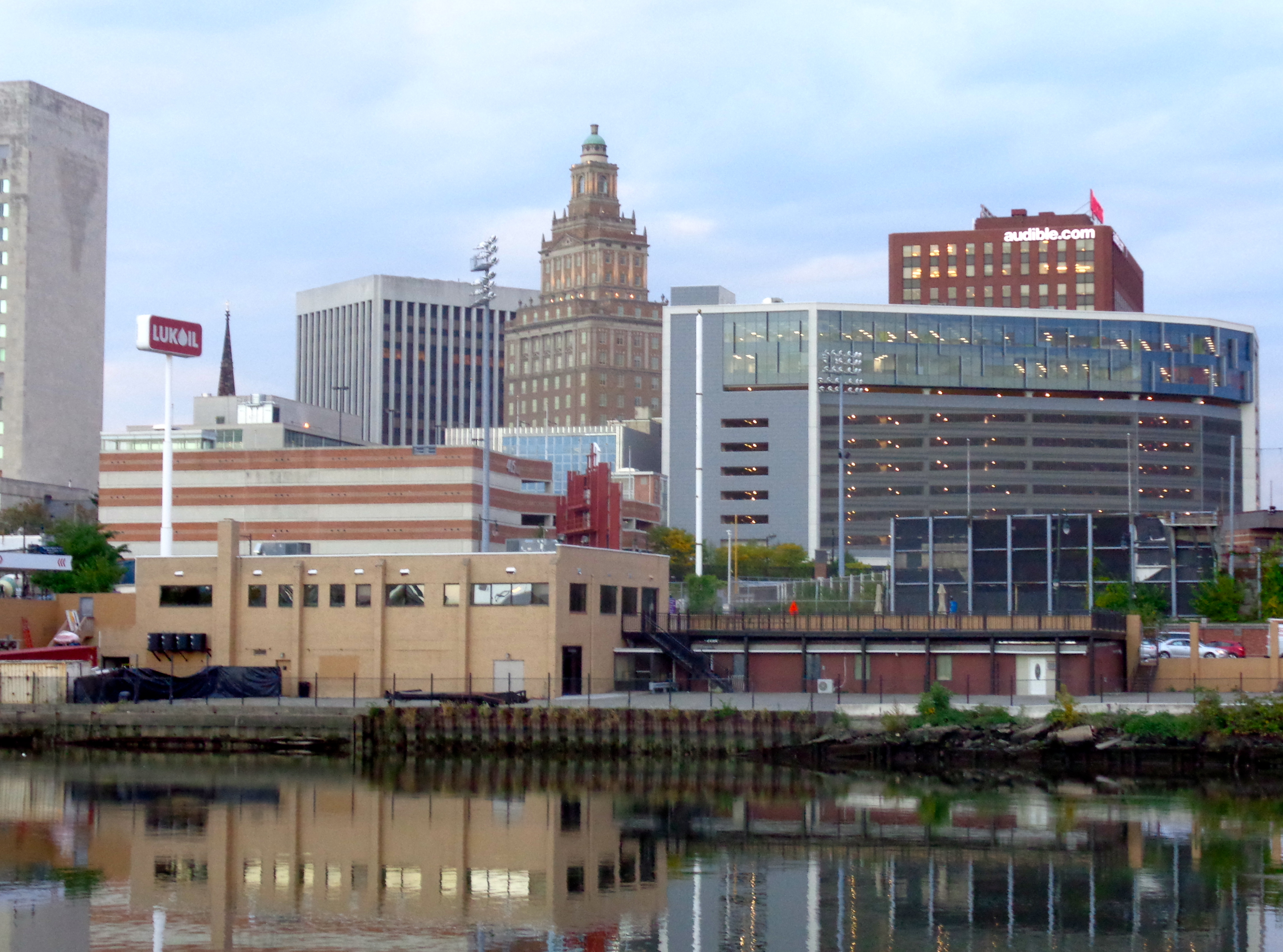
Skyline of Washington Park buildings such as IDT, North Reformed Church, 33 Washington St, American Insurance Company Building, Cablevision, 1 Washington Park, and Riverfront Stadium as seen from Passaic River in 2015

Harriet Tubman Square (formerly known as Washington Park) is a city square in Downtown Newark, New Jersey. It is the northernmost of the three colonial era downtown parks in the city, along with Lincoln Park and Military Park. The triangular park is bounded by Broad Street, Washington Street, and Washington Place at the end of Halsey Street. It is home to several public monuments and is surrounded by historic civic and commercial buildings. In a ceremony on Juneteenth 2022, the city re-named the park in honor of Harriet Tubman.

== District ==
- James Street Commons Historic District
- U.S. National Register of Historic Places
- U.S. Historic district – Contributing property
- New Jersey Register of Historic Places
- Location within Essex County, New Jersey Location within New Jersey Location within the United States
- Coordinates: 40.74459°N 74.17067°W
- NRHP reference No.: 78001758
- NJRHP No.: 1275

Significant dates
- Added to NRHP: January 9, 1978
- Designated NJRHP: February 10, 1977

Originally known as the North Common or the Upper Green, the park is a contributing property to the James Street Commons Historic District and is surrounded by notable landmarks. It forms the northern end of the city's central business district.

The North Reformed Church was built in 1857-59 without the use of ore, iron, or steel. The Ballantine House, a National Historic Landmark, was built by the brewer of Ballantine beer, John Ballantine, in 1885. It is part of the Newark Museum. The main Newark Public Library was built in 1903. Residential brownstones are found along James Street.

Among the office buildings located in the district are the American Insurance Company Building, One Washington Park, IDT Corporation, 550 Broad Street, 33 Washington Street, and the Cablevision Call Center. Several facilities of Rutgers-Newark and the headquarters of Audible are on the park.

== Statues ==
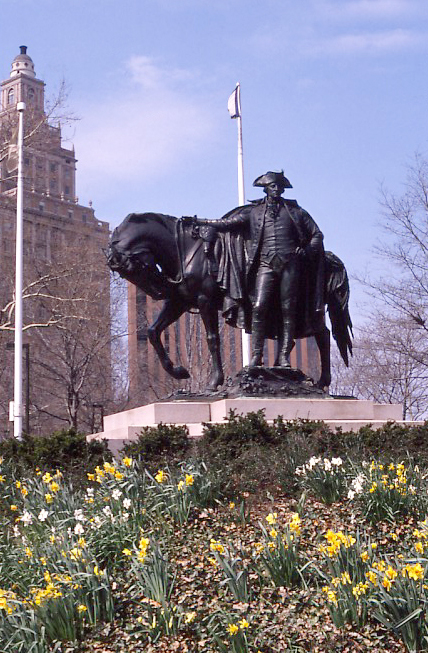
George Washington taking leave of troops at Rocky Hill.

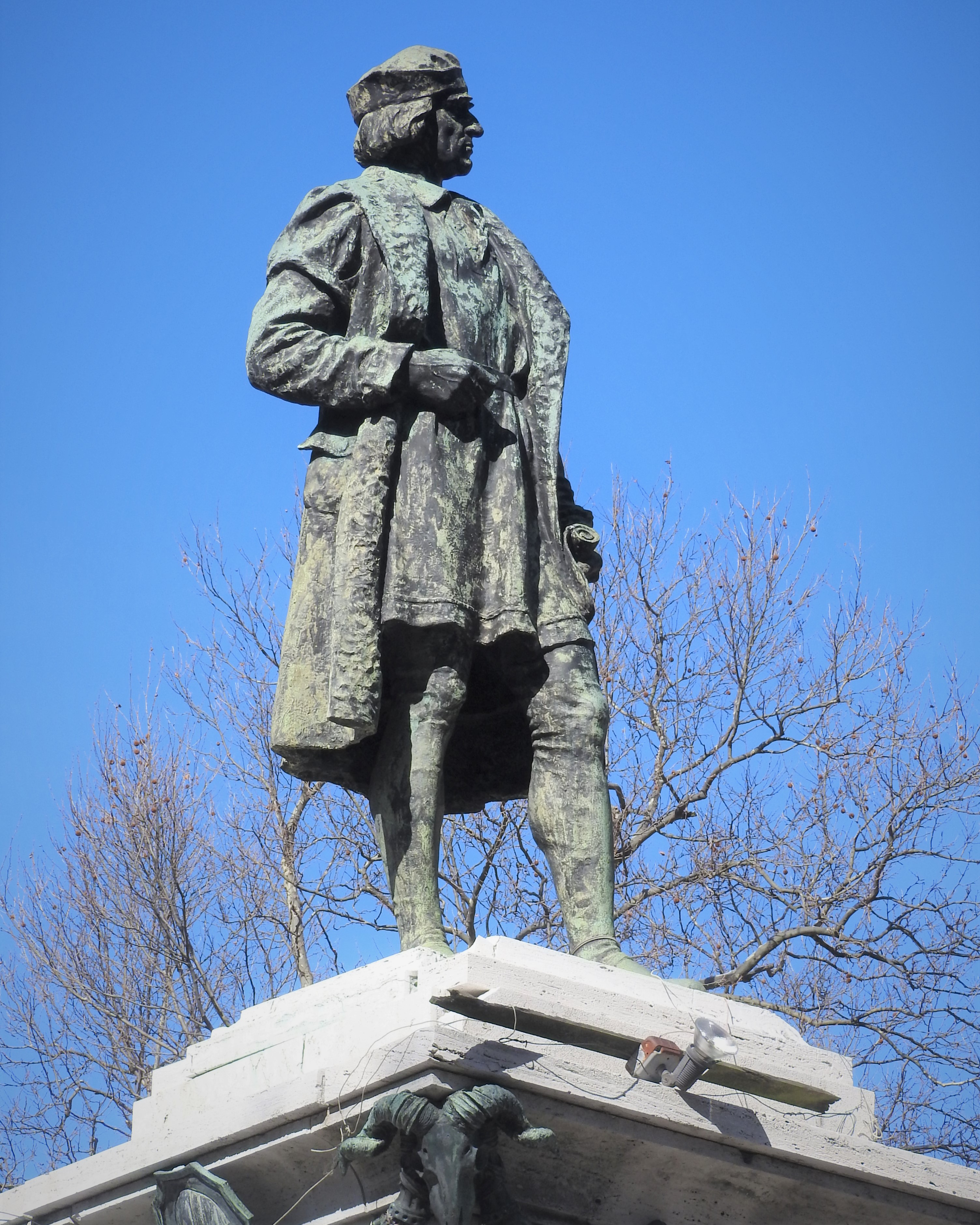
Christopher Columbus statue removed in June 2020

Several commemorative statues and tablets are in the park:

- Indian and the Puritan (1916), one of four public worksby sculptor Gutzon Borglum in Newark.
- George Washington (1912), an A J. Massey Rhind work, depicts the general taking leave from his troops at Rockingham.
- A statue of Christopher Columbus was made in Rome by Giuseppe Ciochetti and presented to the city by Newark's Italians in 1927. It was removed by the city (with pedestal left in place) in June 2020 to prevent its possible toppling in a Black Lives Matter protest. The plinth was removed in 2022. The statue was in a vacant city lot, as of October 2020.
- A work by Karl Gerhardt of Seth Boyden, who was one of Newark's leading citizens, captain of industry in the 19th century, an inventor of patent leather and innovation for train locomotives.
- Shadow of a Face by Nina Cooke John is a memorial to Harriet Tubman installed in 2023. It replaced the monument to Columbus.

== Wednesdays at Washington Park ==
Since 2009, a weekly green market and outdoor concert is held at the park from June to October.

== Transportation ==
The Newark Light Rail Washington Park station lies along the Broad Street side of the park. Riverfront Stadium station is a block away. The Newark Broad Street Station, served by New Jersey Transit (NJT), is two blocks north. Numerous buses serve Newark and environs, including Newark Liberty International Airport.

== See also ==
- List of public art in Newark, New Jersey
- Harriet Tubman National Historical Park
- Mulberry Commons
- National Register of Historic Places listings in Essex County, New Jersey
- List of tallest buildings in Newark
- List of monuments dedicated to George Washington
