= The Newark Museum of Art =

Art museum in New Jersey, United States

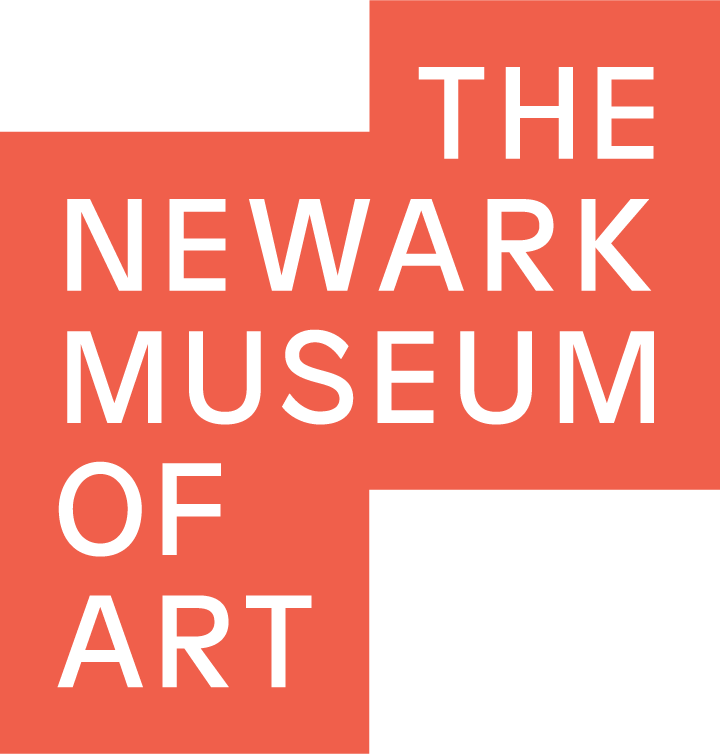

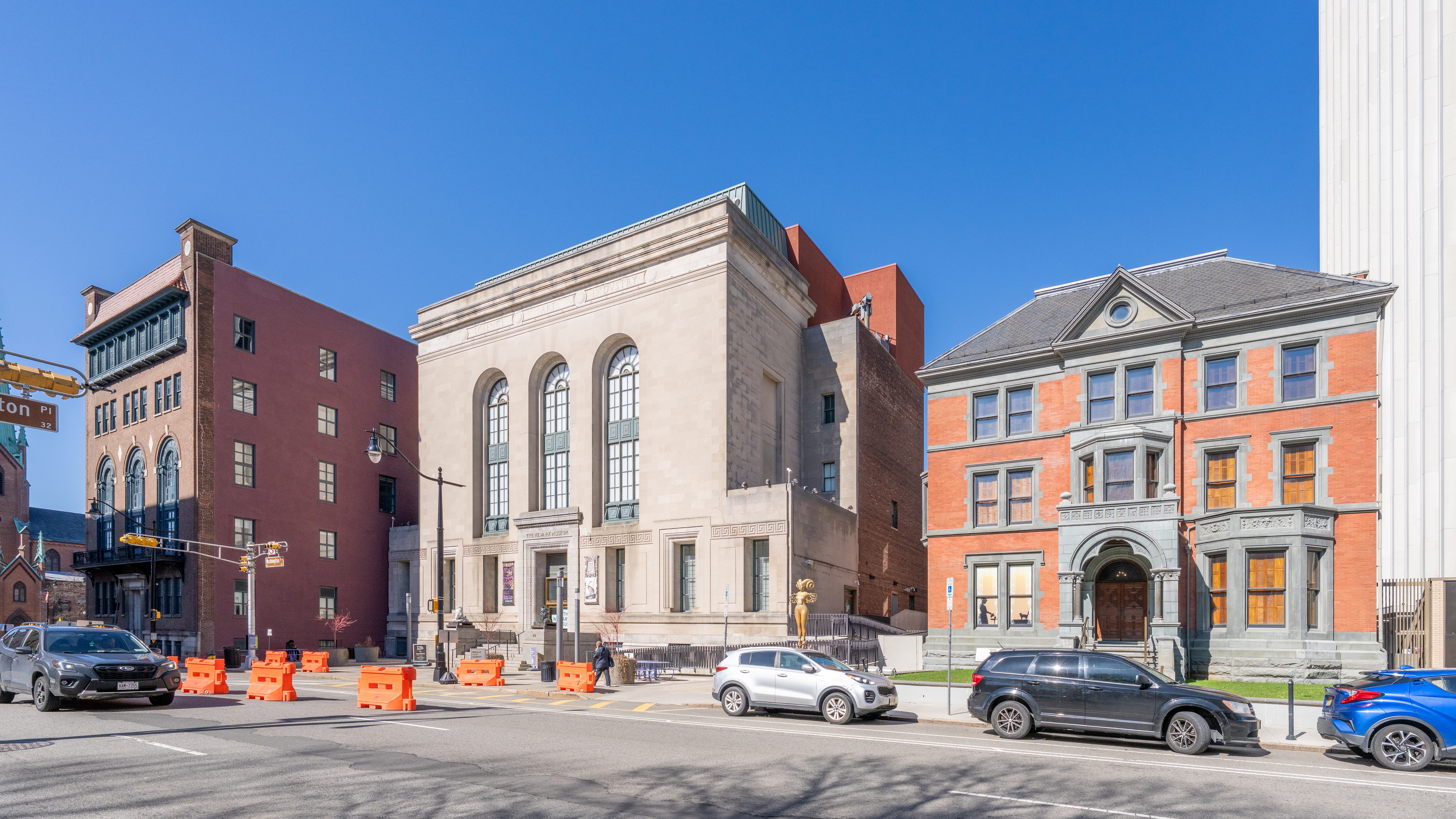
- The Newark Museum of Art seen from Washington Park
- Interactive fullscreen map
- Established: 1909
- Location: 49 Washington St; Newark, New Jersey, U.S.
- Coordinates: 40°44′34″N 74°10′18″W
- Director: Linda C. Harrison
- Public transit access: Washington Park Station (Newark Light Rail)
- Website: newarkmuseumart.org
- James Street Commons Historic District
- U.S. National Register of Historic Places
- U.S. Historic district – Contributing property
- New Jersey Register of Historic Places
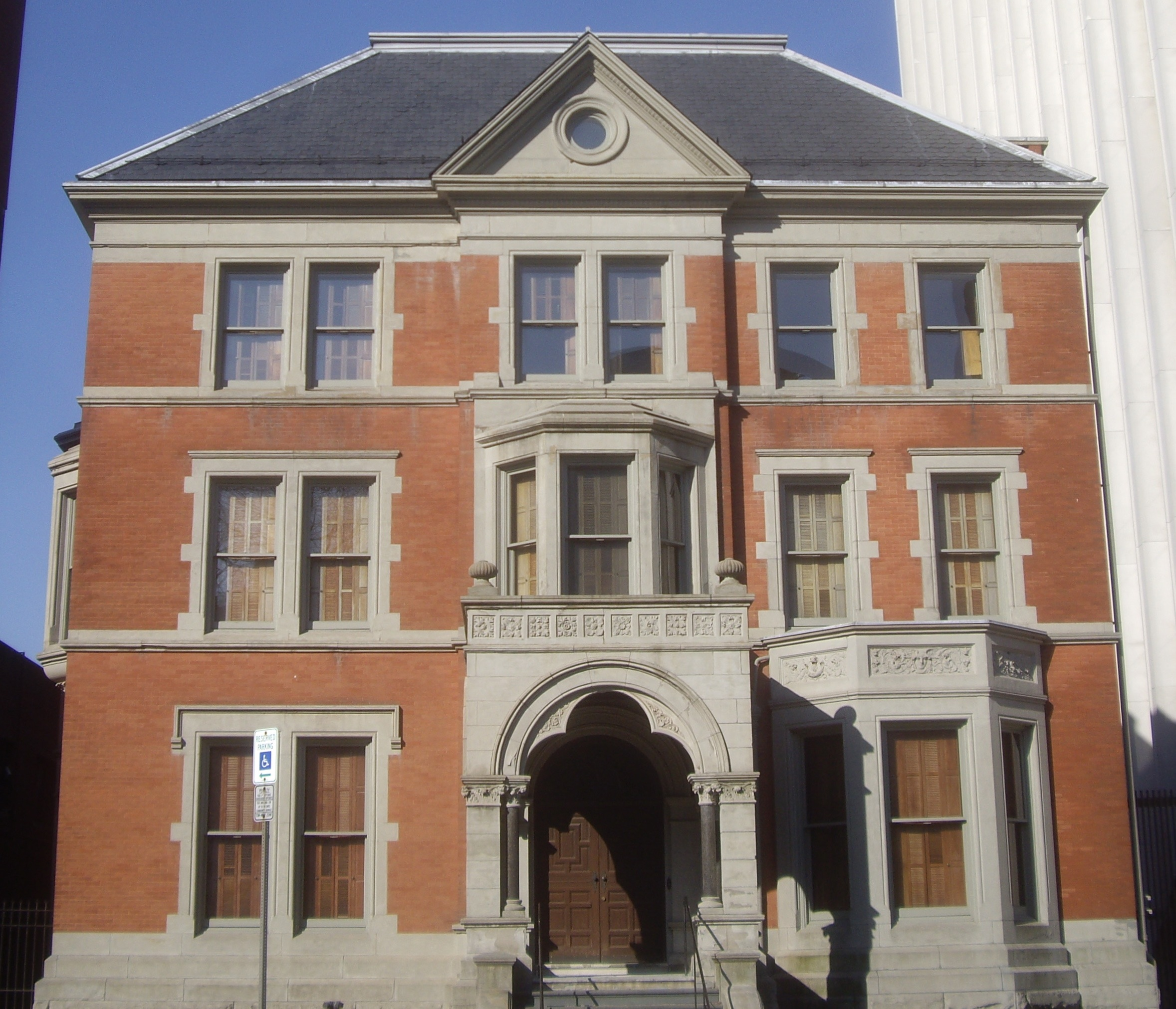
- John Ballantine House

- Location within Essex County, New Jersey Location within New Jersey Location within the United States
- NRHP reference No.: 78001758
- NJRHP No.: 1275

Significant dates
- Added to NRHP: January 9, 1978
- Designated NJRHP: February 10, 1977

The Newark Museum of Art, formerly known as the Newark Museum, in Newark, New Jersey is the state's largest museum. It holds major collections of American art, decorative arts, contemporary art, and arts of Asia (including a large collection of Tibetan art), Africa, the Americas, and the ancient world. Its extensive collections of American art include works by Hiram Powers, Thomas Cole, John Singer Sargent, Albert Bierstadt, Frederick Church, Childe Hassam, Mary Cassatt, Edward Hopper, Georgia O'Keeffe, Joseph Stella, Tony Smith, and Frank Stella.

In addition to its extensive art collections, The Newark Museum of Art is dedicated to natural science. It includes the Dreyfuss Planetarium and the Victoria Hall of Science, which highlights selections from the museum's 70,000 specimen Natural Science Collection. The Alice Ransom Dreyfuss Memorial Garden, located behind the museum, houses numerous works of contemporary sculpture and is the setting for community programs, concerts and performances. The garden is home to a 1784 old stone schoolhouse and the Newark Fire Museum.

The museum was founded in 1909 by librarian and reformer John Cotton Dana. The charter said that the purpose was "to establish in the City of Newark, New Jersey, a museum for the reception and exhibition of articles of art, science, history and technology, and for the encouragement of the study of the arts and sciences." The kernel or focus of the museum was a collection of Japanese prints, silks, and porcelains assembled by a Newark pharmacist.

Originally located on the fourth floor of the Newark Public Library, the museum moved into its own purpose-built structure in the 1920s on Washington Park after a gift by Louis Bamberger. It was designed by Jarvis Hunt, who also designed Bamberger's flagship Newark store. Since then, the museum has expanded several times, to the south into the red brick former YMCA and to the north into the 1885 Ballantine House, by a four-year, $23 million renovation. In 1990, the museum expanded to the west into an existing acquired building. At that time much of the museum including the new addition, was redesigned by Michael Graves.

The museum had a mini-zoo with small animals until 2010. The Mini Zoo was open from the 1920s to 1986 and 1988-2010 and in 1974 included an alligator.

For the security of climate-sensitive artwork, the museum closed its front entrance to the public in 1997 to minimize the effects of temperature and humidity changes. In February 2018, after extensive renovation and the construction of a ramp for disabled access, the front doors were reopened.

On November 6, 2019, the museum changed its name to "The Newark Museum of Art" to highlight the focus of the museum on its art collection, which was ranked 12th in the country. The Newark Black Film Festival was founded in conjunction with the museum and was formerly held every summer on the museum campus. The museum is open Thursdays and Fridays from 12 to 7pm, and Saturdays and Sundays from 10am to 5pm. On the third Friday of each month, the museum is open late until 9pm.

== Tibetan collections ==
The museum's Tibetan art galleries are considered among the best in the world. The collection was purchased from Christian missionaries in the early twentieth century. The Tibetan galleries have an in-situ Buddhist altar that the Dalai Lama has consecrated.

In 1910, Albert L. Shelton, a missionary to Tibet, agreed to lend his collection of Tibetan art to Edward N. Crane, a Newark Museum trustee, for a temporary exhibition at the museum. The exhibition, the first dedicated Tibetan art exhibition in the world, ran in 1911 with a success. Crane died in the same year. His wife and brother bought the collection from Shelton and donated it to the museum to create a permanent collection in Crane's memory. The museum also commissioned Shelton to bring back more artifacts to add to its collection between 1913 and 1920.

Before the year 1935, the Tibetan art artifacts were presented individually, accompanied by respective descriptions, employing a format consistent with that observed in various art collections. This mode of presentation shared similarities with practices observed in other museums housing Tibetan collections such as the Victoria and Albert Museum and the British Museum in London. In 1935, the Newark Museum constructed a temporary altar to provide a meaningful setting for its collection. The altar was very well received by the visitors and the decision was made to keep as a permanent setting. Subsequently, Tibetan monks and other dignitaries visited the museum and had sanctified the altar space.

The museum continued to acquire more objects to its collection until the 1940s, when its collection included more than 5,000 objects including paintings, sculptures, ritual objects, fine textiles and decorative arts.

In the mid-1980s, the "Tibet, the Living Tradition" project at the museum involved a renovation and expansion to have the installation of eight permanent galleries. The original altar was de-consecration by the Venerable Ganden Tri Rinpoche in January 1988. It was retained to be enclosed in the cavity of the new altar. The new altar was created by Tibetan artist-in-residence, Phuntsok Dorje, between 1989 and 1990. The new altar was consecrated by the 14th Dalai Lama in 1990. As of 2019, the museum housed over 5,500 Tibetan art artifacts establishing as the largest and most distinctive collection in the Western Hemisphere.

In addition to the Tibetan art, the museum houses a significant depository of historical photographs and films of Tibet. There are more than 2,500 images taken between 1904 and 1949, and hours of film footage between 1935 and 1937 in its collection.

== The Ballantine House ==
The Ballantine house is a preserved and restored house from the Victorian Era, designed by architect George Edward Harney. It was home to John Holme Ballantine, his wife, Jeannette, and their children, John, Robert, Alice, and Percy. Mr. Ballantine owned and ran a brewery in the Ironbound section of Newark. The house originally had twenty-seven rooms and three floors. In 1937, the Newark Museum bought the house and has since restored it to serve as galleries for the extensive decorative arts collections.

== See also ==
- Explorers Program at Newark Museum
