= Harriet Tubman Square station =

Harriet Tubman Square Station
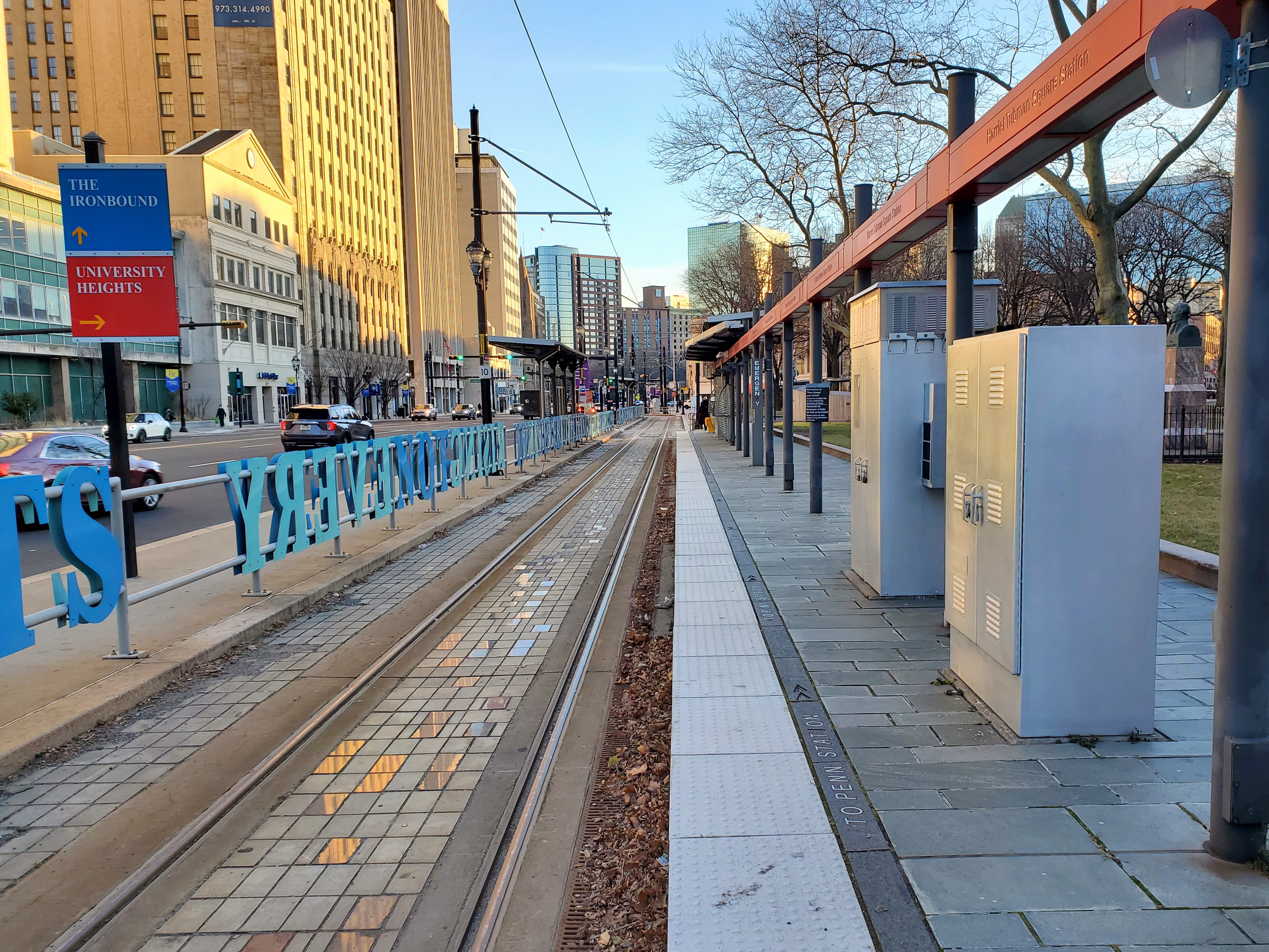
- Harriet Tubman Square station in 2024

General information
- Location: Broad Street and Bridge Street; Newark, New Jersey
- Coordinates: 40°44′37.95″N 74°10′12.27″W
- Owner: New Jersey Transit
- Platforms: 1 side platform
- Tracks: 1
- Connections: NJ Transit Bus: 1, 11, 13, 27, 28, go28, 29, 30, 41, 59, 76, 378

Construction
- Structure type: At-grade
- Cycle facilities: Yes
- Accessible: Yes

Other information
- Fare zone: 1

History
- Opened: July 17, 2006
- Former names: Washington Park

Passengers
- 2025: 212 (average weekday)
- Rank: 14 of 17

Services
Preceding station	NJ Transit	Following station
NJPAC/Center Street toward Broad Street	Broad Street – Newark Penn	Broad Street One-way operation
Location

Harriet Tubman Square station (formerly Washington Park) is a light rail station on the Newark Light Rail system. It is located in Downtown Newark, New Jersey, United States, on the southbound side of Broad Street between Bridge and Lombardy Streets adjacent to Harriet Tubman Square. The station is only served by southbound trains; the nearby Atlantic Street station is its northbound counterpart. It opened on July 17, 2006, as part of the extension to Newark Broad Street station.

The station also features two installations of public art by Willie Cole, a native Newarker and African American conceptual and visual artist.
