= Morris County Courthouse (New Jersey) =

- U.S. National Register of Historic Places
- U.S. Historic district – Contributing property
- New Jersey Register of Historic Places
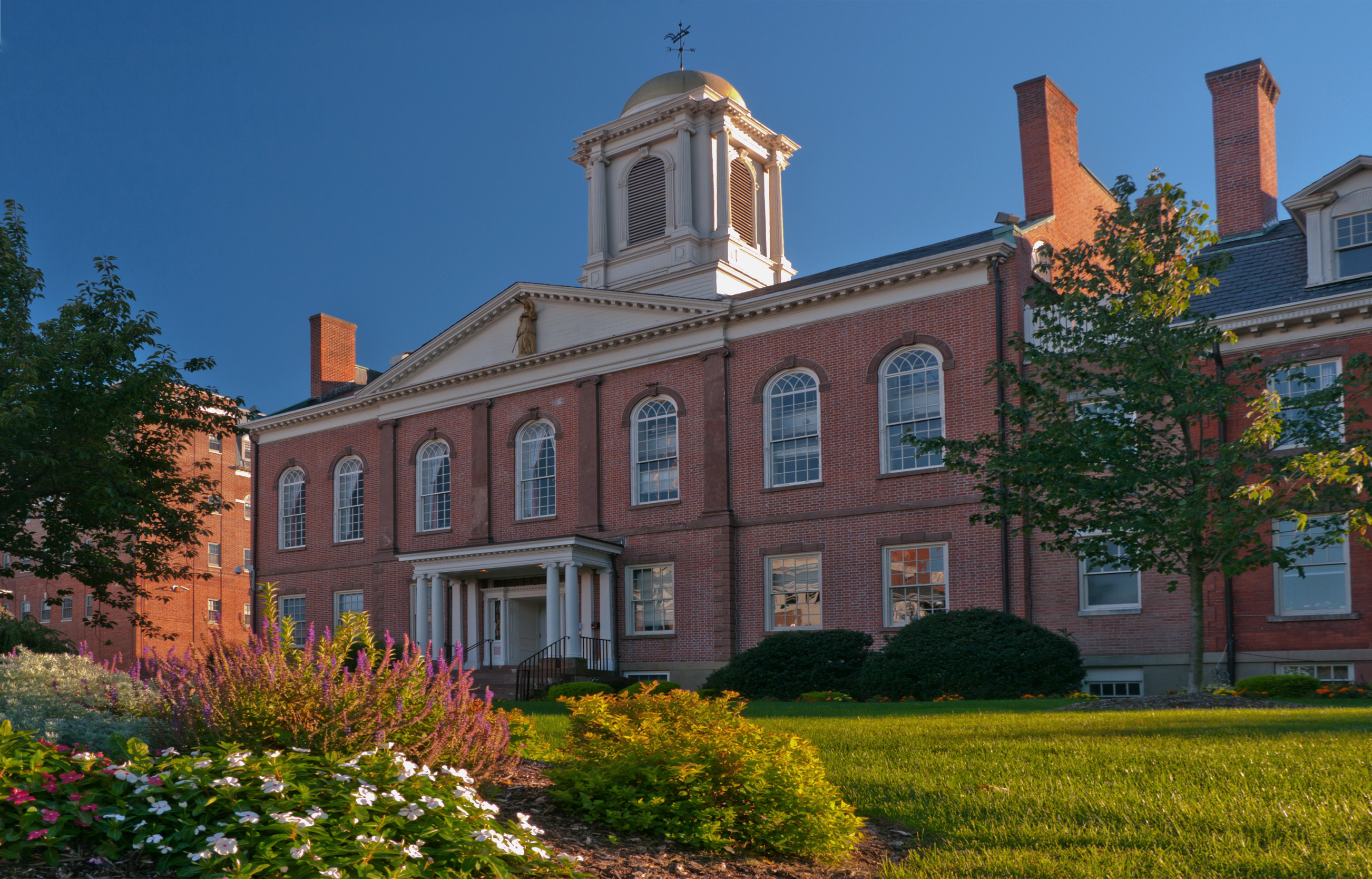

- Location within Morris County, New Jersey Location within New Jersey Location within the United States
- Location: Washington Street between Court Street and Western Avenue; Morristown, New Jersey
- Coordinates: 40°47′51″N 74°29′5″W
- Area: 1.2 acres (0.49 ha)
- Built: 1827
- Built by: Joseph M. Lindsley
- Architect: Lewis Carter
- Architectural style: Greek Revival, Federal
- Part of: Morristown Historic District (ID86003109)
- NRHP reference No.: 77000898
- NJRHP No.: 2190

Significant dates
- Added to NRHP: August 19, 1977
- Designated CP: November 13, 1986
- Designated NJRHP: March 11, 1977

Morris County Courthouse is located on Washington Street between Court Street and Western Avenue in the town of Morristown in Morris County, New Jersey. The courthouse was built in 1827 and was added to the National Register of Historic Places on August 19, 1977, for its significance in architecture and politics/government. It was added as a contributing property of the Morristown Historic District on November 13, 1986.

== History and description ==
The first courthouse for the county was built in 1755 in the Morristown Green. The second one was built in 1770, also in the Green. In 1826, the county decided to build a third courthouse, located on Washington Street. It was designed by architect Lewis Carter featuring both Greek Revival and Federal architecture. The three-story building was completed in 1827 by contractor Joseph M. Lindsley using brick with brownstone trim.

== See also ==
- County courthouses in New Jersey
- Richard J. Hughes Justice Complex
- National Register of Historic Places listings in Morris County, New Jersey
- Federal courthouses in New Jersey
