= Frank R. Lautenberg Post Office and Courthouse =

Building in Newark, New Jersey, US

Coordinates: 40.7306°N 74.1730°W

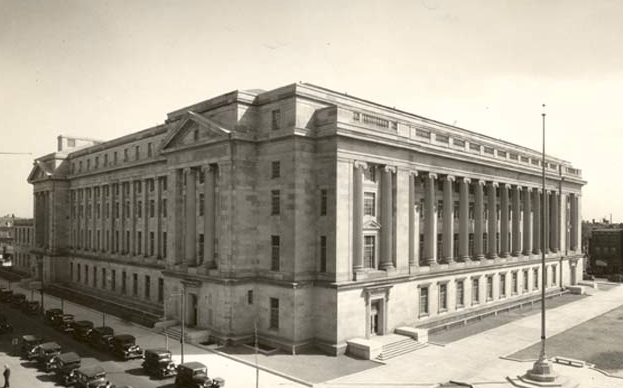
U.S. Post Office and Courthouse at Federal Square, 1936

The Frank R. Lautenberg Post Office and Courthouse is United States Post Office and courthouse of the United States District Court for the District of New Jersey located at Government Center in Downtown Newark, Essex County, New Jersey. The building's cornerstone was laid in 1933 and the building was completed as a New Deal project in 1935. The building was named for U.S. Senator Frank Lautenberg by an act of Congress in 2000.

== See also ==
- Martin Luther King Building and United States Courthouse
- List of United States federal courthouses in New Jersey
- County courthouses in New Jersey
- Richard J. Hughes Justice Complex
