= Mercer County Courthouse (New Jersey) =

Court building in Trenton, New Jersey

The courthouses of Mercer County are located in Trenton, the county seat, and capital of New Jersey, United States. They are home to the 7th vicinage of the New Jersey Superior Court as well as numerous county offices.

Trenton is also the site Clarkson S. Fisher Federal Building and United States Courthouse which serves the United States District Court for the District of New Jersey and the Richard J. Hughes Justice Complex, home to the Supreme Court of New Jersey.

Mercer County was formed in 1838 and soon after saw the erection of a Greek Revival courthouse at the corner of Broad and Market Streets, which served until 1903.

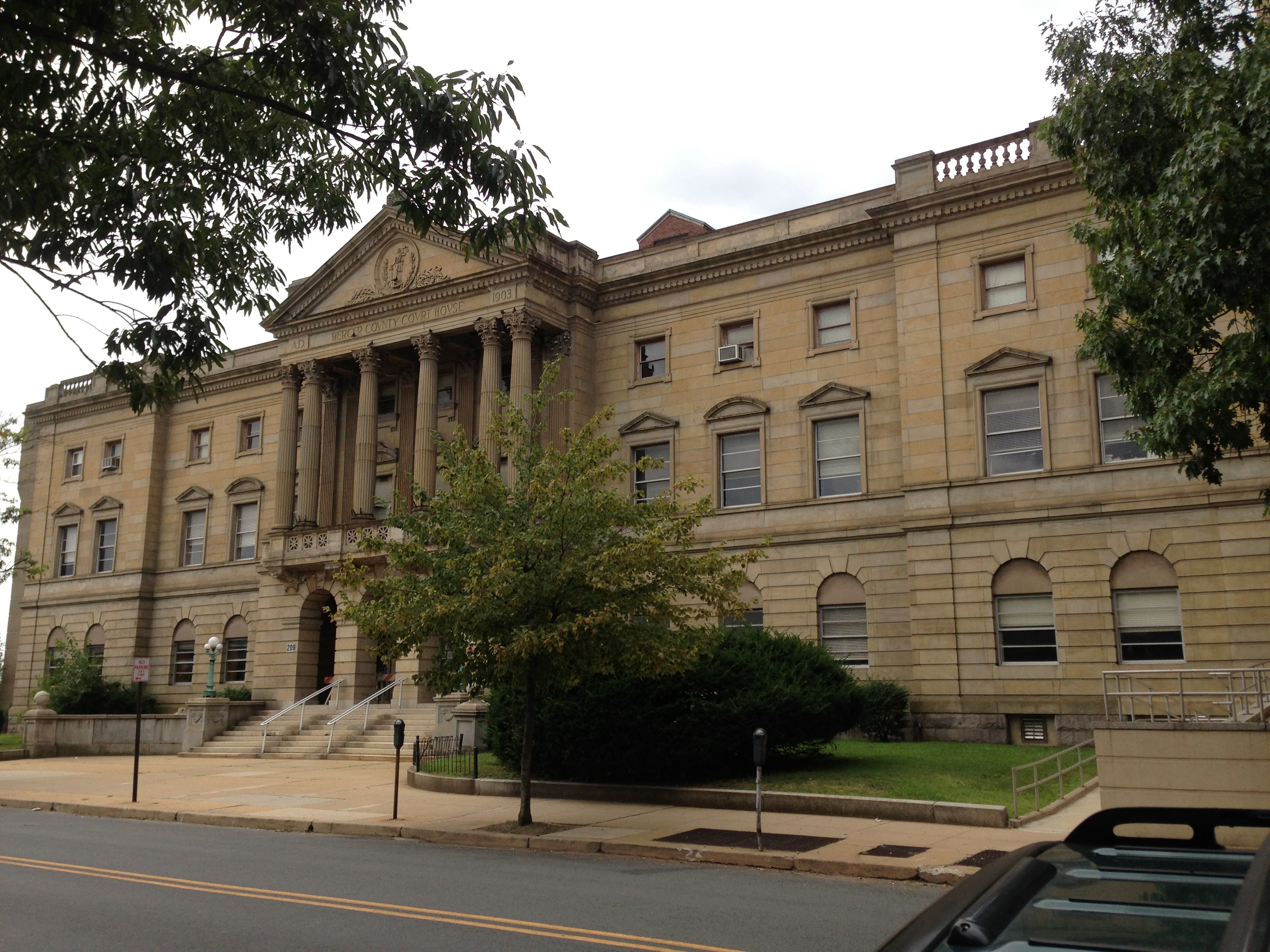
Old Mercer County Courthouse on South Broad

The historic Mercer County Courthouse is located at 209 South Broad Street. The classical Beaux Arts building was designed by William Slack. The cornerstone was laid May 14, 1902. The Mercer County Courthouse Annex at 205-207 South Broad Street was designed by Louis S. Kaplan and built in 1939. In 2010 the state historic preservation office issued a COE (certificate of eligibility) for the courthouse and its annex for inclusion on the in 1990 New Jersey and National Register of Historic Places (#4996). They abut the Mill Hill Historic District at South Broad Street. The buildings house the county's prosecutor's office, county clerk and board of elections.

The Mercer County Criminal Courthouse at 400 South Warren Street opened on January 14, 2013,is behind and adjacent to the older building. The four-story 142,000-square-foot building meets LEED standards. It has nine courtrooms and associated judges' chambers and administrative offices. The lower level houses sheriff offices and other facilities.

The Mercer County Civil Courthouse at 175 South Broad Street was built circa 2007. It designed by Trenton architectural firm Clarke Caton Hintz to invoke a 19th Century civic building. The four-story 158,000-square-foot building contains 14 courtroom and houses the Civil, Special Civil, Equity and Family courts.

== See also ==
- Courts of New Jersey
- County courthouses in New Jersey
- Federal courthouses in New Jersey
