= Camden County Hall of Justice =

County courthouse in New Jersey, US

Coordinates: 39°56′35″N 75°07′21″W

The Camden County Hall of Justice is the county courthouse for Camden County, New Jersey, located in the county seat, the City of Camden. It in the 4th vicinage for the New Jersey Superior Court.

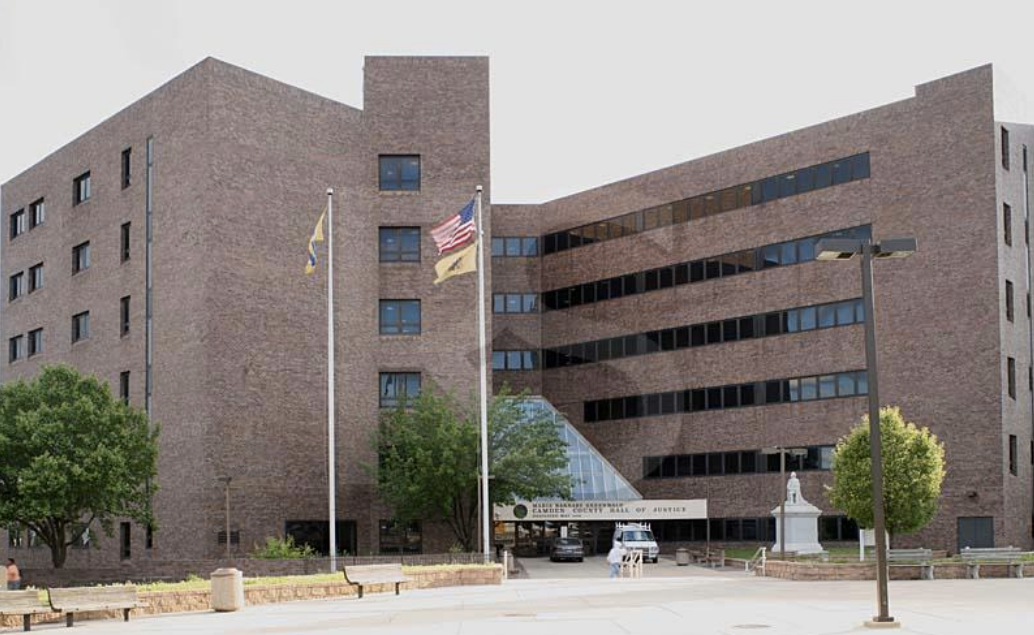

The complex was built in 1982 and was dedicated to Maria Barnaby Greenwald, the first woman surrogate in the county, in 1996.

== Earlier courthouses ==
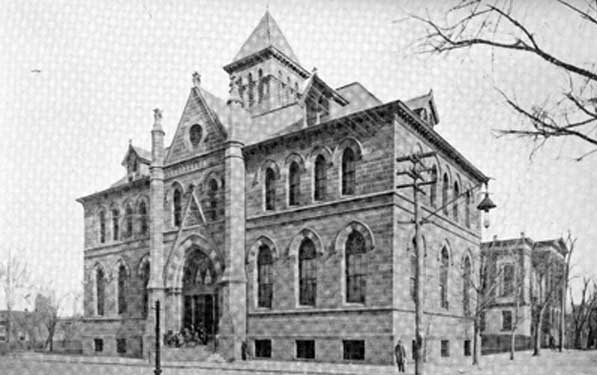
1870s-1904

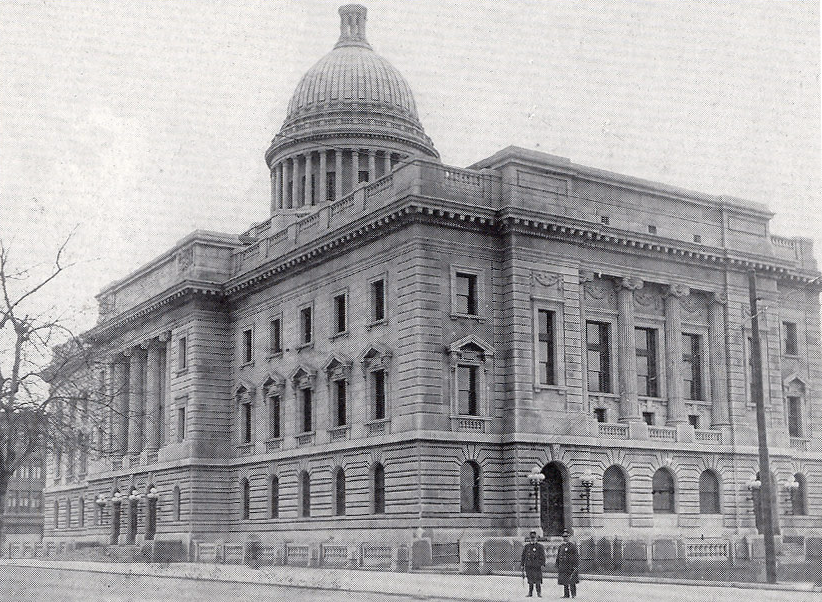
1906-1950s

Camden County was formed on March 13, 1844, from portions of Gloucester County. The first courthouse, designed Samuel Sloan was completed circa 1853. A new building was built circa 1879 and demolished around 1904 to make way for the new one. which replaced it. That neo-classical courthouse and was demolished in the 1950s. At the time many county offices moved to Camden City Hall, where they remained into the 21st century.

== Federal courthouse ==
Also located in Camden is the United States Post Office and Courthouse and its annex.

== See also ==
- County courthouses in New Jersey
- Federal courthouses in New Jersey
- Richard J. Hughes Justice Complex
- Courts of New Jersey
- List of the oldest courthouses in the United States
