= Frank J. Guarini Justice Complex =

Courthouse complex in Jersey City

- (2026)
- Interactive map of the Frank J. Guarini Justice Complex area

General information
- Status: Completed
- Location: Jersey City, NJ, United States, 24 Central Ave., Jersey City, NJ
- Coordinates: 40.733°N 74.057°W
- Named for: Frank J. Guarini
- Groundbreaking: 24 January 2021
- Topped-out: 9 September 2022
- Estimated completion: October 2024
- Opened: June 6, 2026
- Cost: 345 million USD
- Owner: Hudson County Improvement Authority

Technical details
- Size: 405,000 sqft

Design and construction
- Architect: Rafael Viñoly
- Architecture firm: Netta Architects
- Structural engineer: O'Donnell & Naccarato
- Main contractor: Terminal Construction Corporation

Other information
- Parking: 471-space garage

Website
- hudsoncountycourthouse.com

The Frank J. Guarini Justice Complex is a judicial complex in Jersey City, New Jersey, that opened in 2026. The complex comprises a five-story building, a one-and-a-half-story building, and a six-story parking garage, that replaces the Hudson County Administration Building, which was built in 1957. The complex is named after New Jersey Democratic politician Frank J. Guarini.

== Design ==
The complex shares a single foundation and includes three buildings: a five-story offices and courthouses, a one-and-half story building for Surrogate court, and a six-story, 471-space parking garage. The parking garage has shorter floors than the main building, allowing the five-story courthouse to overhang the six-story garage. A three-story ramp connects the lobby with the main courthouse, providing access while avoiding the higher security lower levels. The complex features a 75-seat cafeteria, a self-help law library, a children’s play area and staff training spaces.

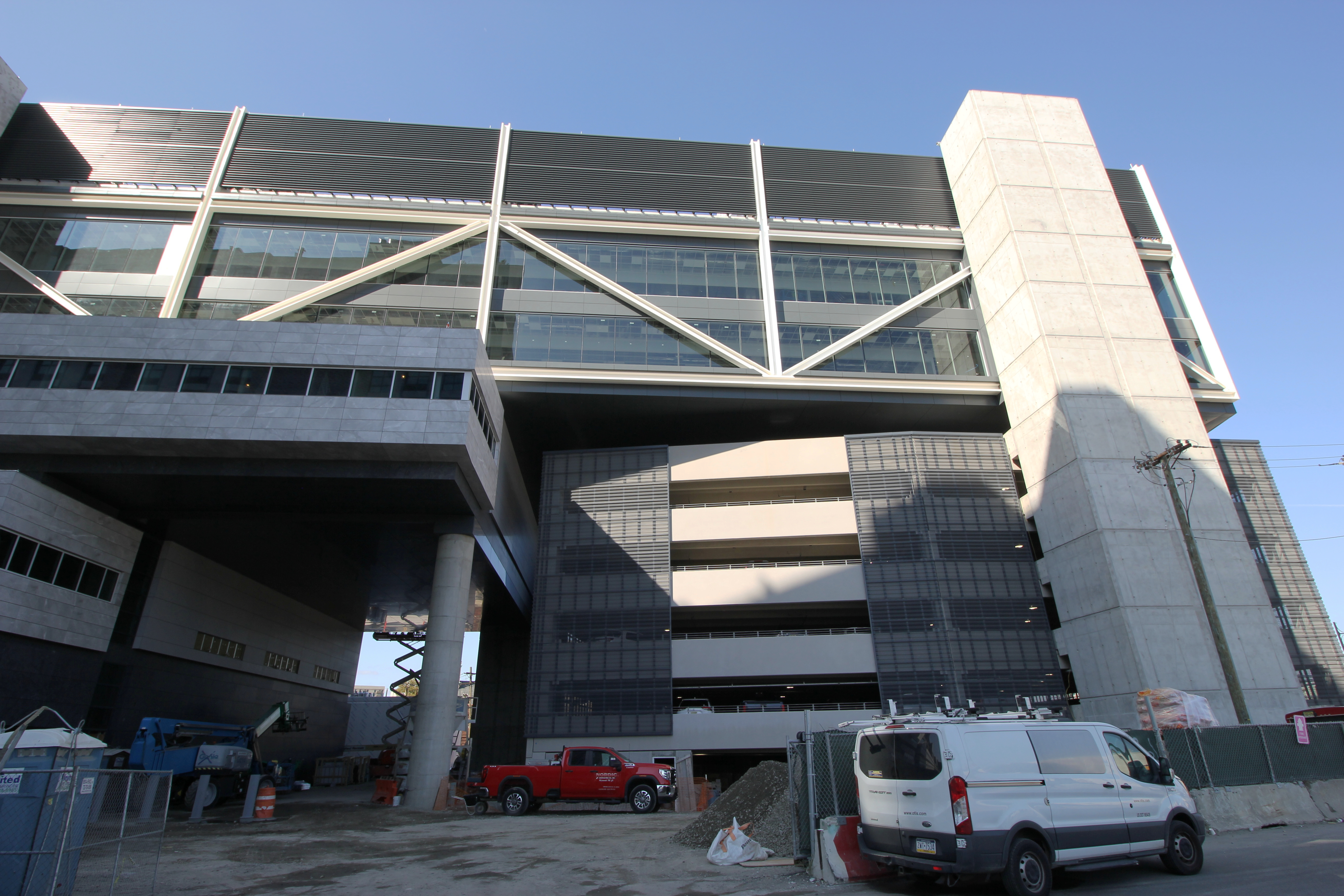
The eastern side of the complex, showing the parking garage and admin floors above

== Security ==
The building has several structural safety features, including ballistic rated windows and protection from a total collapse due to an explosion. The new complex also seeks to address security issues that the previous building had, including separate entrances for the public, staff, and inmates, as well as having areas with differing levels of security based on their function.

== See also ==
- County courthouses in New Jersey
- Federal courthouses in New Jersey
