= Union County Courthouse (New Jersey) =

Coordinates: 40.662183°N 74.216034°W

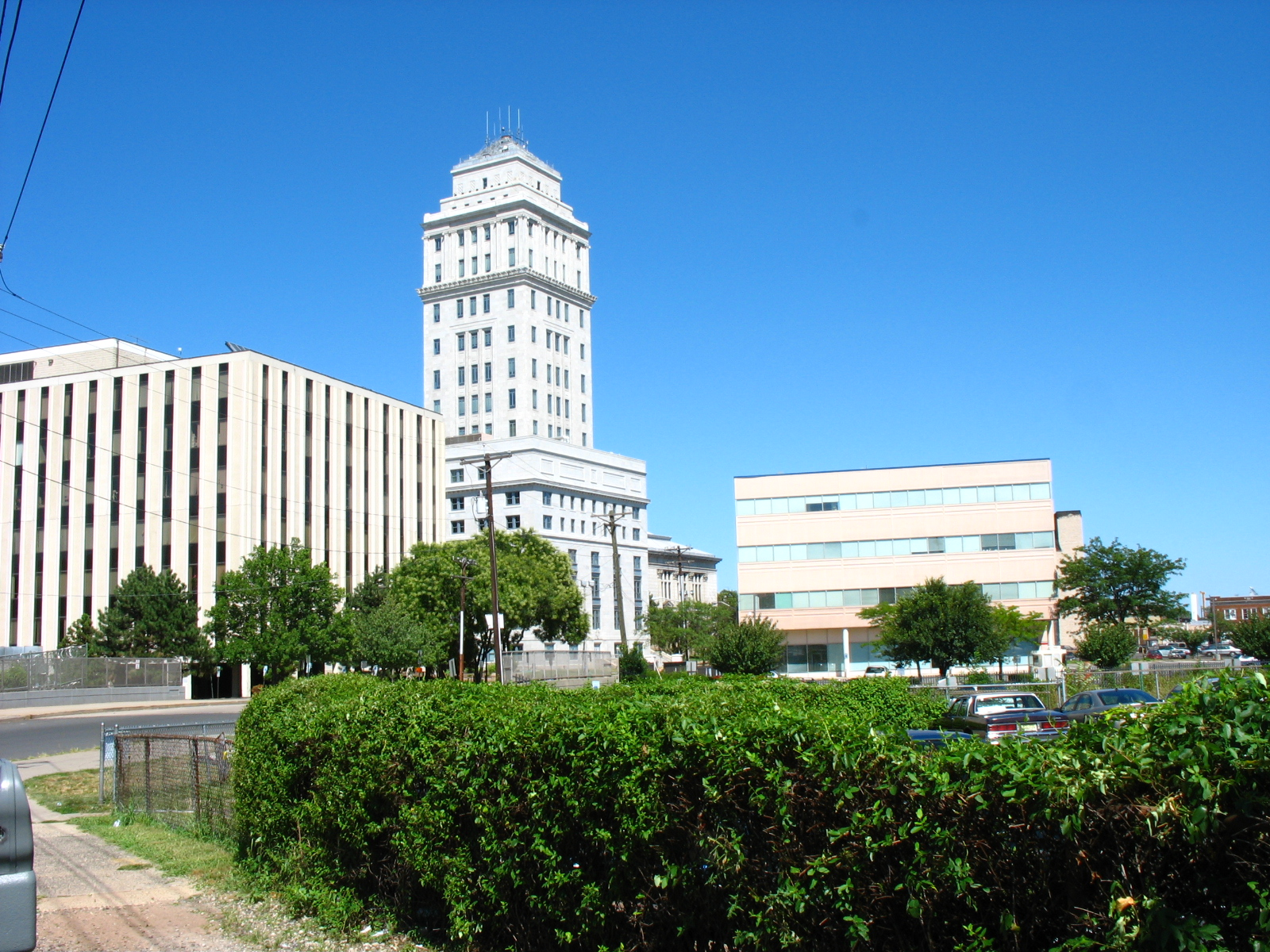
- Interactive map of the Union County Courthouse area

General information
- Type: Government
- Construction started: 1925
- Completed: 1931
- Cost: $1,200,000
- Owner: Union County, New Jersey

Height
- Roof: 72.54 m (238.0 ft)

Technical details
- Floor count: 17
- Lifts/elevators: 3

Design and construction
- Architects: Oakley and Son

References
- Mid-Town Historic District
- U.S. National Register of Historic Places
- U.S. Historic district – Contributing property
- New Jersey Register of Historic Places
- Location within Union County, New Jersey Location within New Jersey Location within the United States
- NRHP reference No.: 95001143
- NJRHP No.: 2665

Significant dates
- Added to NRHP: October 5, 1995
- Designated NJRHP: September 29, 1994

The Union County Courthouse is the county courthouse for Union County, New Jersey located in the county seat of Elizabeth. The 17 story, 238 ft (73 m) tall Neoclassical building, completed in 1931, is the tallest in the city. It is a contributing property to the Mid-Town Historic District. The courthouse building with 17-story tower was designed by the architect Oakley and Son and completed in 1931. The courthouse complex includes a 3-story portion, a 7-story annex building, built in 1927 a 5-story annex building, built in 1964 and an 8-story courtroom building, built in 1932. As of May, 2015, peregrine falcons had been nesting on the courthouse.

== Earlier building ==
An earlier courthouse building was designed by the architects Ackerman and Ross. In May 1905, according to one newspaper, "The work of engraving two tablets at the marble entrance to the new courthouse is in progress. The tablet on the right will read 'Union County Courthouse Commenced February 1903; Completed April 1905...Architects, Ackerman & Ross..."

== See also ==
- County courthouses in New Jersey
- National Register of Historic Places listings in Union County, New Jersey
- List of United States federal courthouses in New Jersey
- List of tallest buildings in New Jersey
