= Atlantic County Courthouse =

- U.S. Historic district – Contributing property
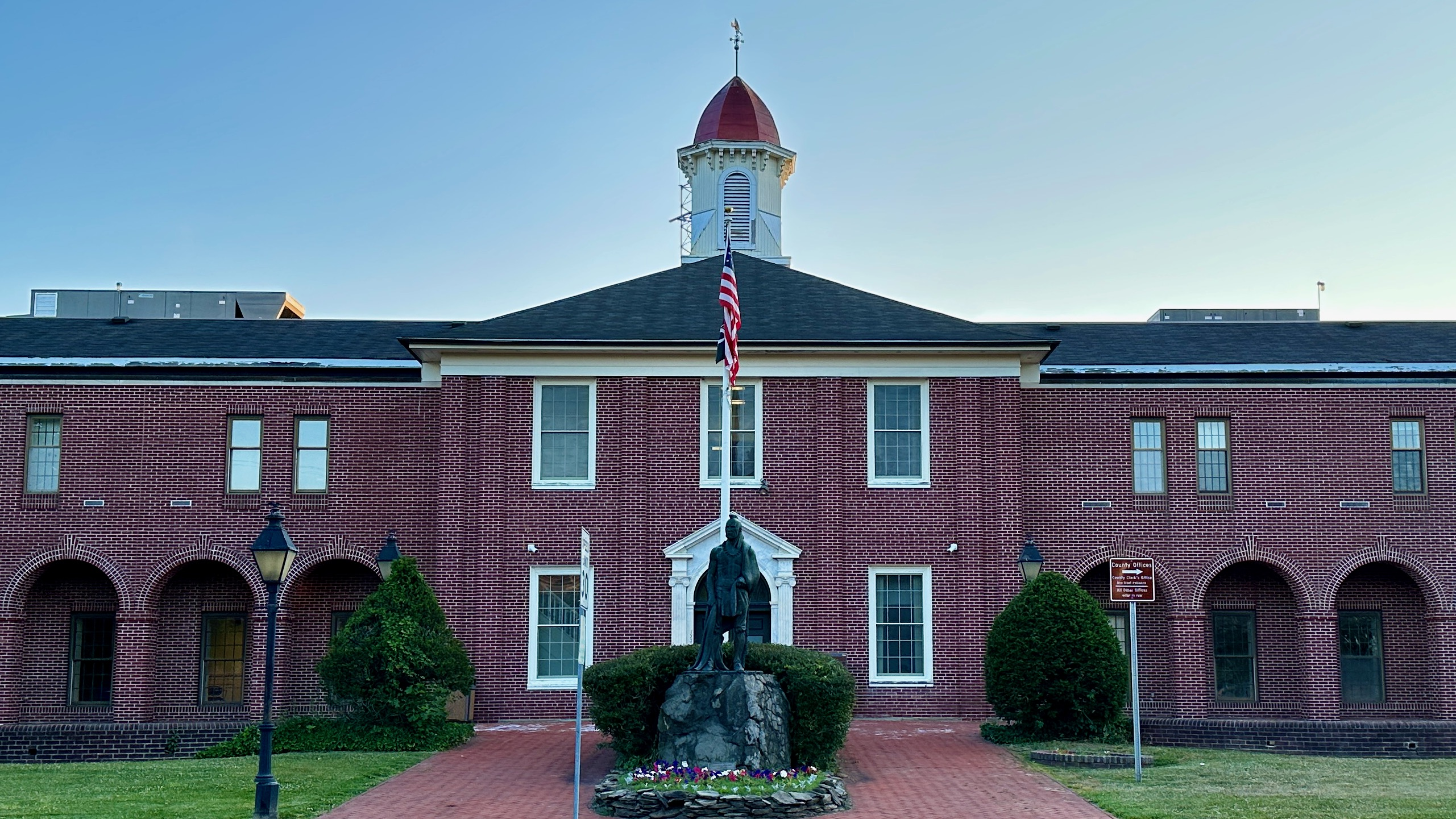
- 1838 Atlantic County Courthouse in Mays Landing

- Location within Atlantic County, New Jersey Location within New Jersey Location within the United States
- Location: 5901 Main Street; Mays Landing, New Jersey
- Coordinates: 39°27′07″N 74°43′34″W
- Built: 1838
- Part of: Mays Landing Historic District (ID90001245)
- Designated CP: August 23, 1990

The historic 1838 Atlantic County Courthouse is located at 5901 Main Street in Mays Landing, the county seat of Atlantic County, in Hamilton Township, New Jersey, United States.

== History and description ==
The courthouse was built shortly after the county was created in 1837. The building was originally constructed in 1838 and expanded over the years. It was renovated in 2010. The courthouse complex, which includes the courthouse, old sheriff's office, jail, and power plant, was added as a contributing property to the Mays Landing Historic District in 1990. It now houses the Office of County Clerk. The Atlantic County Sheriff's Office and older county jails are behind the building.

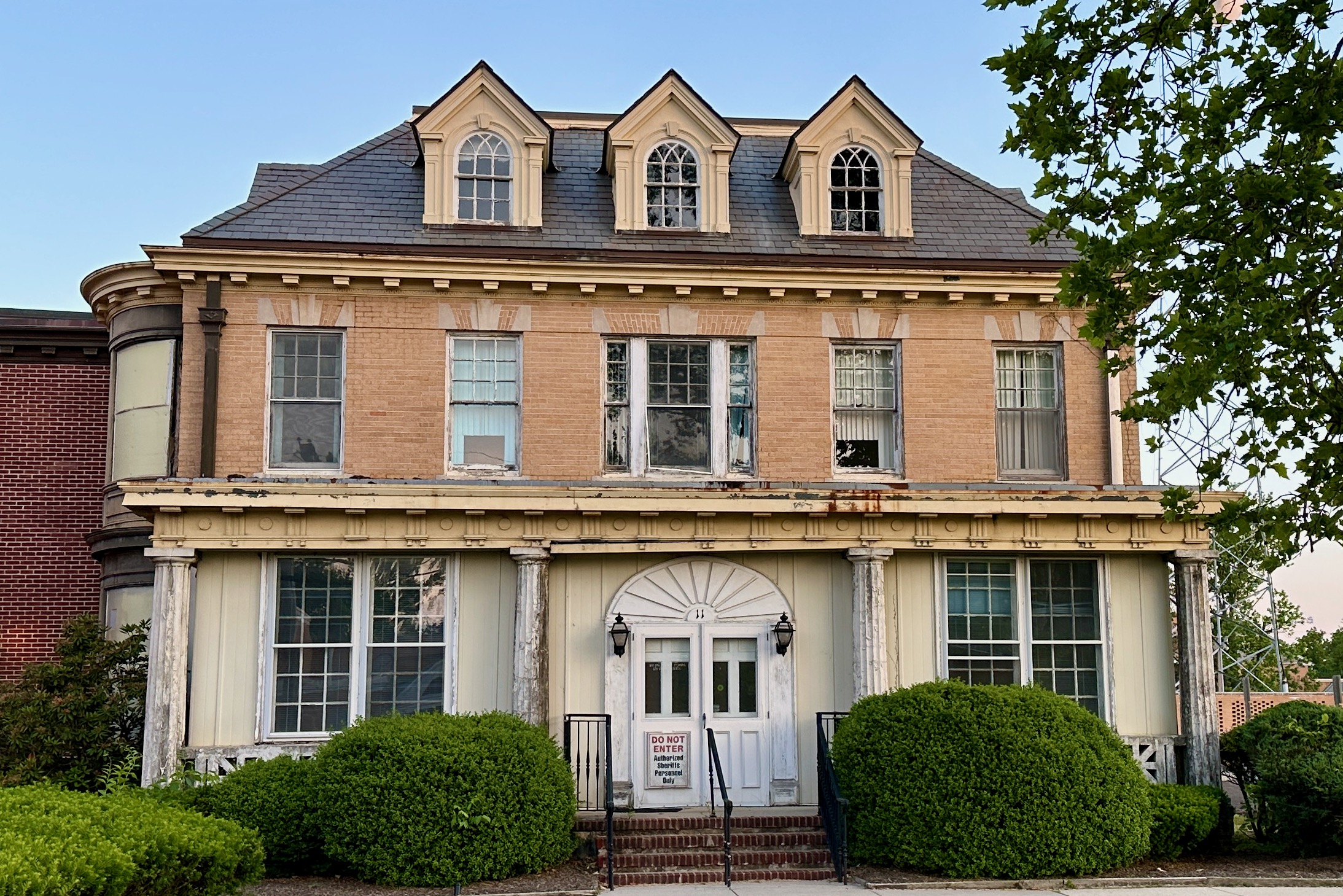
Former Atlantic County Sheriff's House in Mays Landing, built c. 1910

== Current courthouses ==
The historic courthouse complex has been superseded by the Atlantic County Criminal Courts Complex (1978) in Mays Landing (39°26′18″N 74°41′28″W) and the Atlantic County Civil Courts Complex in Atlantic City (39°21′50″N 74°25′36″W), which are part of the 1st vicinage.

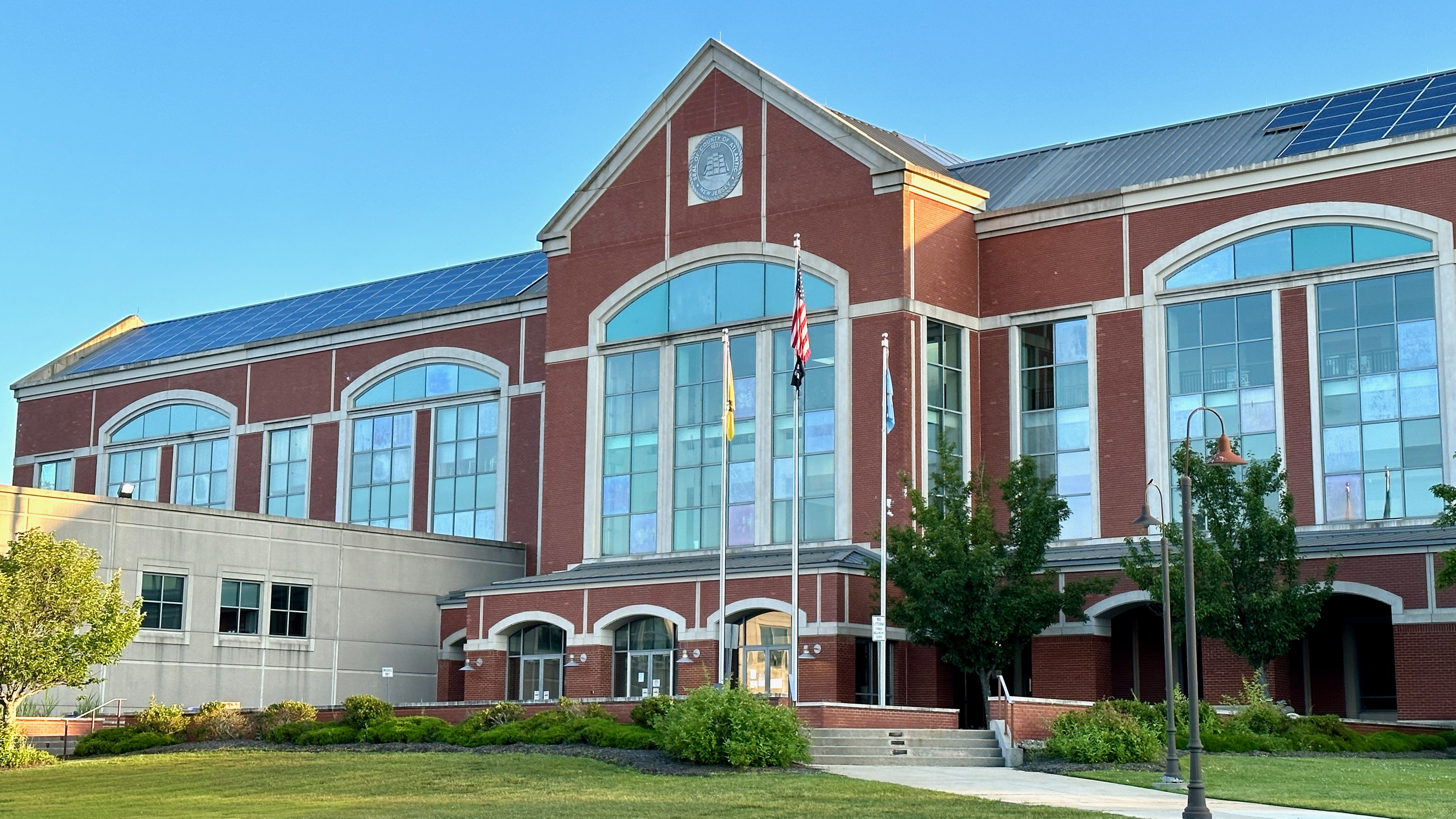
Atlantic County Criminal Courts Complex in Mays Landing

== See also ==
- List of county courthouses in New Jersey
- Federal courthouses in New Jersey
- Richard J. Hughes Justice Complex
