= Cape May County Courthouse =

Coordinates: 39°05′00″N 74°49′26″W

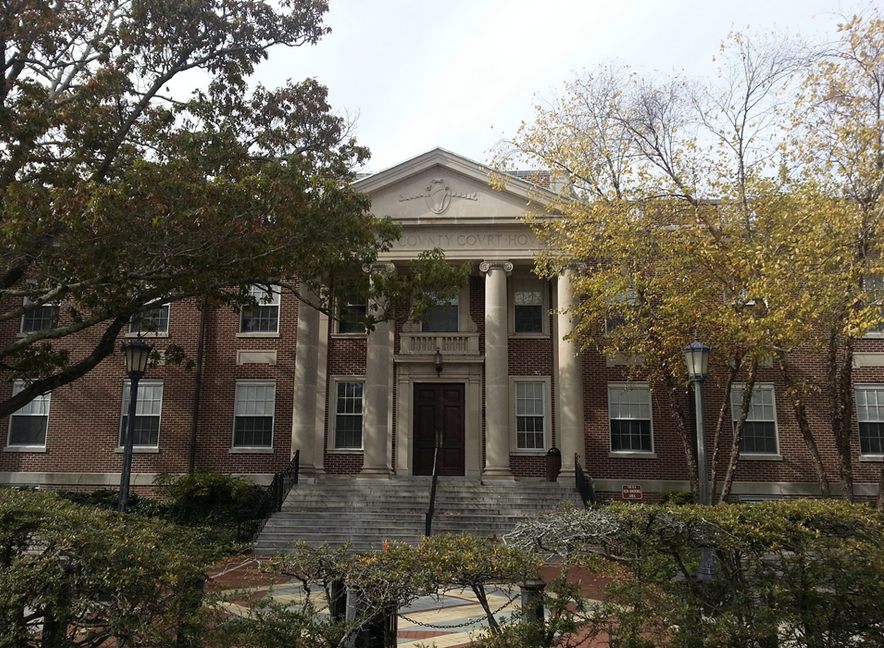
Cape May County Courthouse, October 2017

The Cape May County Courthouse is located at 9 North Main Street in Cape May Court House, the county seat of Cape May County, which itself is in Middle Township, New Jersey, United States.

It was designed by Edwards & Green of Camden and Philadelphia and built in 1926–1927 by Bennett McLaughlin Company, also of Philadelphia. They also designed the county seal, which was originally meant as a medallion for the new courthouse floor, and adopted as official in 1927.

It replaced the Old Cape May County Courthouse Building that had been built in 1848 and that was added to the National Register of Historic Places in 1981.

This First order, Fresnel lens from the top of the Cape May Lighthouse was moved to the courthouse.

== See also ==
- County courthouses in New Jersey
- Federal courthouses in New Jersey
- Richard J. Hughes Justice Complex
