= Monmouth County Courthouse =

Courthouse in New Jersey

Coordinates: 40°15′51″N 74°16′42″W

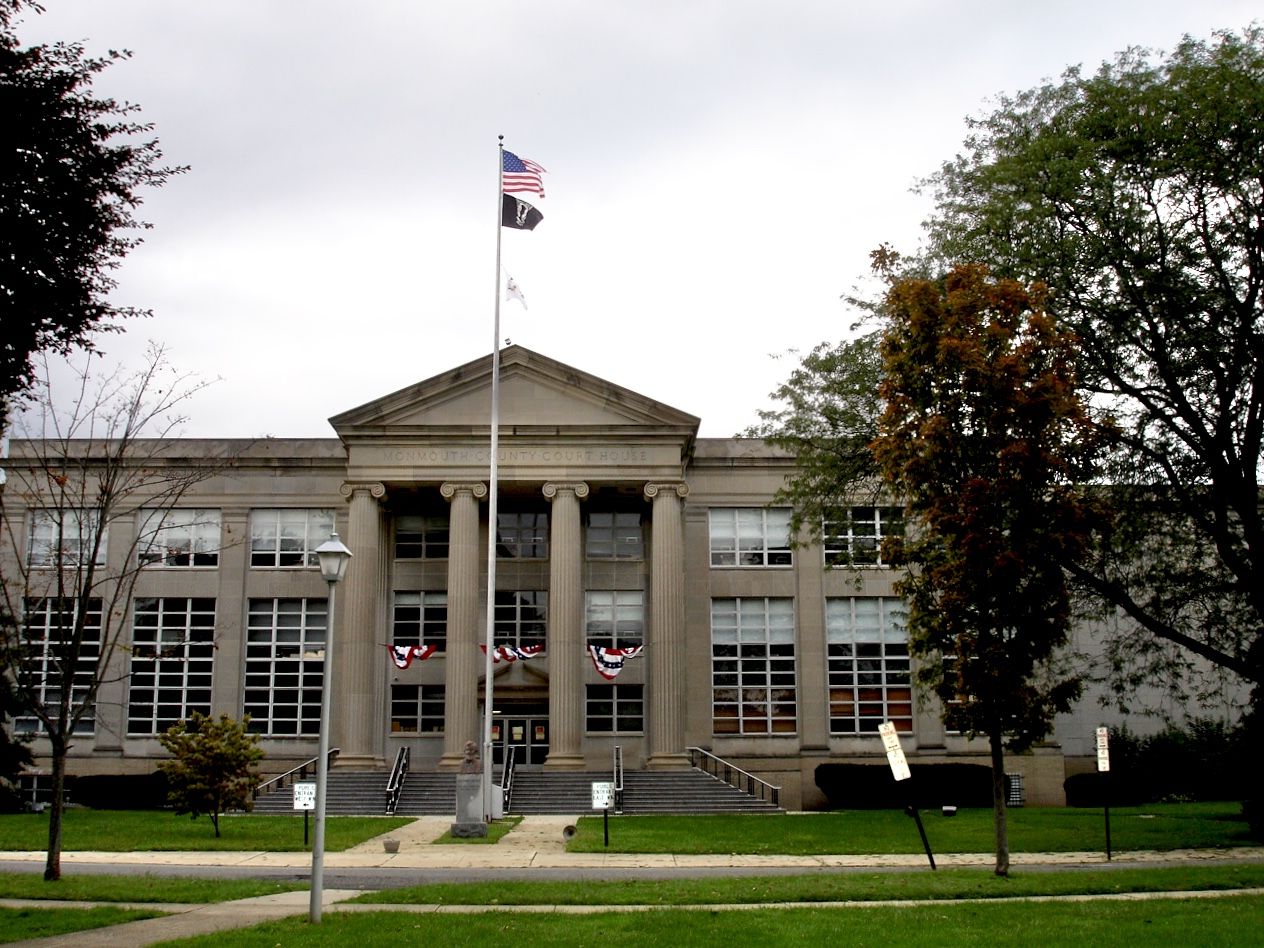
The front of the courthouse taken in 2006

The Monmouth County Courthouse is in Freehold, the county seat of Monmouth County, New Jersey, United States. It was designed by James W. Mancusa and built in 1954. The Battle of Monmouth Monument stands before the courthouse.

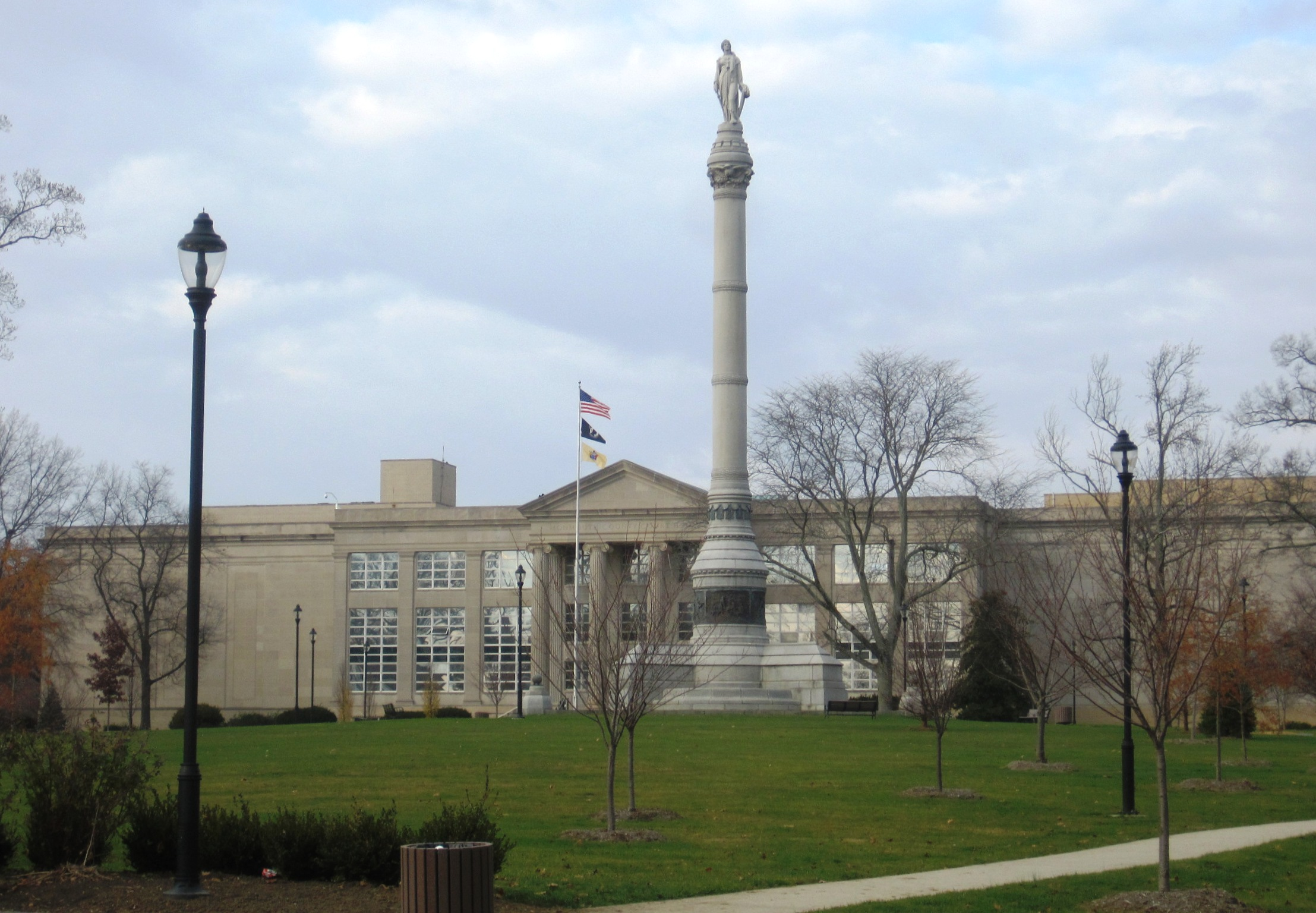
A 90-foot (27 m) tall monument to the battle in front of the Monmouth County Courthouse

== Earlier buildings ==
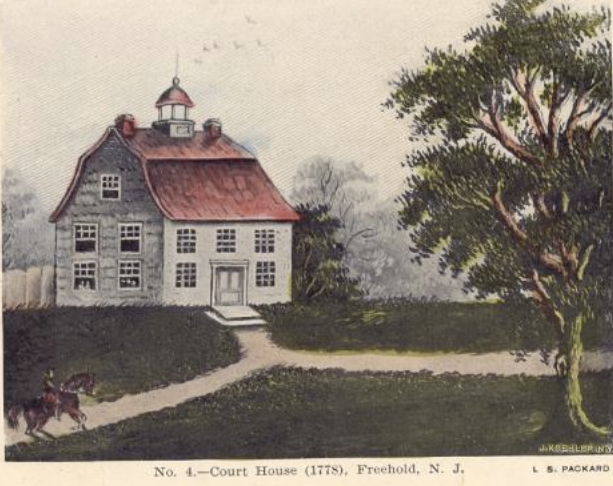
1730-1806

The first Court House of Monmouth County was erected in 1714–1715. This was a small wooden building and remained in use until a second courthouse was built in 1719, which was used until 1727 when it was destroyed by fire. In 1730-1731 a new court house and jail were erected on the same site. This building was used for 75 years and is the one which was made historic by the Battle of Monmouth as it is said that Gen. Washington made his headquarters in that building. The building was replaced in 1806-1809 by a new structure at a cost of $28,000. The fifth courthouse was built in 1855 and burned in October 1873.

== Hall of Records ==
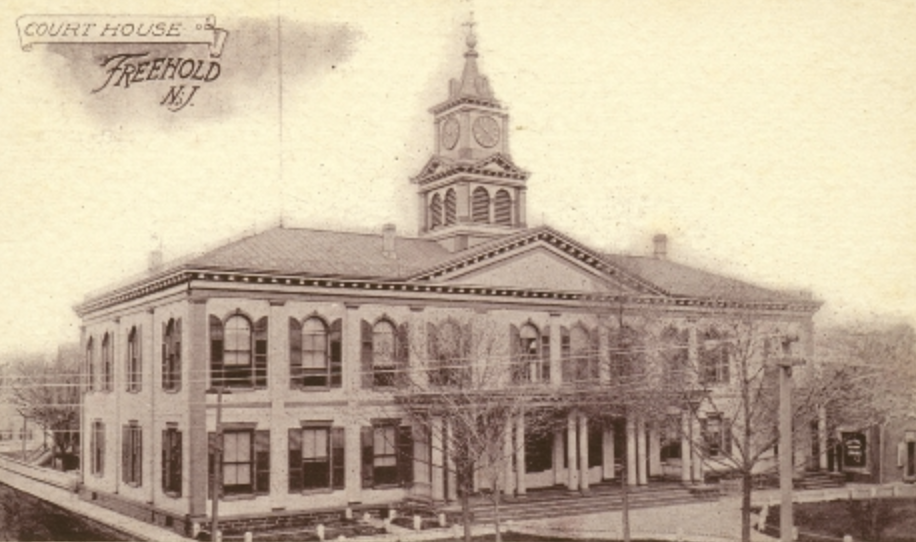
1874

Monmouth County Hall of Records is located at 1 East Main Street in Freehold Borough, New Jersey.

It served as the sixth courthouse, built according to the plans of the previous courthouse with alterations approved by Austin H. Patterson (who served on Board of Chosen Freeholders and in the New Jersey State Assembly). The clock in the tower was procured by funds raised by subscriptions and placed in the building which was erected in 1874. The building was damaged by fire in 1930 and restored in 1931. The architect was Leon Cubberley. The two-story structure faces south, on which side there is a one-story extended porch. From the hipped roof is a square white colored clock tower. In 1954 became the Hall of Records when the present Monmouth County Courthouse was erected.

== See also ==
- Courts of New Jersey
- County courthouses in New Jersey
- Richard J. Hughes Justice Complex
- Federal courthouses in New Jersey
- Freehold Public Library
- List of Washington's Headquarters during the Revolutionary War
