= Gloucester County Courthouse (New Jersey) =

Historic courthouse in New Jersey, United States

Coordinates: 39.8386°N 75.1534°W

Gloucester County Courthouse is the historic courthouse for Gloucester County, New Jersey. It is located in Woodbury, which is the county seat of Gloucester County.

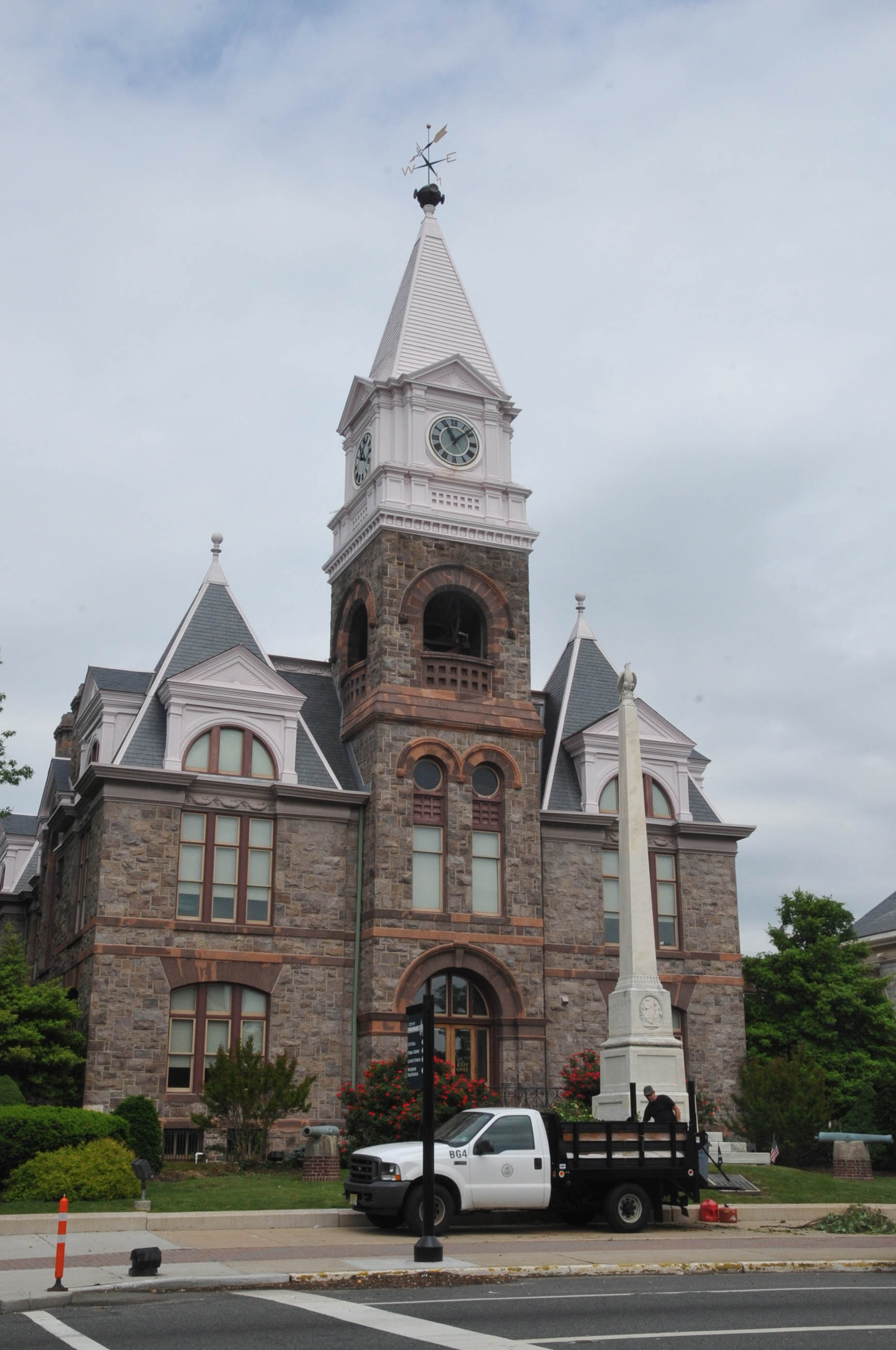
Gloucester County Courthouse in Woodbury, New Jersey

It was designed by architectural firm Hazelhurst and Huckel (whose work includes the Union Methodist Episcopal Church in Philadelphia, Pennsylvania) and built in 1885. Construction included the cornerstone of the 1787 building it replaced; the bell in the clock tower is also from the earlier building.

The courthouse is a contributing property to Broad Street Historic District, listed on the New Jersey Register of Historic Places (#1429) in 1988.

== See also ==
- County courthouses in New Jersey
- Richard J. Hughes Justice Complex
- Federal courthouses in New Jersey
