= Calvary Baptist Church (Ocean View, New Jersey) =

Historic church in New Jersey, United States

- U.S. National Register of Historic Places
- New Jersey Register of Historic Places
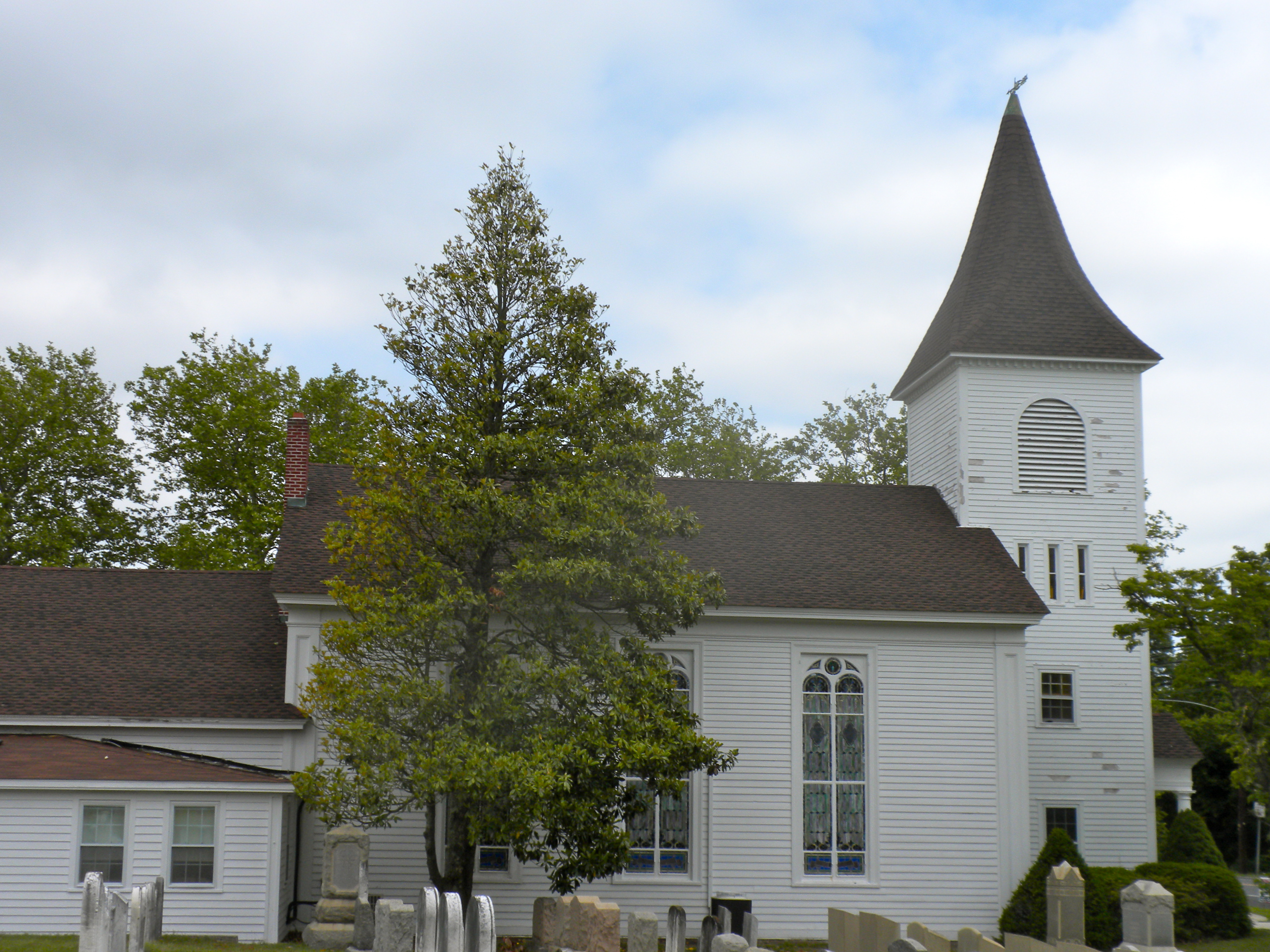

- Location within Cape May County, New Jersey Location within New Jersey Location within the United States
- Location: Corner of Seaville Road and U.S. Route 9, Ocean View, New Jersey
- Coordinates: 39°10′14″N 74°44′26″W
- Area: 6.3 acres (2.5 ha)
- Built: 1855
- Architect: Daniel Hand
- Architectural style: Greek Revival, Victorian
- NRHP reference No.: 80002477
- NJRHP No.: 989

Significant dates
- Added to NRHP: November 25, 1980
- Designated NJRHP: August 15, 1980

The Calvary Baptist Church is located at the corner of Seaville Road and U.S. Route 9 in the Ocean View section of Dennis Township in Cape May County, New Jersey, United States. The historic church was built in 1855 and was added to the National Register of Historic Places on November 25, 1980, for its significance in architecture.

According to the nomination form, it is the oldest Baptist church in the township, and second oldest in the county. It was built in 1855 by the master builder/architect Daniel Hand and features vernacular Greek Revival and Victorian architecture. Hand also designed the New Asbury Methodist Episcopal Meeting House and the Old Cape May County Courthouse Building.

== See also ==
- National Register of Historic Places listings in Cape May County, New Jersey
