= New Asbury Methodist Episcopal Meeting House =

Historic church in New Jersey, United States

- U.S. National Register of Historic Places
- New Jersey Register of Historic Places
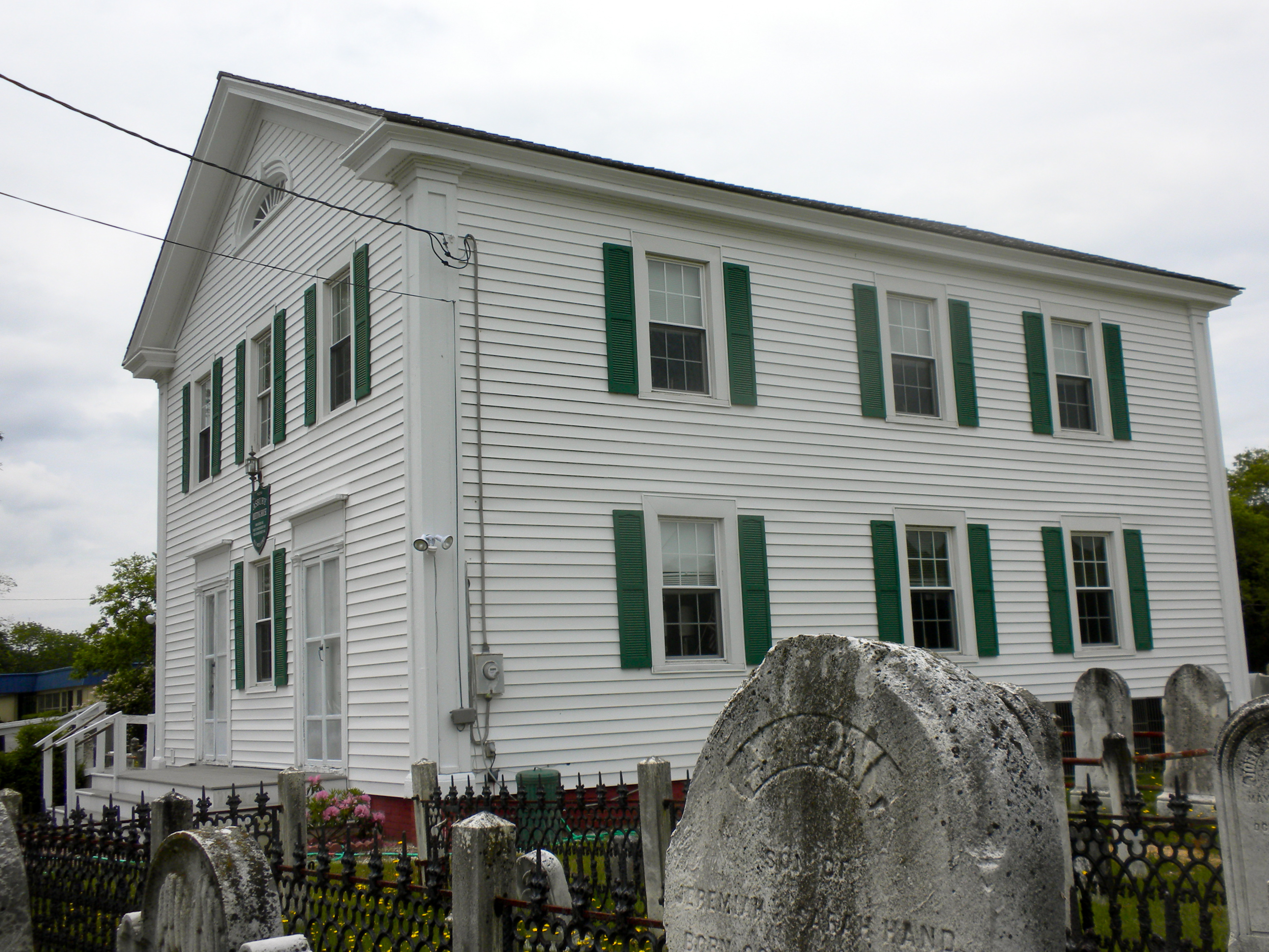
- In 2010

- Location within Cape May County, New Jersey Location within New Jersey Location within the United States
- Location: Shore Road, Middle Township, New Jersey
- Coordinates: 39°8′25″N 74°46′10″W
- Area: 8 acres (3.2 ha)
- Built: 1852
- Architect: Daniel Hand
- Architectural style: Greek Revival
- NRHP reference No.: 80002476
- NJRHP No.: 1005

Significant dates
- Added to NRHP: September 17, 1980
- Designated NJRHP: April 18, 1980

The New Asbury Methodist Episcopal Meeting House, also known as the Asbury United Methodist Church, is a historic church located on Shore Road (U.S. Route 9) in Middle Township of Cape May County, New Jersey, about six miles north of Cape May Court House. It was built in 1852 and added to the National Register of Historic Places on September 17, 1980, for its significance in architecture and religion. It was documented by the Historic American Buildings Survey (HABS) in 1992.

The Greek Revival church was built in 1852 by the master builder/architect Daniel Hand, who also built the Old Cape May County Courthouse Building and the Calvary Baptist Church. It should not be confused with the First United Methodist Church in Cape May Court House which stands immediately north of the Old Cape May County Courthouse Building.

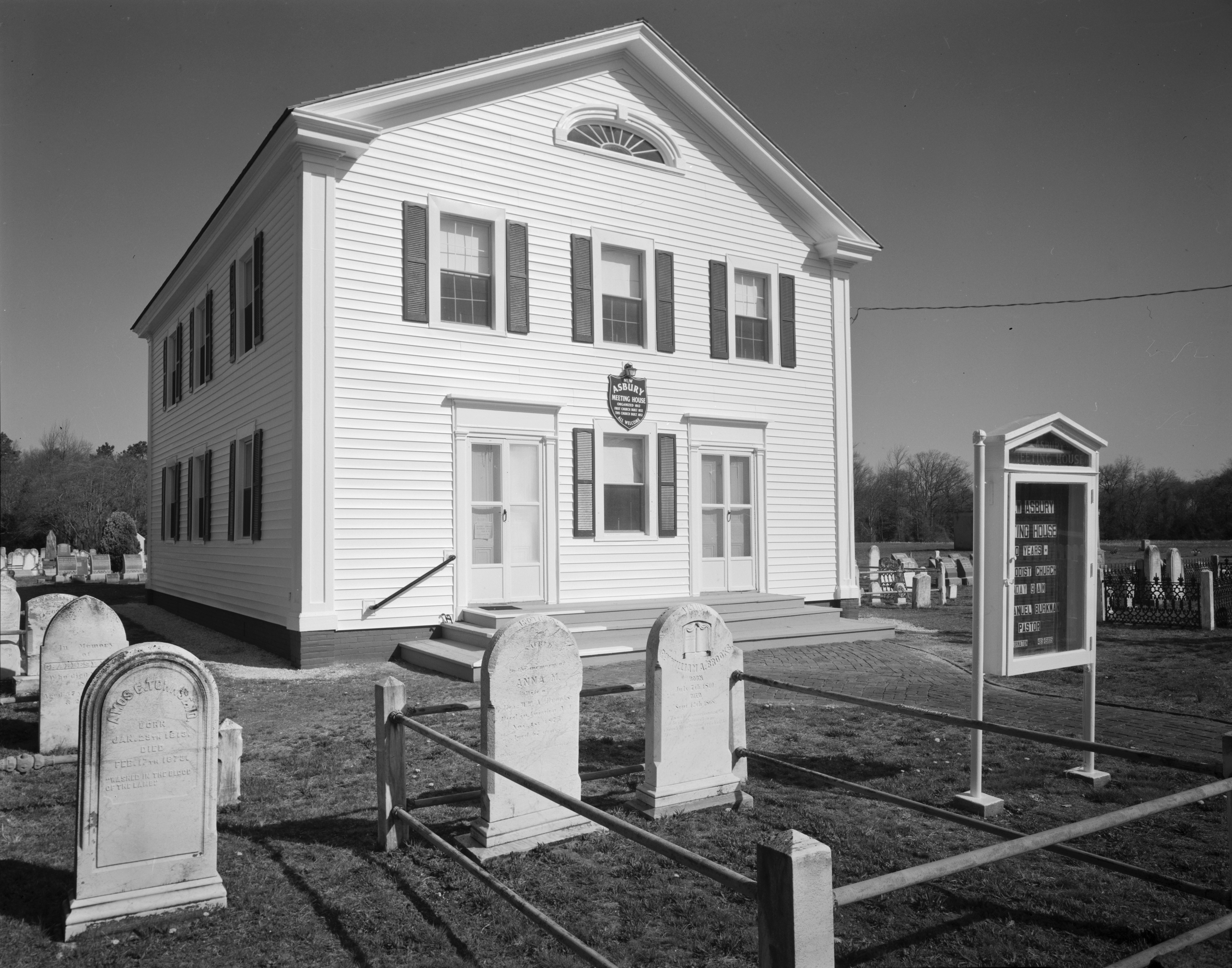
Historic American Buildings Survey photo 1992

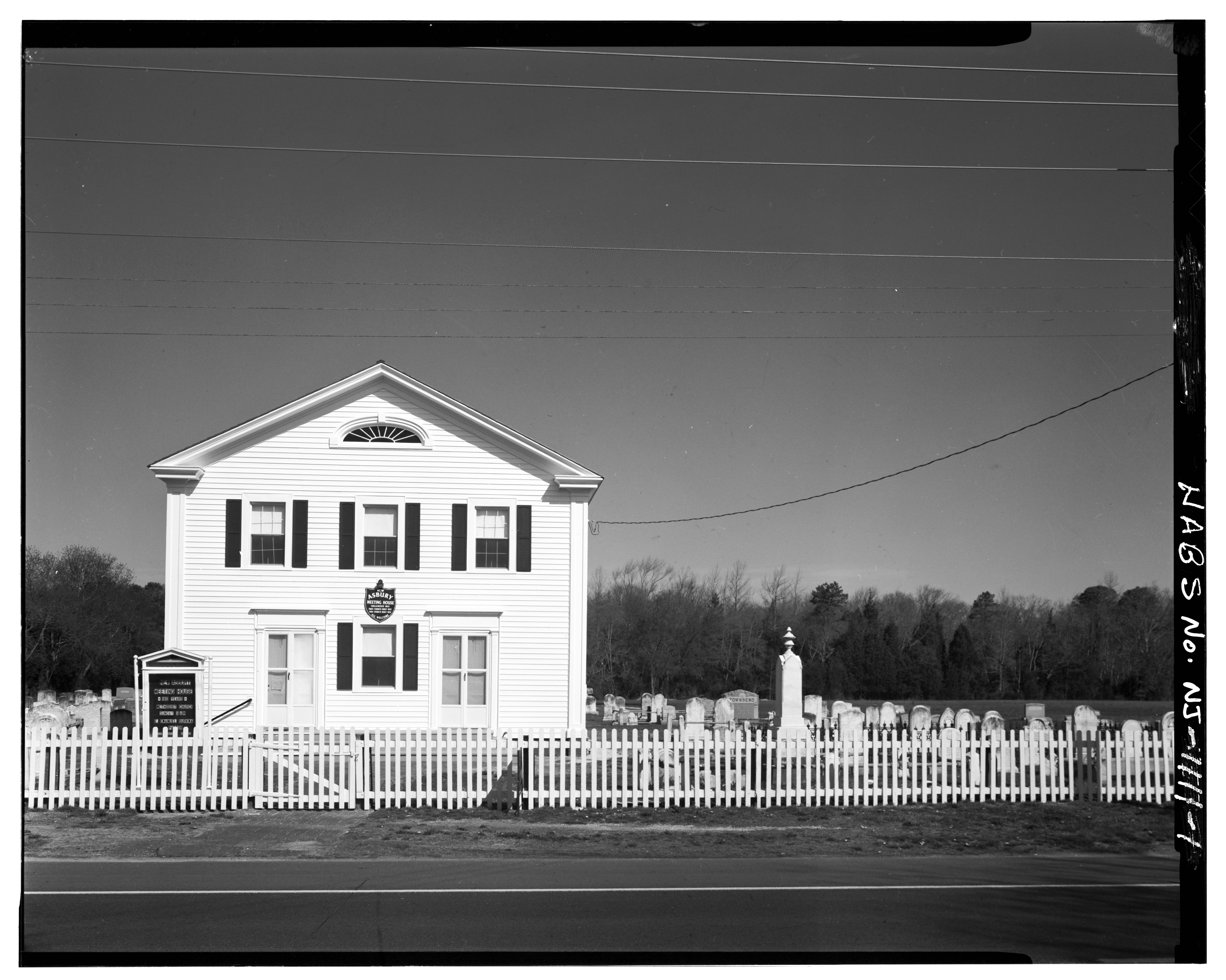
Historic American Buildings Survey photo 1992

== See also ==
- National Register of Historic Places listings in Cape May County, New Jersey
