= Old Cape May County Courthouse Building =

- U.S. National Register of Historic Places
- New Jersey Register of Historic Places
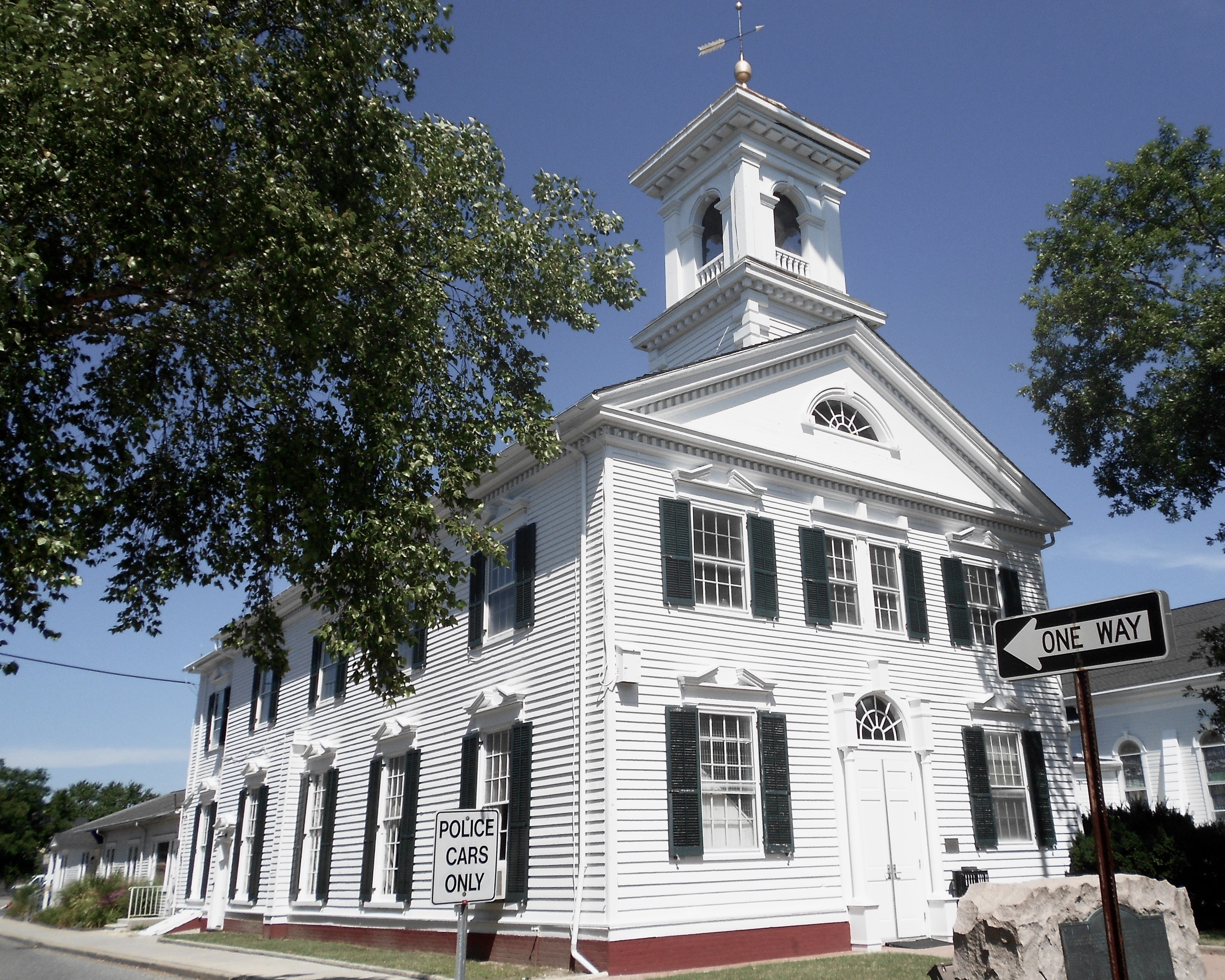

- Location within Cape May County, New Jersey Location within New Jersey Location within the United States
- Location: North Main Street, Cape May Court House, New Jersey
- Coordinates: 39°5′2″N 74°49′26″W
- Built: 1848–1850
- Architect: Daniel Hand
- Architectural style: Greek Revival, Georgian
- NRHP reference No.: 81000389
- NJRHP No.: 1006

Significant dates
- Added to NRHP: December 22, 1981
- Designated NJRHP: October 29, 1981

The Old Cape May County Courthouse Building is located on North Main Street (U.S. Route 9) in the Cape May Court House section of Middle Township in Cape May County, New Jersey, United States. The historic courthouse was completed in 1850 and was added to the National Register of Historic Places on December 22, 1981, for its significance in architecture and politics/government. It was documented by the Historic American Buildings Survey (HABS) in 1992.

The Georgian courthouse was designed and built from 1848 to 1850 by the master builder/architect Daniel Hand and features a Greek Revival interior. Hand also designed the New Asbury Methodist Episcopal Meeting House and the Calvary Baptist Church. It was replaced by the Cape May County Courthouse in 1927.

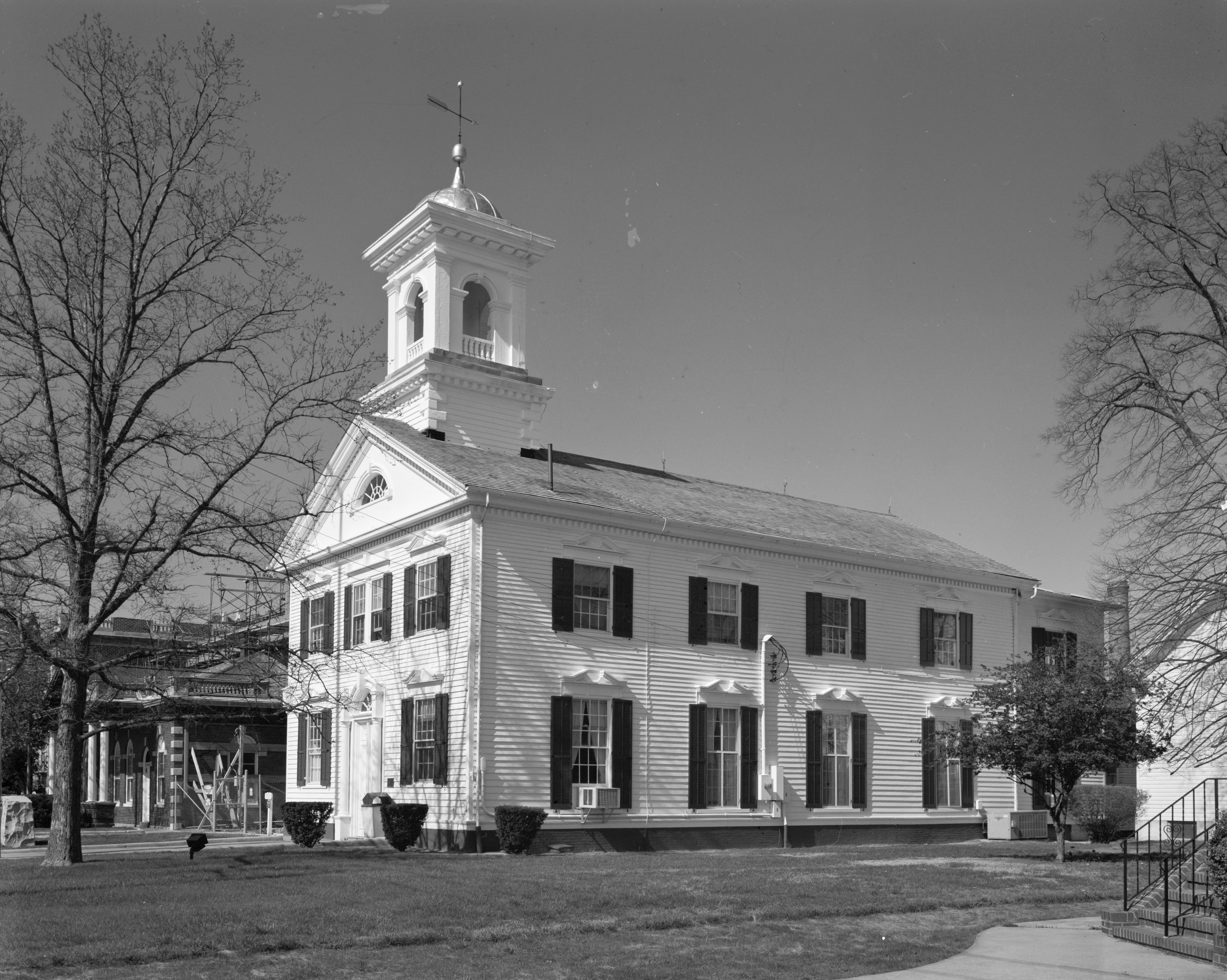
HABS photo from 1992

== See also ==
- National Register of Historic Places listings in Cape May County, New Jersey
- List of county courthouses in New Jersey
