= Clarkson S. Fisher Federal Building and United States Courthouse =

- United States Courthouse and Post Office
- U.S. National Register of Historic Places
- New Jersey Register of Historic Places
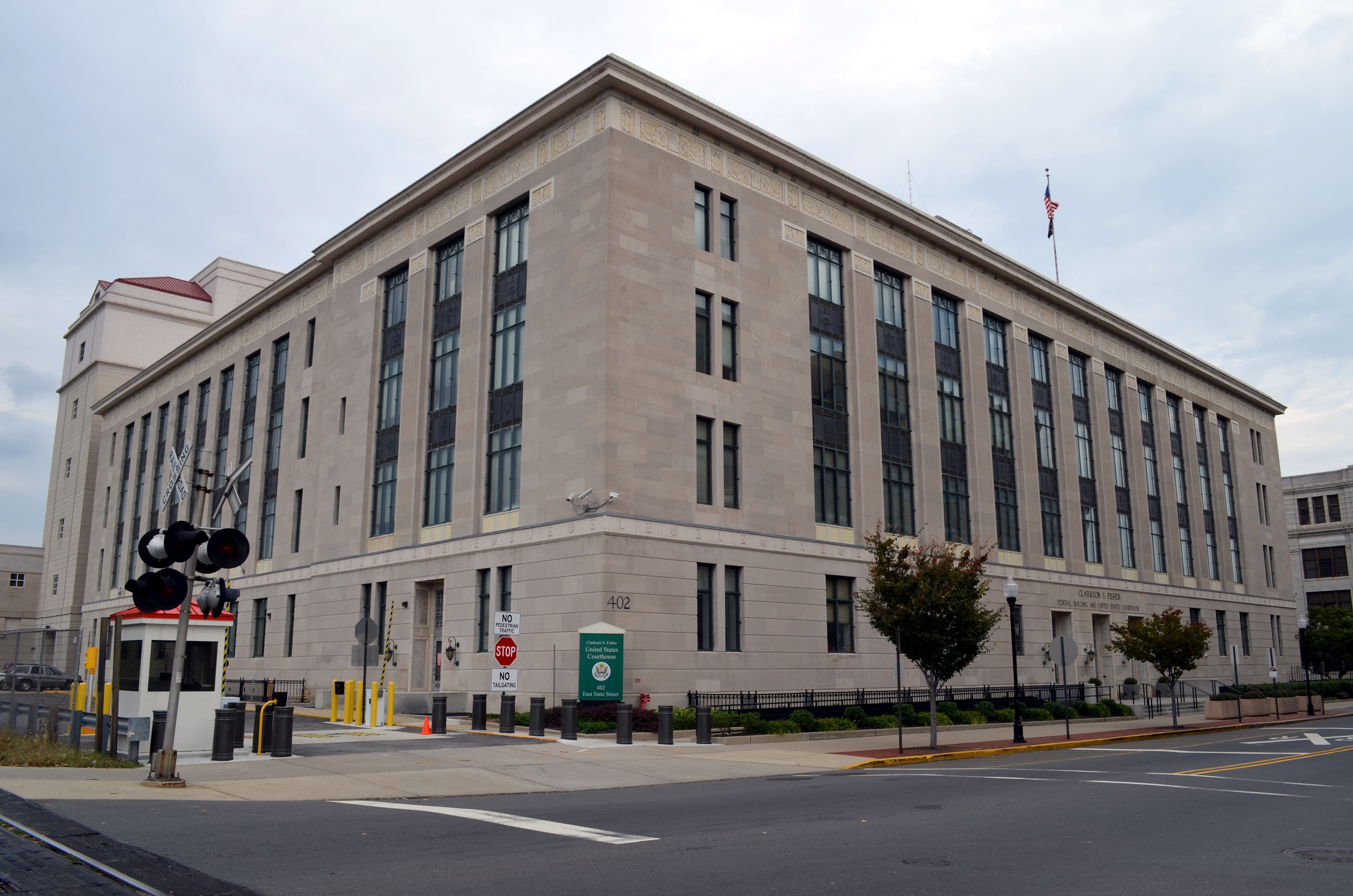

- Location within Mercer County, New Jersey Location within New Jersey Location within the United States
- Location: 402 State Street; Trenton, New Jersey
- Coordinates: 40°13′16.1″N 74°45′26.3″W
- Area: less than one acre
- Built: 1932
- Architect: James A. Wetmore
- Architectural style: Renaissance
- NRHP reference No.: 12000309
- NJRHP No.: 1806
- Designated NJRHP: May 24, 2012

The Clarkson S. Fisher Federal Building and United States Courthouse, originally known as the United States Courthouse and Federal Building, is located in Trenton, Mercer County, New Jersey. It houses the United States District Court for the District of New Jersey.

The building was designed by James A. Wetmore and completed in 1932. The "stripped" Neoclassic structure contains murals by Charles Wells. It was added to the state register of historic places in 1989 and federal register in 2012. It was named for federal judge Clarkson Sherman Fisher in 1993 prior to his death in 1997.

== See also ==
- List of United States federal courthouses in New Jersey
- National Register of Historic Places listings in Mercer County, New Jersey
- Mercer County Courthouse (New Jersey)
- Richard J. Hughes Justice Complex
