= Judiciary of New Jersey =

The judiciary of New Jersey is the judicial branch of the State of New Jersey, established by Article VI of the New Jersey Constitution. It consists of the New Jersey Supreme Court as the state supreme court, the New Jersey Superior Court as the court of general jurisdiction, and many lower courts of limited jurisdiction. The judges of the state courts are appointed by the Governor with the advice and consent of the Senate.

== Courts ==
=== Supreme Court ===
The New Jersey Supreme Court consists of a Chief Justice and six Associate Justices. All are appointed by the Governor with the advice and consent of a majority of the membership of the State Senate. Justices serve an initial seven-year term, after which they can be reappointed to serve until age 70.

=== Superior Court, Appellate Division ===
The New Jersey Superior Court, Appellate Division functions as the state's intermediate appellate court. Superior Court judges are assigned to the Appellate Division by the Chief Justice.

=== Superior Court ===
More serious criminal cases and all civil cases (except tax matters) are handled by the New Jersey Superior Court for each county. All Superior Court judges are appointed by the Governor with the advice and consent of a majority of the membership of the State Senate. Judges serve an initial seven-year term and can be reappointed to serve until age 70.

New Jersey's judiciary is unusual in that it still has separate courts of law and equity, like its neighbor Delaware but unlike most other U.S. states. The New Jersey Superior Court is divided into Law and Chancery Divisions at the trial level. However, unlike Delaware, the Law and Chancery Divisions exchange judges relatively freely; they can be and are moved to the other division as needed. Furthermore, the Chancery Division is granted the power to award money damages when appropriate in an action primarily for equitable relief, and the Law Division is granted the power to order limited equitable relief in a suit primarily for money damages, unlike their Delaware counterparts. Domestic relations matters, such as divorce, child custody, and domestic violence restraining order cases are heard in a subdivision of the Chancery Division named the Family Part.

=== Municipal Courts ===
The Municipal Courts carry out most of the day-to-day work in the New Jersey courts by hearing simple traffic tickets and minor criminal offenses. The Municipal Courts may also issue emergency temporary restraining orders in domestic violence cases when the Superior Court is closed (typically in conjunction with a criminal report on an incident by police).

The Municipal Courts in New Jersey are considered courts of limited jurisdiction, responsible for handling motor vehicle and parking tickets, minor criminal offenses and violations (for example, simple assault and bad checks), municipal ordinance offenses (such as dog barking or building code violations), and other offenses, such as fish and game violations. A Municipal Court has jurisdiction only over those cases that occur within the boundaries of its municipality. Many serious criminal cases, such as robbery, auto theft, or assault, start out as complaints filed in the Municipal Court; however, those cases are then transferred to the Superior Court located at the county courthouse.

=== Tax Court ===
The Tax Court is a court of limited jurisdiction. Tax Court judges hear appeals of tax decisions made by County Boards of Taxation. They also hear appeals on decisions made by the Director of the Division of Taxation on such matters as state income, sales and business taxes, and homestead rebates. Appeals from Tax Court decisions are heard in the Appellate Division of Superior Court. Tax Court judges are appointed by the Governor for initial terms of seven years, and upon reappointment are granted tenure until they reach the mandatory retirement age of 70. There are 12 Tax Court judgeships.

== See also ==
- New Jersey Office of Administrative Law - adjudicates cases brought by or pending before state agencies
- Government of New Jersey
- Law of New Jersey
- Law enforcement in New Jersey
- List of justices of the Supreme Court of New Jersey
- Courts of New Jersey
- List of United States federal courthouses in New Jersey
- County courthouses in New Jersey
- Richard J. Hughes Justice Complex
- United States District Court for the District of New Jersey
