= Maria Barnaby Greenwald =

American judge

Maria Barnaby Greenwald (May 3, 1940 – January 11, 1995) was an American politician, the Mayor of Cherry Hill, New Jersey, and surrogate for the New Jersey Superior Court.

== Background ==
Greenwald was born on May 3, 1940, in Camden, New Jersey, the daughter of Louis and Carmella (Corrado) Ciarrocchi. She attended Pierce Junior College in Philadelphia, graduating in 1960. She worked as a teacher at the Trinity Presbyterian Nursery in Cherry Hill from 1973 to 1976 and as an employment counselor at Snelling & Snelling in 1976–1977.

== Career ==
Greenwald began her political career when she was elected to the Cherry Hill Township Council, and served as the community's first woman mayor, from 1977 to 1979. In 1981, she became the first directly elected mayor under a new form of government, a post she held until 1987.

Greenwald became the first woman elected to the Camden County Board of Chosen Freeholder and served 1980–1981, and was the first woman director of the seven-member body. She became first woman surrogate for the New Jersey Superior Court in Camden County in 1993, where she served until her death.

== Death and legacy ==
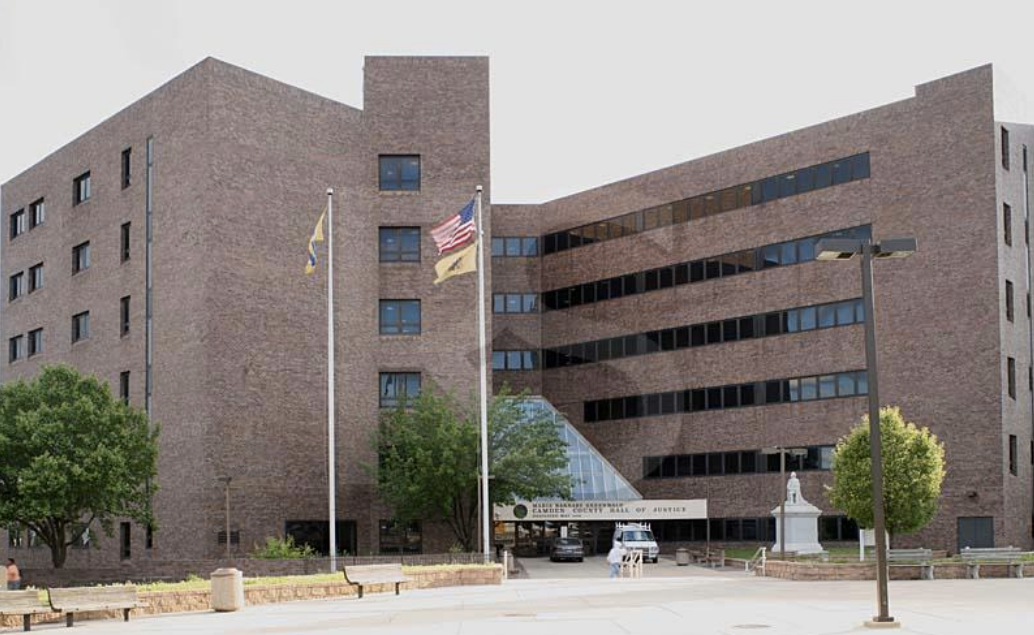
The Maria Barnaby Greenwald Camden County Hall of Justice

Greenwald died in January 1995 in a car crash when her car ran off a rain-slick road and struck a tree. The Camden County Hall of Justice, the county courthouse for Camden County located in the county seat, the City of Camden, was dedicated to her in 1996. The 47-acre Maria Barnaby Greenwald Memorial Park in Cherry Hill is also dedicated to her memory. Maria's Women United is a political association founded in 2016 and named in Greenwald's honor.

== Personal life ==
She was married to Floyd T. Greenwald (d. 2001), who worked for the South Jersey Port Corporation. They had two sons, Thomas and Louis Greenwald (b. 1967), who has served in the New Jersey General Assembly since 1996, where he represents the 6th Legislative District.
