= Ocean View, New Jersey =

Populated place in Cape May County, New Jersey, US

- Census-designated place
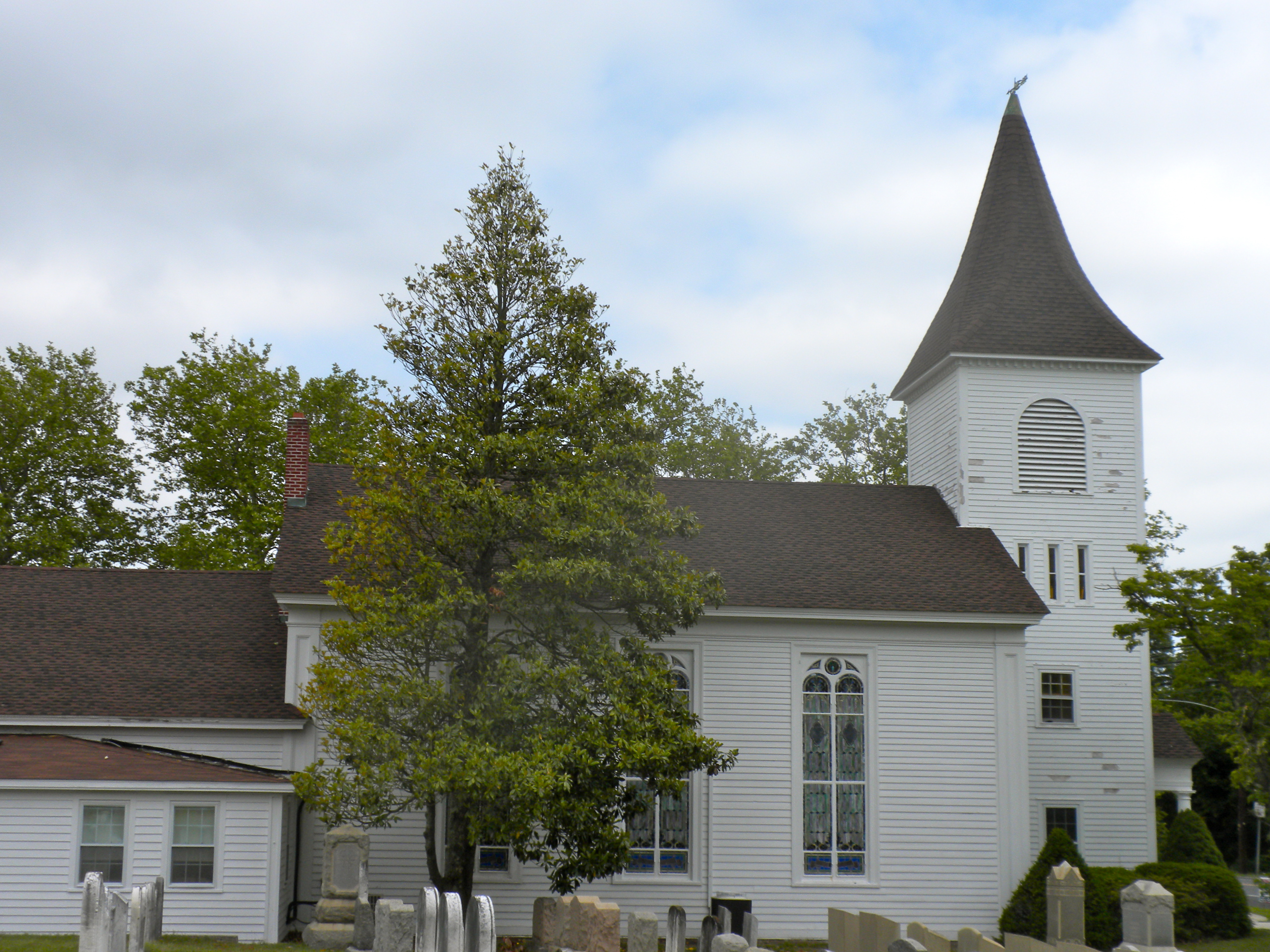
- Calvary Baptist Church in Ocean View

- Location in Cape May County Location in New Jersey Location in the United States
- Coordinates: 39°10′35″N 74°44′01″W
- Country: United States
- State: New Jersey
- County: Cape May
- Township: Dennis

Area
  - Total: 2.98 sq mi (7.72 km^{2})
  - Land: 2.91 sq mi (7.53 km^{2})
  - Water: 0.073 sq mi (0.19 km^{2})
- Elevation: 20 ft (6.1 m)

Population (2020)
  - Total: 685
  - Density: 235.6/sq mi (90.97/km^{2})
- ZIP Code: 08230
- Area codes: 609, 640
- GNIS feature ID: 0878941

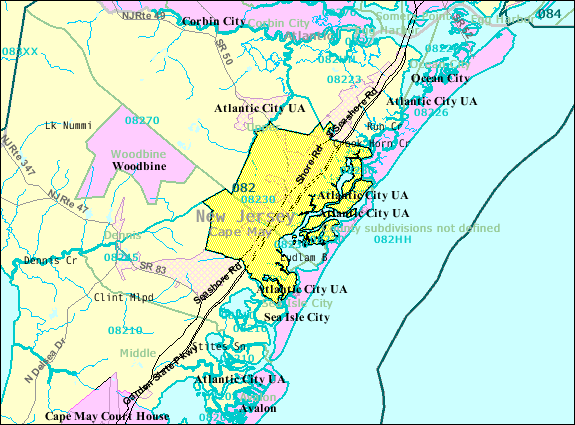
United States Census Bureau map of ZCTA 08230 Ocean View, New Jersey

Ocean View is an unincorporated community and census-designated place (CDP) located within Dennis Township in Cape May County, in the U.S. state of New Jersey. As of the 2020 census, Ocean View had a population of 685. The area is served as United States Postal Service ZIP Code 08230. The post office was established in 1872, with William Doolittle as the first postmaster.

Ocean View is located at 39°10′35″N 74°44′01″W.

== Demographics ==
Historical population
Census	Pop.	Note	%±
2020	685		—
U.S. Decennial Census; 2020

Ocean View was first listed as a census designated place in the 2020 U.S. census.

Ocean View CDP, New Jersey – Racial and ethnic composition Note: the US Census treats Hispanic/Latino as an ethnic category. This table excludes Latinos from the racial categories and assigns them to a separate category. Hispanics/Latinos may be of any race.
Race / Ethnicity (NH = Non-Hispanic)	Pop 2020	2020
White alone (NH)	595	86.86%
Black or African American alone (NH)	13	1.90%
Native American or Alaska Native alone (NH)	2	0.29%
Asian alone (NH)	6	0.88%
Native Hawaiian or Pacific Islander alone (NH)	0	0.00%
Other race alone (NH)	3	0.44%
Mixed race or Multiracial (NH)	31	4.53%
Hispanic or Latino (any race)	35	5.11%
Total	685	100.00%

As of the 2020 United States census, the population was 685.

== Education ==
Dennis Township Public Schools is the local K-8 school district, which feeds into Middle Township High School of Middle Township Public Schools.

Countywide schools include Cape May County Technical High School and Cape May County Special Services School District.

The Roman Catholic Diocese of Camden operates Bishop McHugh Regional School, which the Press of Atlantic City describes as being in Ocean View, though it lies outside of the CDP, and which has a Cape May Courthouse postal address. As of 2020 students from the following Cape May County locations attended the school: Dennis Township, Avalon, Cape May, Lower Township, Middle Township, North Wildwood, Ocean City, Sea Isle City, Stone Harbor, Upper Township, Wildwood, and Woodbine. It also received students from Egg Harbor Township in Atlantic County and Millville in Cumberland County.
