= List of county courthouses in New Jersey =

A clickable New Jersey county map

There are 21 counties in the state of New Jersey. The New Jersey Superior Court subsumed and replaced the New Jersey County Courts, which were abolished in 1978. The Superior Court has 15 vicinages (jurisdictional districts or circuits), some encompassing two or three counties, each of which has its own courthouse or courthouses. Frequently the county courthouse is home to the appropriate vicinage of the Superior Court. Some counties have different facilities for different divisions, such as the criminal, civil, family, and finance courts. In some counties there are other buildings which house court facilities where proceedings take place, some of which are historic county courthouse or administration buildings, which may also serve as offices for county, state or federal agencies.

Many court buildings have been evaluated by the state historic preservation office (SHPO) and have been listed on the New Jersey Register of Historic Places (NJRHP) and the National Register of Historic Places (NRHP), either individually or as contributing properties (CP) to historic districts. Several have been documented by the Historic American Buildings Survey (HABS). Three courthouses (at Salem, Sussex, and Burlington) dating from the 18th century that are among the oldest courthouses in the United States still in active use.

The Richard J. Hughes Justice Complex in Trenton, the state capital, is home the administrative headquarters of the statewide court system of the Judiciary of New Jersey, including the New Jersey Supreme Court and the Appellate Division of the New Jersey Superior Court.

The below lists include buildings in active use as well as extant historic buildings that have served county courthouses.

== Courthouses ==
| County, Courthouse, Location | Image | Map | Built, Architect | SHPO NJRHP (SR) NRHP (NR) HABS | Notes | References |
|---|---|---|---|---|---|---|
| Atlantic, Atlantic County Criminal Courts Complex, Mays Landing, Hamilton Township; 39°26′18″N 74°41′28″W | | | 1978 | | | |
| Atlantic, Atlantic County Civil Courts Complex, Atlantic City; 39°21′50″N 74°25′36″W | | | | | | |
| Bergen, Bergen County Court House, Hackensack; 40°52′43″N 74°02′38″W | | | 1910–12, James Riely Gordon | SR: 520 (1982); NR: 83001468 (1983) | | |
| Burlington, Burlington County Courthouse, Mount Holly; 39°59′46″N 74°47′21″W | | | 1796, Michael Rush | CP: Mount Holly Historic District; SR: 842 (1972); NR: 73001084 (1973); HABS NJ-27 | | |
| Camden, Camden County Hall of Justice, Camden; 39°56′35″N 75°07′21″W | | | 1982 | | | |
| Cape May, Cape May County Courthouse, Cape May Court House, Middle Township; 39°05′00″N 74°49′26″W | | | 1927, Edwards & Green | | | |
| Cumberland, Cumberland County Courthouse, Bridgeton; 39°25′39″N 75°14′21″W | | | 1909, Watson & Huckel | CP: Bridgeton Historic District; SR: 1020 (1982); NR: 82001043 (1982) | | |
| Essex, Essex County Courthouse, Newark; 40°44′14″N 74°10′44″W | | | 1905, Cass Gilbert, Piccirilli Brothers | SR: 1246 (1975); NR: 75001135 (1975) | Family Court located in Gibraltar Building | |
| Gloucester, Gloucester County Courthouse, Woodbury; 39°50′19″N 75°09′12″W | | | 1885, Hazelhurst and Huckel | CP: Broad Street Historic District; SR: 1429 (1988) | Also a Gloucester County Family Court building | |
| Hudson, Hudson County Courthouse, Jersey City; 40°43′54″N 74°03′27″W | | | 1910, Hugh Roberts | SR: 1510 (1970); NR: 70000385 (1970); HABS NJ-841 | | |
| Hudson, Hudson County Administration Building, Jersey City; 40°43′57″N 74°03′29″W | | | 1953, 1964 | | | |
| Hunterdon, Hunterdon County Courthouse, Flemington; 40°30′45″N 74°51′38″W | | | 1996 | | | |
| Mercer, Mercer County Criminal Courthouse, Trenton; 40°12′55″N 74°45′48″W | | | 2013 | | | |
| Mercer, Mercer County Civil Courthouse, Trenton; 40°13′01″N 74°45′50″W | | | | | | |
| Middlesex, Middlesex County Courthouse, Civic Square, New Brunswick; 40°29′41″N 74°26′43″W | | | 1959 | | Also a Middlesex County Family Courthouse (see table below) | |
| Monmouth, Monmouth County Courthouse, Freehold; 40°15′51″N 74°16′42″W | | | 1954, James W. Mancusa | | | |
| Morris, Morris County Courthouse, Morristown; 40°47′52″N 74°29′02″W | | | 1827, Lewis Carter, Joseph M. Lindsley | SR: 2190; NR: 77000898 | | |
| Ocean, Ocean County Courthouse, Toms River; 39°57′11″N 74°11′41″W | | | 1851 | SR: NR: 83001610 | | |
| Passaic, Passaic County Court House, Paterson; 40°54′48″N 74°10′16″W | | | 1904 | | | |
| Salem, Salem County Court House, Salem; 39°34′22″N 75°27′58″W | | | 1969 | | | |
| Somerset, Somerset County Courthouse, Somerville; 40°34′06″N 74°36′37″W | | | 1907–09 | SR: 2582; NR: 89001216 | | |
| Sussex, Sussex County Judicial Center, Newton; 41°03′31″N 74°45′17″W | | | 1992 | | | |
| Union, Union County Courthouse, Elizabeth; 40°39′44″N 74°12′58″W | | | 1925–31, Albert Randolph Ross | SR: 2665 (1994); NR: 950001143 (1995) | | |
| Warren, Warren County Courthouse, Belvidere; 40°49′39″N 75°04′35″W | | | 1826, L. H. Lewis | CP: Belvidere Historic District; SR: 2747 (1978); NR: 80002525 (1981) | | |

== Historic buildings, annexes, additional and alternative courthouses ==
| County, Courthouse, Location | Image | Map | Built, Architect | SHPO; NJRHP (SR); NRHP (NR); HABS | Notes | References |
| Atlantic, Atlantic County Courthouse, Mays Landing, Hamilton Township; 39°27′07″N 74°43′34″W | | | 1838, 1916, 1978 | CP: Mays Landing Historic District; SR: 338 (1990); NR: 90001245 (1990) | Office of County Clerk | |
| Cape May, Old Cape May County Courthouse, Cape May Court House, Middle Township; 39°05′02″N 74°49′24″W | | | 1848 | SR: 1006 (1981); NR: 81000389 (1981); HABS NJ-1112 | | |
| Hunterdon, Old Hunterdon County Courthouse, Flemington; 40°30′38″N 74°51′34″W | | | 1828, Springer | CP: Flemington Historic District; SHPO: 79 (1977); SR: 1587 (1980); NR: 80002493 (1980); HABS NJ-771 | | |
| Mercer, Mercer County Courthouse, Trenton; 40°12′57″N 74°45′45″W | | | 1900–02, William Slack | | Mercer County Prosecutors Office | |
| Middlesex, Middlesex County Family Courthouse, Civic Square, New Brunswick; 40°29′33″N 74°26′50″W | | | 2000 | | | |
| Passaic, Old Passaic County Court House, Paterson; 40°54′50″N 74°10′16″W | | | 1902, Fred Wesley Wentworth (supervising architect) | CP: Passaic County Court House and United States Custom House & Post Office Historic District SR: 5441 (2015); NR: 15000443 (2015) | | |
| Passaic, Passaic County Court House Annex, Paterson; 40°54′52″N 74°10′17″W | | | 1899, Fred Wesley Wentworth | CP: Passaic County Court House and United States Custom House & Post Office Historic District SR: 5441 (2015); NR: 15000443 (2015) | | |
| Salem, Old Salem County Courthouse, Salem; 39°34′20″N 75°28′00″W | | | 1735, 1818 | CP: Market Street Historic District; SR: 2449; NR: 75001157 | 2nd oldest U.S. courthouse in continual use | |
| Sussex, Sussex County Courthouse, Newton; 41°03′32″N 74°45′13″W | | | 1765 original 1847 rebuilt | CP: Newton Town Plot Historic District; SR: 2618 (1979); NR: 79001523 (1979) | Sussex County Judicial Center | |

== See also ==
- List of counties in New Jersey
- Courts of New Jersey
- Judiciary of New Jersey
- List of United States federal courthouses in New Jersey
- List of the oldest courthouses in the United States
- List of courthouses in the United States
- Vicinage Clause

== Sources ==
- "New Jersey Courts: County Courts". State of New Jersey Department of Judiciary.
- "Counties in New Jersey". Courthouse History: New Jersey.
- "New Jersey". Emporis. Archived from the original on April 6, 2015.
- "New Jersey and National Registers of Historic Places". New Jersey Department of Environmental Protection-Historic Preservation Office.
- Deacon, John. "American Courthouses". www.courthouses.co.
