= Hudson County Administration Building =

Coordinates: 40.731722°N 74.05725°W

- View from Newark Ave
- Interactive map of the Hudson County Administration Building area

General information
- Type: Courthouse; Hall of Records; Government offices
- Location: 595 Newark Avenue; Jersey City, NJ 07306
- Construction started: 1955
- Completed: 1956 expanded 1964–66
- Opening: 1957
- Cost: $6.5million
- Owner: Hudson County

Height
- Roof: 142 ft (43 m)

Technical details
- Floor count: 10
- Lifts/elevators: 6

The Hudson County Administration Building is home to the seat of government of Hudson County, New Jersey, US. It is located at 595 Newark Avenue in the Journal Square section of Jersey City in the abutting Five Corners and Hilltop neighborhoods The building houses government administrative offices, the hall of records, and courts for the county and state. Opened in 1957 and expanded in 1966, the International Style structure is considered obsolete and will be replaced upon completion of the Frank J. Guarini Justice Complex.

== County seat ==
Hudson County was part of a much larger Bergen County until the latter was divided in 1840. By 1845, the site of a new county seat was made for the construction of a new courthouse and jail in Bergen Township, which at the time comprised much of the new county. The original courthouse was replaced by the Hudson County Courthouse in 1910. The jail was replaced in 1926 and eventually demolished in 1995. Until 1945 a major depot of an elevated streetcar line, originally operated by the North Hudson County Railway and later Public Service named Courthouse was in the immediate vicinity.

== Construction ==
Construction of the administration building, which cost $6,500,000 and planned to house 1,000 employees, began in August 1955. An annex housing the Hall of Records was part of the original construction. It was dedicated on December 18, 1957. In 1964 the international Style building was expanded to include 10 stories, When the modern new glass-and-steel tower was opened the adjacent Hudson County Courthouse was vacated and abandoned, but has subsequently been restored.

== Replacement ==
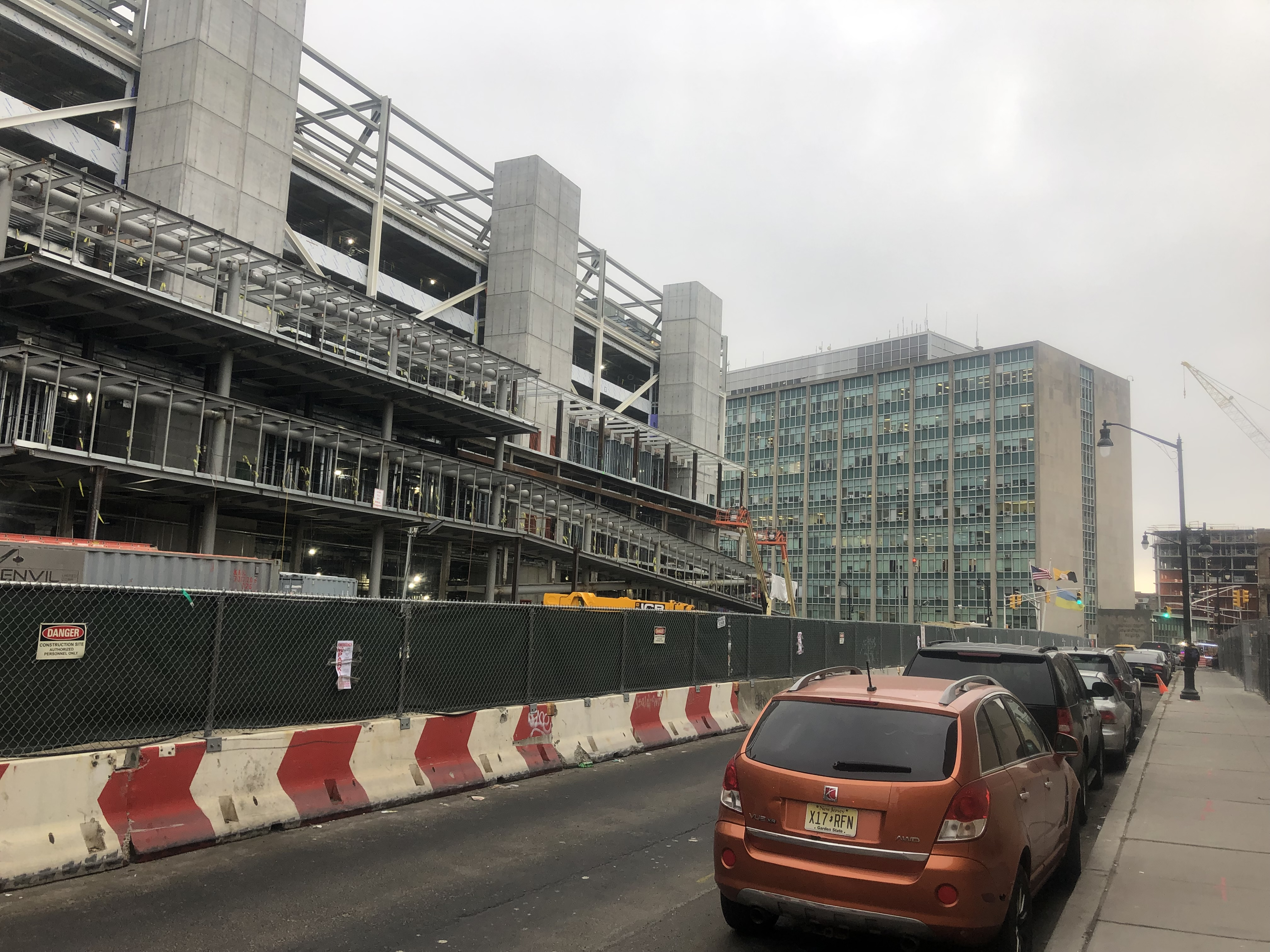
A re-aligned Central Avenue with new Frank J. Guarini Justice Complex and older Administration Building

Numerous studies since the 1980s have concluded that the administration building has long been inadequate and overburdened. In 2012, the Hudson County Board of Chosen Freeholders estimated that its replacement could cost between $291 million to $366 million. A vote to August 2012 to acquire land to do so did not pass, with members saying that a new structure could be built on unidentified county-land. Various properties, including vacant lots across Newark Avenue from the administration building have been identified as a potential site for new construction, which would include new criminal courts and companion facilities. In November and December 2013 a proposal by the Board of Chosen Freeholders to begin acquisition was tabled. Another vote to allot funds for their purchase is not expected until spring 2014, leading to complaints from judges who work at the out-of-date facility. Private developers and local neighborhood association have expressed concern of the removal of the lots from city tax rolls.

== Extension ==
The extension of Central Avenue in the immediate vicinity of the administration building is seen as part of the larger redevelopment plan for the area. In July 2012, the Board of Chosen Freeholders passed a resolution to extend a portion of the avenue between Hoboken Avenue and Newark Avenue near the potential building site. and are considering acquiring property to do so.

In December 2014 the board freeholders approved the sale of $50 million in bonds for a new courthouse. Land for the new building had been acquired by the end of 2017. In September 2018, allocations for design of the site were made and construction began in January 2021. Completion is expected in 2025.

== Courthouse Park ==
In November 2019, it was announced that the administration building will be demolished and replaced with a 3.4-acre Courthouse Park, a joint project by the city of Jersey City, which will develop it, and the county, who will maintain it after the completion of the new courthouse.

In August 2025, the Jersey City Planning Board approved a subdivision application for the property, allowing the new Courthouse Park to be built. This new park will consist of various amenities including an outdoor gym, a children's playground, a dog run, and a picnic forest. Initially, plans for the park included the transformation of the existing powerhouse building into a cafe, but those plans were not included in the approved subdivision, rather it includes it in the Courthouse's parcel.
