= Richard J. Hughes Justice Complex =

Coordinates: 40°12′48″N 74°45′50″W

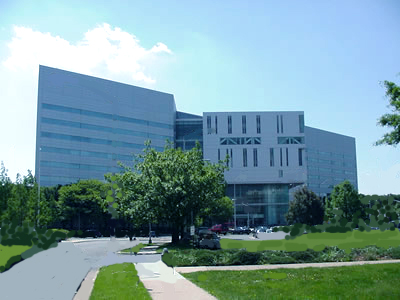
Building complex

The Richard J. Hughes Justice Complex is located in Trenton, the capital of the State of New Jersey. It is home to the New Jersey Supreme Court and other judicial and executive departments. Named in honor of Richard J. Hughes, a former Governor and Chief Justice in New Jersey, it is one several judicial centers in the city.

== New Jersey Supreme Court and government offices ==
Much of Judiciary of New Jersey is housed in the complex, including the courtroom, chambers and offices of the State Supreme Court, the courtroom and several chambers and offices of the New Jersey Superior Court, Appellate Division, and the administrative headquarters of the statewide court system.

It is also home to New Jersey Department of Law and Public Safety which is under the purview of the New Jersey Attorney General, both of which maintain their main offices there.

The New Jersey Department of the Public Advocate was based in the complex until it was eliminated in 2010 during the governorship of Chris Christie.

== Construction and architecture ==
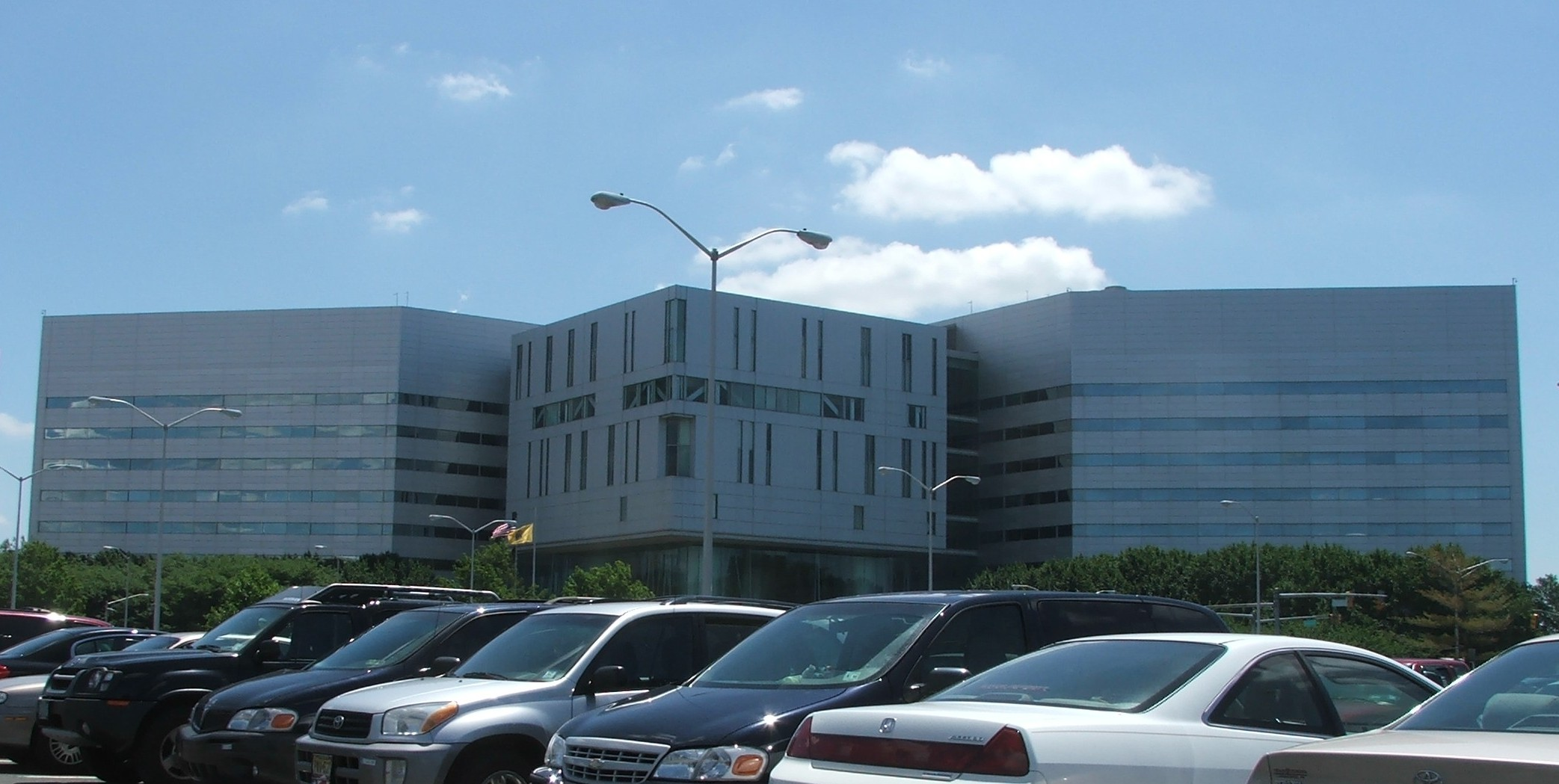

The idea for the building was originally conceived in 1976 and construction began in 1978. Grad Associates (Newark) and StudioHillier (Princeton) were involved in the design, for which they won an American Institute of Architects award. The Justice Center complex was completed in 1982. The modernist building is an 41.62 m (136.5 ft) eleven-story tall structure has approximately 1,080,000 square feet. It can be seen as three buildings in one: two eight story office building around a cube, which houses the court. Indoor bridges connect the fourth, fifth, seventh and eighth floors. The two main entrances from the street lead into the atrium lobby which is open through ten stories to a rooftop skylight. Floors 1-8 is office space, chambers, and courtrooms. Floor 9 is the mechanical penthouse, level P1 is the street level, and P2 is the parking garage. The atrium and parking facilities were renovated again after original construction.

== Dedication ==
The Justice Complex was dedicated in 1982 in honor of Richard J. Hughes (August 10, 1909 – December 7, 1992). Hughes served as the 45th Governor of New Jersey from 1962 to 1970, and as Chief Justice of the New Jersey Supreme Court from 1973 to 1979. He is the only person to have served New Jersey as both Governor and Chief Justice.

== Public art ==
Public art at the complex was commissioned through the New Jersey Percent for Art Program, fulfilling a requirement in place since 1978 that every new state building include art to the value of 1.5 percent of its construction cost.

Life-sized law-themed sculptures of clients and lawyers, by John Seward Johnson II, including Comprehension, are scattered throughout the complex.

There are three works of cast ductile iron by Beverly Pepper: Symbiotic Marker, Mute Metaphor, Primary Presence.

A 7-by-60-foot acrylic, steel, aluminum, and canvas sculptural mural by Sam Gilliam, Trenton Makes Skies Waters Spinning Wheels Red Blue, can be found in the dining room of the complex.

== Trenton courthouses ==
Trenton is also the home Clarkson S. Fisher Federal Building and United States Courthouse which serves the United States District Court for the District of New Jersey and the Mercer County Courthouse and Annex, the Mercer County Criminal Courthouse and the Mercer County Civil Courthouse

== See also ==
- County courthouses in New Jersey
- Federal courthouses in New Jersey
- Courts of New Jersey
