= New Jersey Register of Historic Places =

Heritage registers in the US by state

The New Jersey Register of Historic Places is the official list of historic resources of local, state, and national interest in the U.S. state of New Jersey. The program is administered by the New Jersey's state historic preservation office within the New Jersey Department of Environmental Protection.

The register was established under the terms of the New Jersey Register of Historic Places Act of 1970. The New Jersey Register mirrors the National Register of Historic Places, and uses the same criteria for eligibility.

== Current listings not on the National List ==
=== Gloucester County ===
See National Register of Historic Places listings in Gloucester County, New Jersey for the national list.

| | Name on the Register | Image | Date listed | Location | City or town | Description |
|---|---|---|---|---|---|---|
| 1 | Broad Street Historic District | Broad Street Historic District | 19 February 1988 (#1429) | Broad Street (between Woodbury Creek and Courtland Street) and Delaware Street (between Broad and Wood streets); 39°50′17″N 75°09′12″W | Woodbury | It includes the Gloucester County Courthouse. |

=== Hunterdon County ===
See National Register of Historic Places listings in Hunterdon County, New Jersey for the national list.

| | Name on the Register | Image | Date listed | Location | City or town | Description |
|---|---|---|---|---|---|---|
| 1 | NJ Route 165 Bridge over Swan Creek | NJ Route 165 Bridge over Swan Creek | 11 February 1999 (#3355) | Intersections of NJ Route 165 and Swan Street; 40°21′53″N 74°56′30″W | Lambertville | |
| 2 | Lilly Mansion | Lilly Mansion | 2 February 1981 (#1603) | 6 Lilly Street, Lambertville, NJ 08530; 40°21′56″N 74°56′32″W | Lambertville | Lilly Mansion was built between 1812 and 1830 for John Lilly. It is now the Lambertville Public Library. |
| 3 | People's Store | People's Store | 2 February 1981 (#1605) | 28 N Union St, Lambertville, NJ 08530; 40°13′12″N 74°33′51″W | Lambertville | Built in 1839, the building is now an antiques mall. |

=== Mercer County ===
See National Register of Historic Places listings in Mercer County, New Jersey for the national list.

| | Name on the Register | Image | Date listed | Location | City or town | Description |
|---|---|---|---|---|---|---|
| 1 | Shaky Bridge | Shaky Bridge | 24 March 2004 (#4313) | near Trenton Water Filtration Plant at the Calhoun Street Bridge; 40°13′24″N 74°46′48″W | Trenton | (spans approx. 20 feet) demonstration project from John A. Roebling. |
| 2 | Yard Avenue Historic District | | 25 April 1983 (#1809) | 40°13′13″N 74°45′16″W | Trenton | Demolished. It was petitioned to be de-certified. It is now known as Station Plaza. There was a book published in the early 80's. It is no longer listed on the map. In included an area including Carroll street, Southard Street, Yard Avenue, South Clinton Avenue, and East State Street, and was considered to be "Railroad Age". |
| 3 | Waters Edge Archaeological Complex | | 3 March 1997 (#3535) | 40°12′26″N 74°45′42″W | Trenton | HPO Opinion: 12/19/1975 Smithsonian Institution site registration designation 28-Me-268(ID#3535) It is on the site of Water's Edge residential care facility. at 512 Union Street, Trenton, New Jersey 08611 It is superseded by the Smithsonian Institution site registration designation 28Me273 |
| 4 | Benevolent Protective Order of Elks, Trenton Lodge 105 | Benevolent Protective Order of Elks, Trenton Lodge 105 | 7 March 1988 (#1792) | 120 North Warren Street, Trenton, NJ; 40°13′18″N 74°45′55″W | Trenton | Construction on the building began in 1910, was completed the following year and formally opened January 1, 1912. |
| 5 | Trenton Trust Company | Trenton Trust Company | 21 May 2008 (#4786) | 28 West State Street, Trenton, NJ; 40°13′15″N 74°46′02″W | Trenton | Built in 1928 as Trenton Trust Headquarters. In 1937, Mary Roebling, became the bank's president, making her the first woman to head a major American bank. |

=== Monmouth County ===
See National Register of Historic Places listings in Monmouth County, New Jersey for the national list.

| | Name on the Register | Image | Date listed | Location | City or town | Description |
|---|---|---|---|---|---|---|
| 1 | F&JA Masonry Arch Bridge (Applegate Creek) | | 30 June 2008 (#3633) | Freehold & Jamesburg Agricultural Railroad over Applegate Creek, MP 18.5; 40°14′35″N 74°14′59″W | Freehold Township | F&JA Masonry Arch Bridge (Applegate Creek), ID#4829 |

=== Somerset County ===
See National Register of Historic Places listings in Somerset County, New Jersey for the national list.

| | Name on the Register | Image | Date listed | Location | City or town | Description |
|---|---|---|---|---|---|---|
| 1 | Raritan Water Power Canal | Raritan Water Power Canal | 27 August 2001 (#3633) | Raritan, NJ 08869; 40°33′55″N 74°38′16″W | Raritan | Raritan Water Power Canal Historic District, ID#3633 |

== See also ==
- New Jersey Historic Trust
- New Jersey Historical Society
- National Register of Historic Places listings in New Jersey
- List of the oldest buildings in New Jersey
