= List of United States federal courthouses in New Jersey =

Following is a list of current and former courthouses of the United States federal court system located in New Jersey. Each entry indicates the name of the building along with an image, if available, its location and the jurisdiction it covers, the dates during which it was used for each such jurisdiction, and, if applicable the person for whom it was named, and the date of renaming. Dates of use will not necessarily correspond with the dates of construction or demolition of a building, as pre-existing structures may be adapted or court use, and former court buildings may later be put to other uses. Also, the official name of the building may be changed at some point after its use as a federal court building has been initiated.

== Courthouses ==
Courthouse	City	Image	Street address	Jurisdiction	Dates of use	Named for
United States Post Office and Courthouse†	Camden		401 Market Street	D.N.J.	1932–present	n/a
Mitchell H. Cohen Building & U.S. Courthouse	Camden		4th & Cooper Streets	D.N.J.	1994–present	Judge Mitchell H. Cohen
U.S. Custom House & Post Office	Newark		Government Center	D.N.J.	1896–1936; Razed in 1937	n/a
Frank R. Lautenberg Post Office & Courthouse	Newark		2 Federal Square; Government Center	D.N.J.	1936–present	U.S. Sen. Frank Lautenberg
Martin Luther King Building & U.S. Courthouse	Newark		50 Walnut Street; Government Center	D.N.J.	1992–present	Civil rights movement leader Martin Luther King Jr.
U.S. Court House & Post Office	Trenton		?	D.N.J.	1878–1932; Razed in the 1960s	n/a
Clarkson S. Fisher Federal Building and United States Courthouse†	Trenton		402 East State Street	D.N.J.	1932–present	District Court judge Clarkson Sherman Fisher

== Key ==
^{†}	Listed on the National Register of Historic Places (NRHP)
^{††}	NRHP-listed and also designated as a National Historic Landmark

== See also ==
- County courthouses in New Jersey
- Richard J. Hughes Justice Complex
