= Riverbank Park =

- U.S. National Register of Historic Places
- New Jersey Register of Historic Places
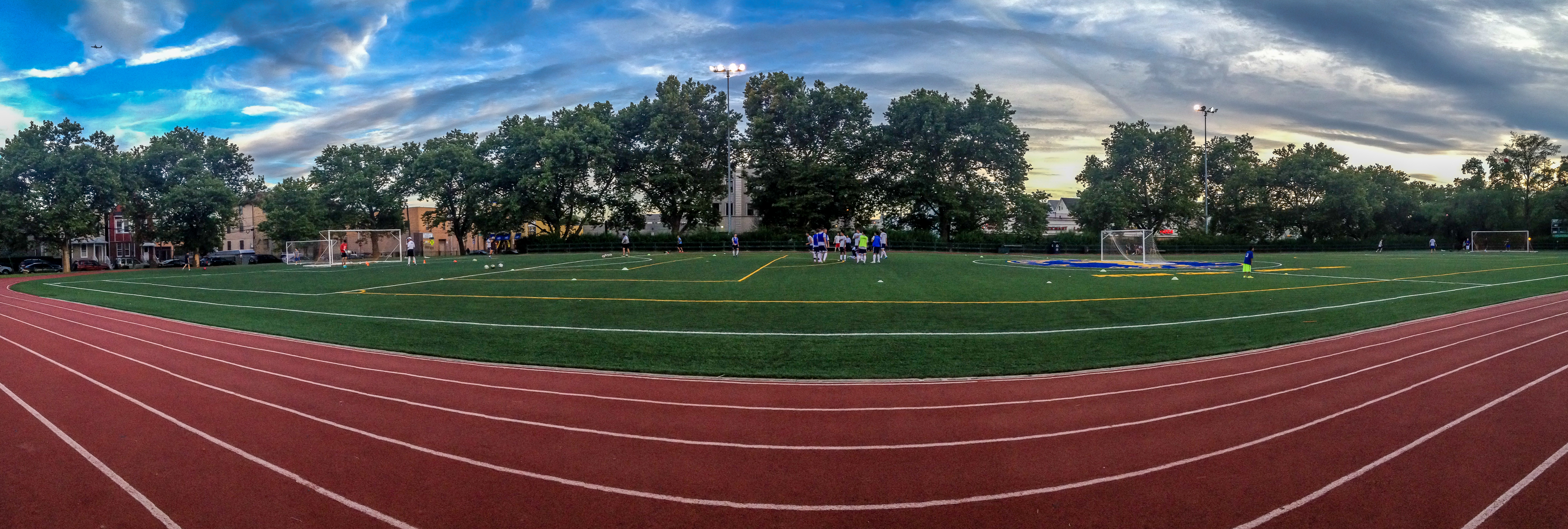
- A soccer field in Riverbank Park

- Location within Essex County, New Jersey Location within New Jersey Location within the United States
- Nearest city: Newark, New Jersey
- Coordinates: 40°43′55″N 74°9′9″W
- Area: 10.8 acres (4.4 ha)
- Built: 1907
- Architect: Olmsted Brothers
- Architectural style: Urban Park
- NRHP reference No.: 98000351
- NJRHP No.: 60

Significant dates
- Added to NRHP: April 16, 1998
- Designated NJRHP: October 29, 1999

Riverbank Park is a park in the Ironbound section of Newark, Essex County, New Jersey, United States. The park was opened in 1910 and was added to the National Register of Historic Places on April 16, 1998. It is the smallest and one of the most heavily used parks in the Essex County Park System.

== History ==
The park was designed by the Olmsted Brothers, the firm of Frederick Law Olmsted. The park land was acquired in 1907 and construction finished in 1910. A driving force behind the building of the park was Franklin Murphy (governor) who wanted his workers at the Murphy Varnish Works to have open space.

An expansion took place between 1926 and 1931. The baseball fields are on the former location of the Balbach Smelting & Refining Company, one of the largest metal processing companies in the country, which closed in the 1920s.

In 1996, there was an attempt to build the Newark Bears, Bears & Eagles Riverfront Stadium at the site of the park, demolishing the park. SPARK (Save the Park At RiverbanK) is a community group formed to save the park from destruction. After an unsuccessful attempt to save the park via referendum, they were able to protect it through inclusion in the National Historic Register.

SPARK's work also resulted in the remediation of contaminated soil, which was completed in 2003.

In August 2011, plans were announced to create Newark Riverfront Park, next door to Riverbank Park along the Passaic River which opened in August 2012. A further extension of parkland along the river was announced in June 2016. Work proceeded in 2017. Eventually it will reach Bridge Street Bridge.

== Programming ==
Currently, SPARK hosts programs in the park including a Learning Program with the New Jersey Historical Society and Greater Newark Conservancy, movie nights and Music and Art Day.

== See also ==
- Jackson Street Bridge
- Kearny Riverbank Park
- National Register of Historic Places listings in Essex County, New Jersey
