= Peter Francisco Park =

Square in Newark, New Jersey, United States

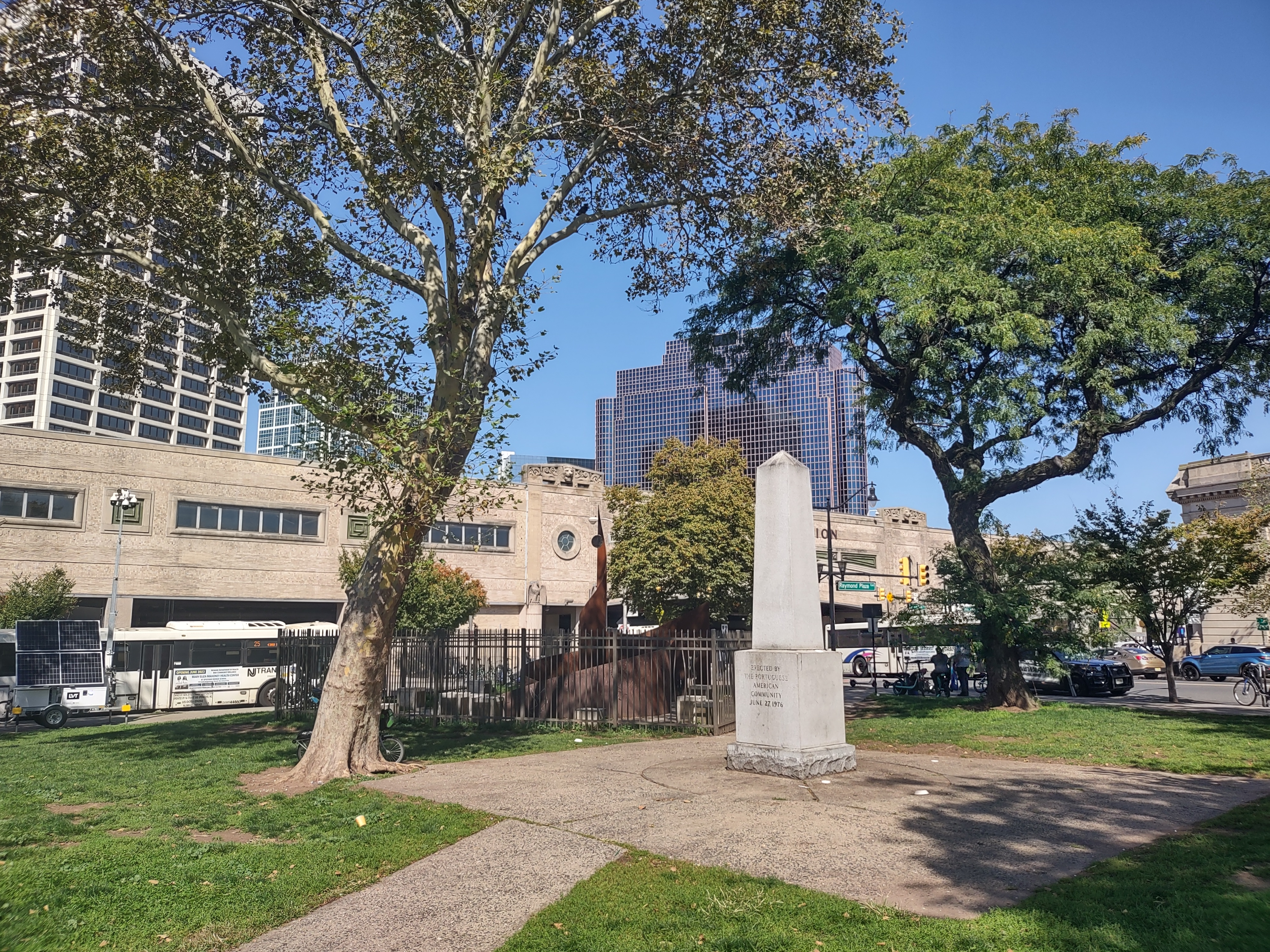

- Location within Essex County, New Jersey Location within New Jersey Location within the United States
- Location: Newark, New Jersey
- Coordinates: 40.7330505909°N 74.1642199703°W
- Area: 1 acre (0.40 ha)
- Open: 1966

Peter Francisco Park is a city square in Newark, New Jersey located adjacent to Newark Penn Station at the Five Corners in the city's Ironbound neighborhood. The park was established in 1966 by the Municipal Council of Newark.

== Description ==
The park is named for Peter Francisco (July 7, 1760 – January 16, 1831), a Portuguese-born American patriot and soldier in the American Revolutionary War. It is home to several monuments, including one to the park's namesake, which was placed in 1976 during the United States Bicentennial.

Its proximity to Penn Station has occasionally led to use of the park to provide assistance the homeless population in the area.

The park is planned to be part of a connection between Mulberry Commons and Newark Riverfront Park.

== Memorials ==
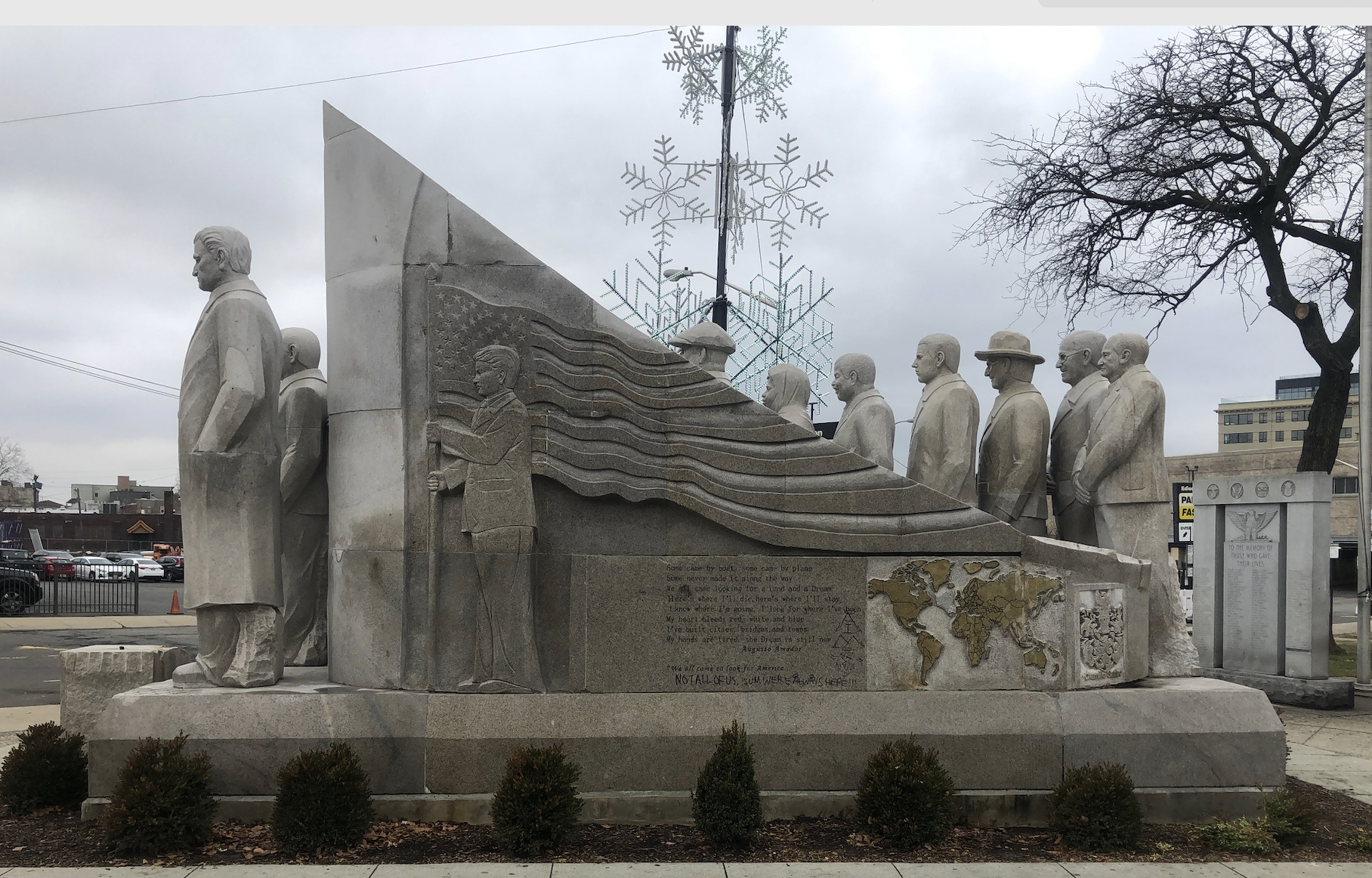
Immigrant and veterans memorials

- Peter Francisco Monument (1976) is a granite obelisk set on a shorter square granite base with two inscriptions: "In honor of Peter Francisco The Hercules of American Independence" and "Erected by the Portugues Community June 27, 1976".
- Ironbound Immigrants Memorial Monument (2018) is a granite sculpture dedicated to the immigrant populations who have lived in the Ironbound.
- War Memorial (1974) is granite stele "dedicated to the memory of those who gave their lives".

== See also ==
- List of public art in Newark, New Jersey
- History of Lusophone Americans in Newark, New Jersey
