= Newark Riverfront Park =

Park in Newark, New Jersey, United States

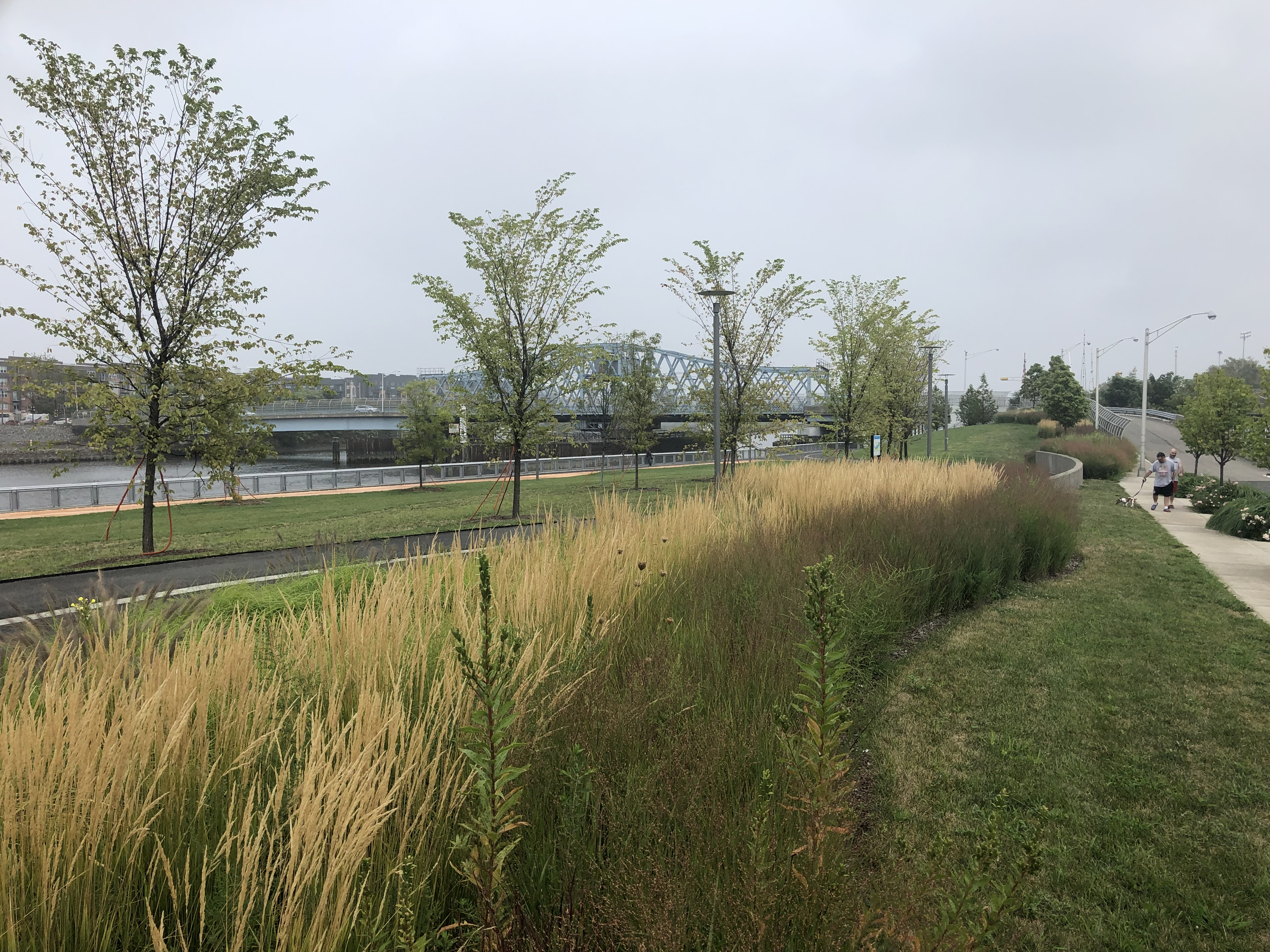
- Looking southeast to Jackson Street Bridge
- Interactive map of Newark Riverfront Park
- Type: Urban park
- Location: Newark, New Jersey, United States
- Coordinates: 40.7333°N 74.1478°W
- Opened: 2012
- Designer: Hector Urban Design, Mott MacDonald, Weintraub Diaz, James Corner, among others
- Operator: Essex County Department of Parks, Recreation and Cultural Affairs, City of Newark

Newark Riverfront Park is a park and promenade being developed in phases along the Passaic River in Newark, New Jersey, United States. It is part of the Essex County Park System. The park, expected to be 3 miles (4.8 km) long and encompass 30.5 acres (12.3 ha), is being created from brownfield and greyfield sites along the river, which itself is a Superfund site due to decades of pollution. It will follow the river between the Ironbound section along Raymond Boulevard and Downtown Newark along McCarter Highway to the Bridge Street Bridge. Announced in 1999, a groundbreaking took place in 2008, and the first phase of the park opened in 2012. It was the first time residents of the largest city in New Jersey have ever had public access to the river. Other segments of the park have subsequently opened, while others are being developed. The East Coast Greenway uses paths and roads along the park.

== History ==
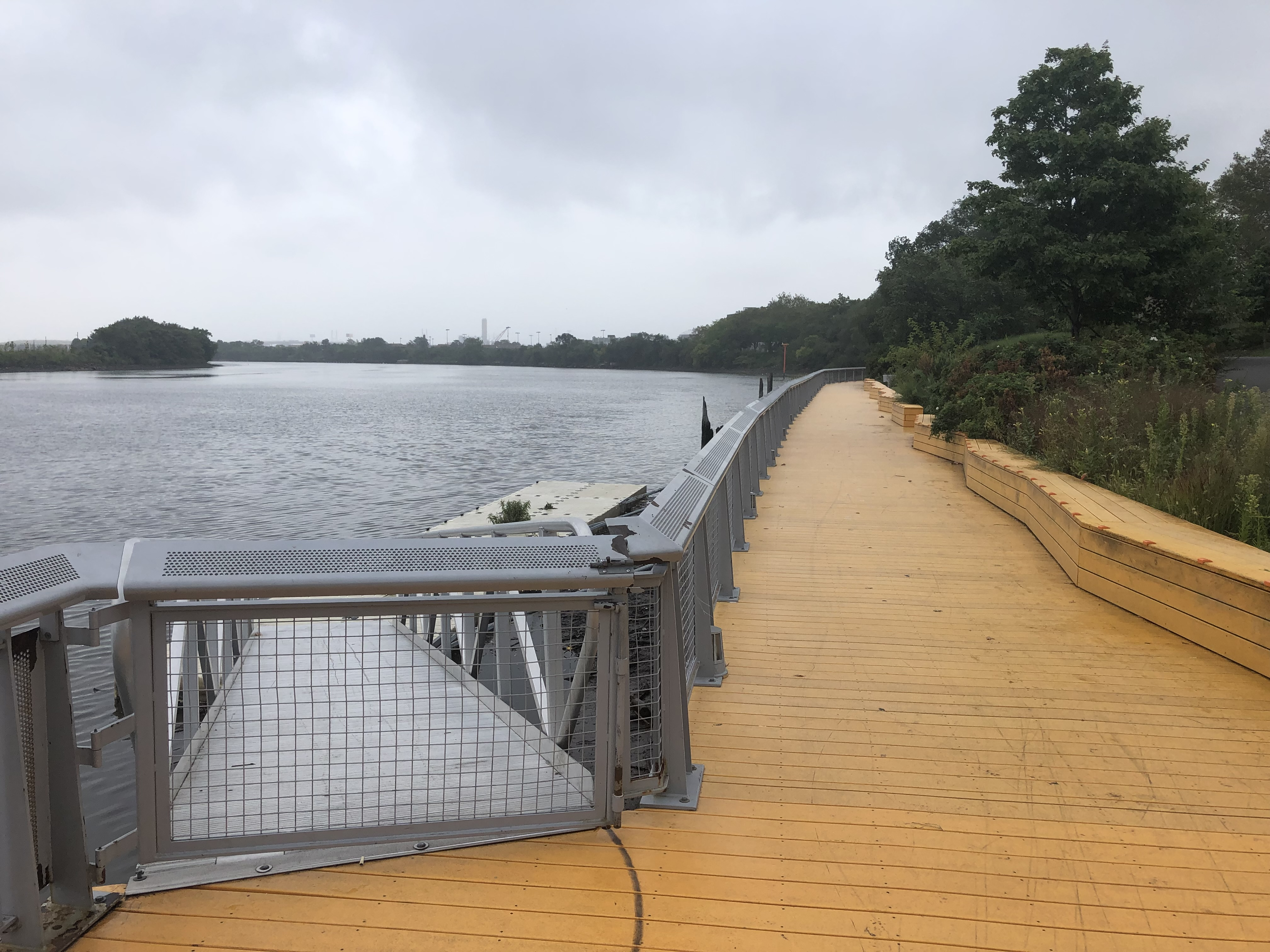
The Orange Boardwalk

The banks of Passaic River had been industrialized, and in some sections later abandoned for many years, and is an EPA Superfund site. Diamond Alkali in the Ironbound section, was a notable contributor to the contamination through its production of Agent Orange and other pesticides. The river's remediation, projected in 2014 to cost an estimated $1.7 billion, is to be one of the largest Superfund cleanups ever proposed. While plans for dredging the river to remove contaminants has been planned for many years, it was only more recently that this has been seen as an urban planning opportunity to increase community parks and access to the river itself. Connecting environmental conservation and restoration with intentional park development is a relatively new way to invest in new park infrastructure, as evidenced in increasing research in this area.

The United States Army Corps of Engineers has restored much of the shore along the banks of the river in Newark. The project included 6,000 feet (1,800 m) of bulkhead re-construction, and 3,200 feet (980 m) of riverbank grading and native plantings.

The park, originally announced in 1999 with a ground breaking taking place in 2008, is being developed through a partnership with the City of Newark, The Trust for Public Land, the Newark Community Economic Development Corporation, and the Essex County Department of Parks. In its initial stages it was called the Joseph G. Minish Passaic River Waterfront and Historic Area in honor of Joseph Minish.

The first phase which parallels Raymond Boulevard, encompasses 12 acres and opened in 2012. Designed by Mott MacDonald, it includes playgrounds, fields for soccer and baseball, a boardwalk, and walking trails. This gave members of the community their first public access to the river in over a century. It was initially known as Essex County Riverfront Park, it is part of the Essex County Park System.

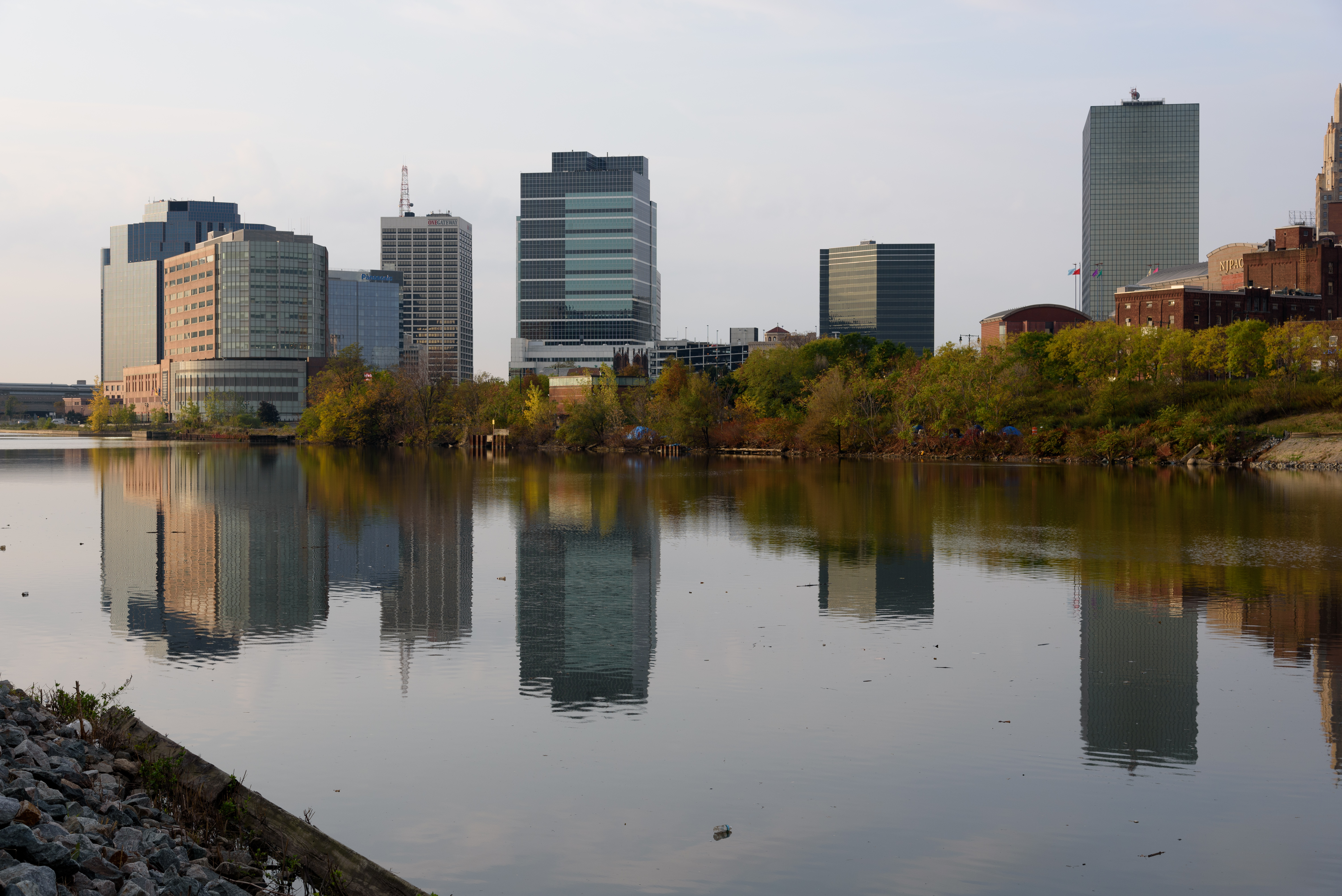
The Passaic Riverfront between Dock Bridge and NJPAC, called the Notch.

Phase 2, adjacent to the existing Riverbank Park downstream of the Jackson Street Bridge, opened in 2013 with it one of the more prominent visual elements of the park, a fluorescent orange boardwalk with large orange poles, viewable from trains on the Northeast Corridor downstream of Newark Penn Station.

Phase 3, upstream of Jackson Street Bridge, opened in December 2017, with a ceremony from Newark's Mayor Ras J. Baraka. This four-acre section includes walking and bike paths, river overlooks, open exercise equipment in a fitness zone, seating, lighting, and flood resilience features.

Ground was broken on phase C of the park in October 2017. It was designed by James Corner. The parcels along McCarter Highway are north of Dock Bridge and Newark Penn Station upstream to the New Jersey Performing Arts Center (NJPAC). Land adjacent to the park is zoned for mixed-use development.

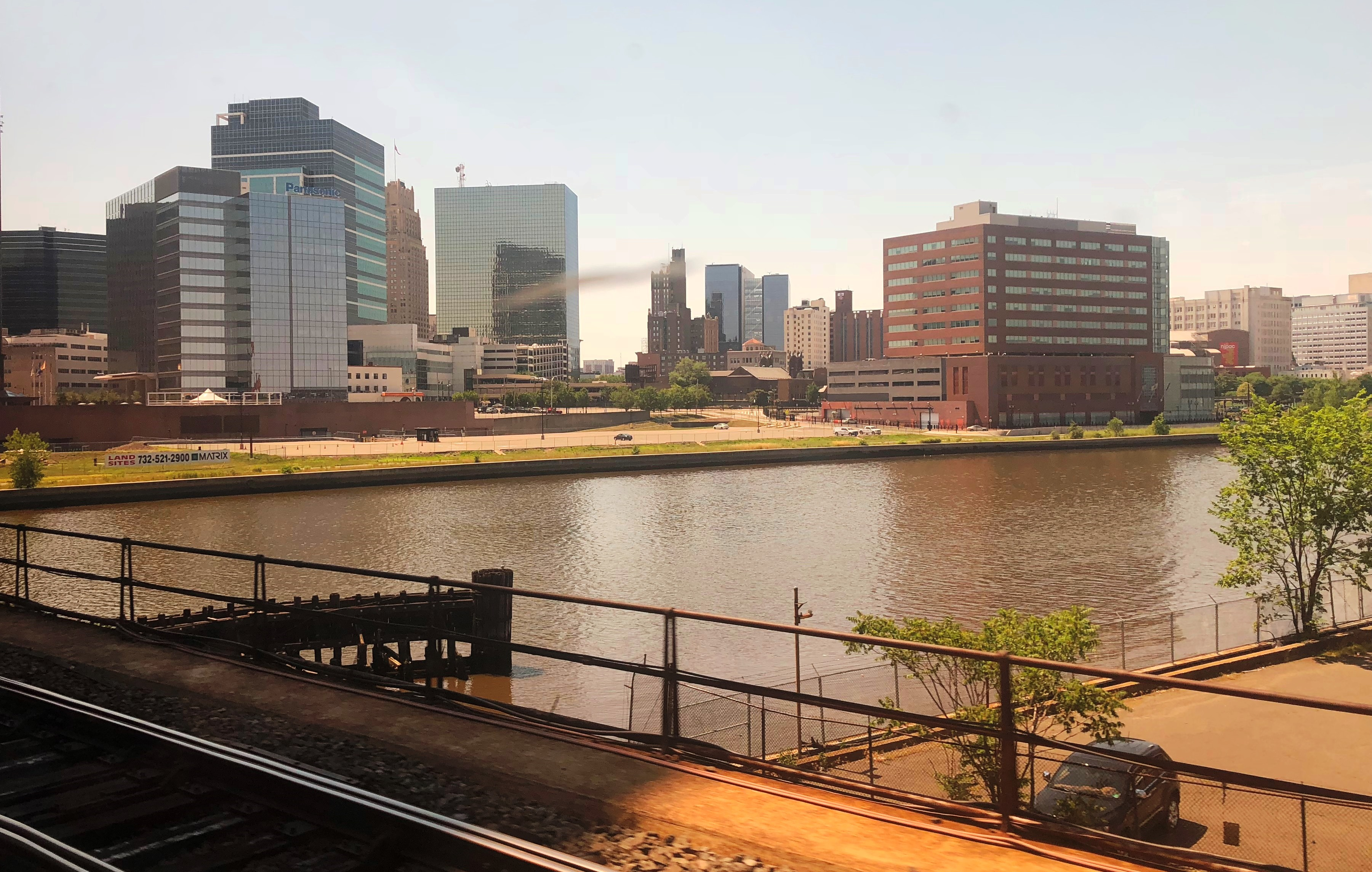
North of Newark Penn Station

== See also ==
- Mulberry Commons, a new city square downtown
- Kearny Riverbank Park
