= The Ironbound =

Neighborhood of Newark, New Jersey, US

Coordinates: 40°43′30″N 74°09′40″W

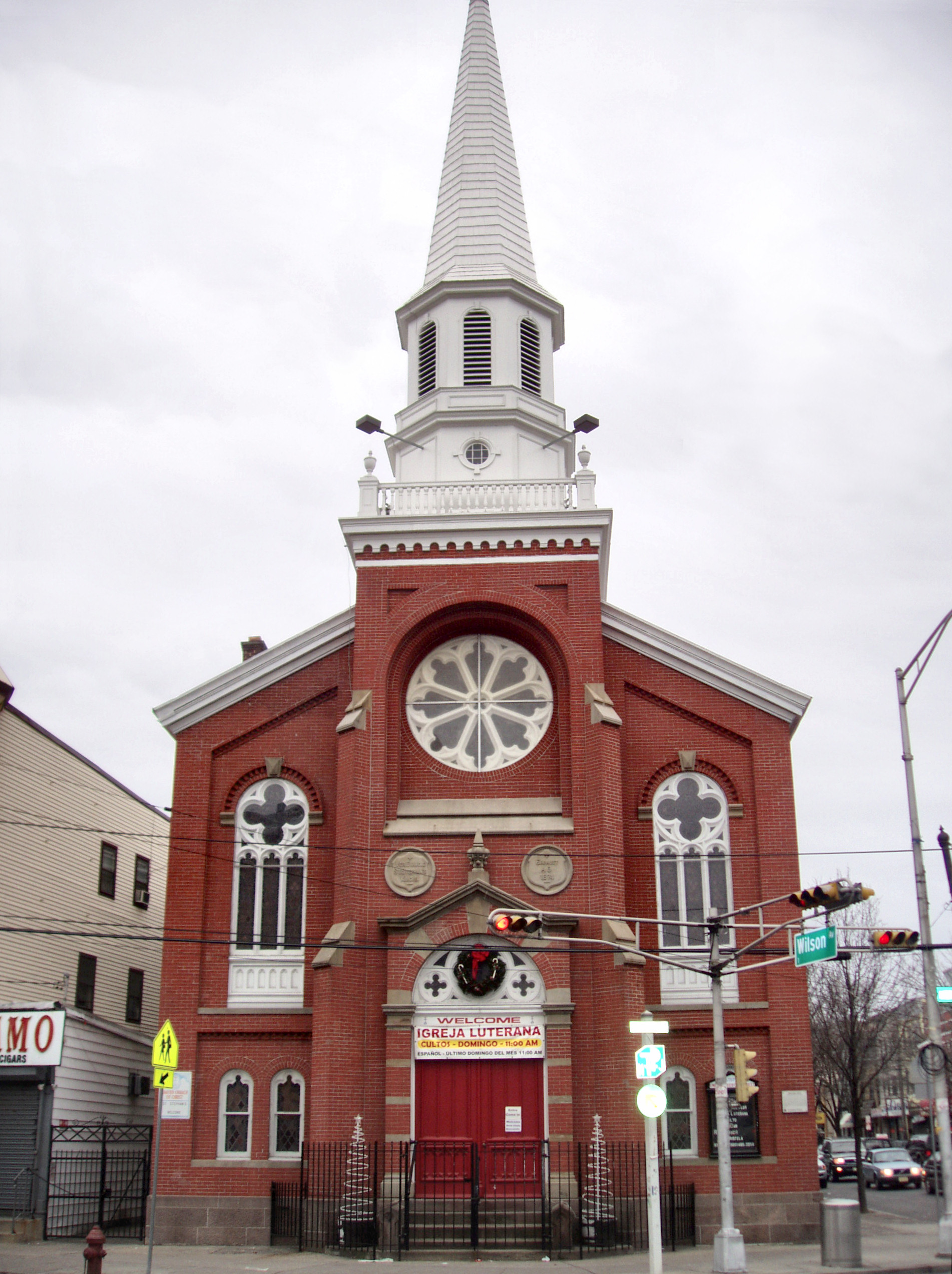
St. Stephan's Church is an Ironbound landmark, built in 1874.

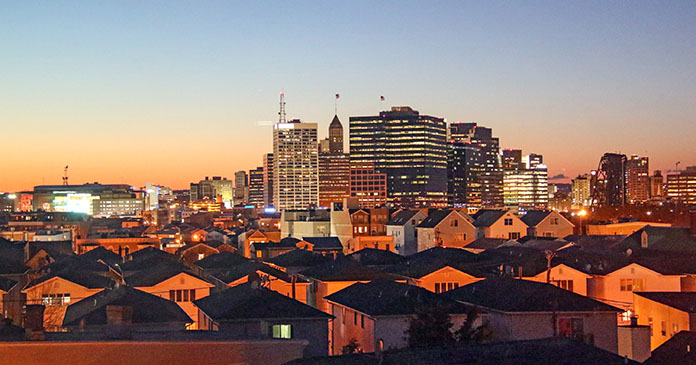
Ironbound Views of the Newark Skyline

The Ironbound (Note: Often referred to with a definite article, e.g., The Ironbound.) is a neighborhood in the city of Newark in Essex County, in the U.S. state of New Jersey. It is a large working-class multi-ethnic community, covering about 4 square miles (10 km^{2}). Historically, the area was called "Dutch Neck", "Down Neck", or simply "the Neck", for its location by a bend of the Passaic River. Part of Newark's East Ward, the Ironbound is directly east of Newark Penn Station and Downtown Newark, and south and west of the river. The neighborhood is connected by the Jackson Street Bridge over the river to Harrison and Kearny.

== Early history ==
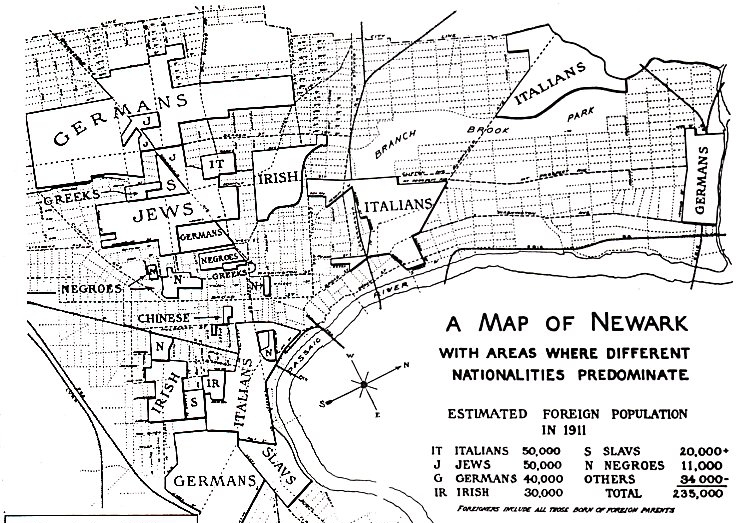
1910-era map of ethnic enclaves in Newark, New Jersey

The area was mostly farmland until the 1830s, when industry and immigration began increasing at a rapid pace.

The name "The Ironbound" is said to derive from the large metalworking industry in the area or from the network of railroad tracks that surrounded the neighborhood.

=== Industry ===
The Ironbound was an industrial neighborhood in the 19th and early 20th centuries. The neighborhood was home to Hensler's Beer Brewery, P. Ballantine and Sons Brewing Company (in 1954 Newark's largest employer) and the Feigenspan Brewery. Balbach Smelting & Refining Company, now the location of Riverbank Park, was the second largest metal processing enterprise in the United States until its closure in the 1920s. Other large industrial buildings included Murphy Varnish Works.

=== Immigration ===
The Ironbound has experienced several waves of immigration. The first wave, starting in the 1830s, came from the German states. Wrote historian Charles Cummings, "Overnight, whole sections of the Ironbound became Irish and German". Polish and Italian immigrants arrived in the latter half of the 19th century, followed by Portuguese and Spanish starting in the 1910s. By 1921 there was a large enough Portuguese population to found Sport Club Portuguese, the first of over twenty Portuguese social clubs that would call the Ironbound home.

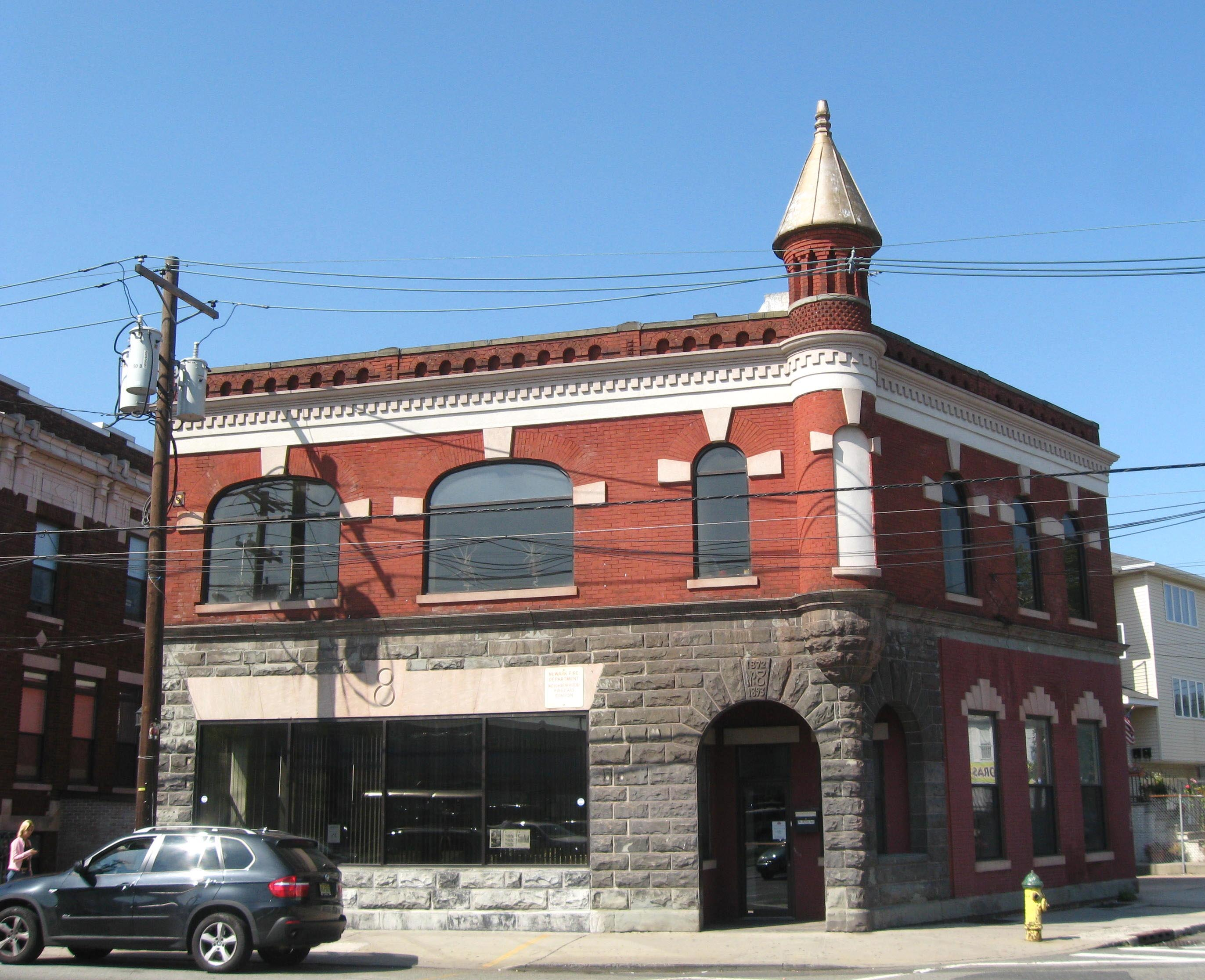
Former Firehouse 8 on Ferry Street

=== Historical landmarks ===
The following sites in the Ironbound are on the National Register of Historic Places:

- Murphy Varnish Works
- Pennsylvania Station (Newark)
- Riverbank Park
- St. Casimir's Roman Catholic Church (Newark, New Jersey)
- St. Stephan's Church (Ironbound, Newark, New Jersey)

== Culture and commerce ==
Ferry Street is the main commercial strip in the area. In 2017, the New York Times described the neighborhood as:

Four square miles populated in large part by Portuguese, Spanish and Latin American immigrants and their descendants, the Ironbound has the intimacy and hustle of a European market town. “We walk to the bakery, the fishmonger, the wine store,” said [the director of the Newark Museum of Art]. (He also walks to work.) “It really is an extraordinarily agreeable lifestyle.”

=== Portuguese community ===
The Ironbound is known for being a Portuguese neighborhood. TAP Air Portugal has its corporate office in the neighborhood. Ironbound Volunteer Ambulance Squad has been serving the community since 1952. Ironbound also has its own newspaper. Many Portuguese still live in the Ironbound, but many are moving out to other neighborhoods in New Jersey, Including South River, Livingston, Clark, Westfield, Watchung, Old Bridge, etc.

==== Peter Francisco Park ====
A small sitting park east of Penn Station is named in honor of Peter Francisco, a Portuguese-born patriot of the American War of Independence. An obelisk in Francisco's memory was raised in the park by the Portuguese community in 1976. Peter Francisco Park also features a memorial to Portuguese-American war veterans dedicated in 2018 as well as the Ironbound Immigrants Memorial, dedicated in 2019.

== Festivals ==
=== Portugal Day festival ===
The neighborhood holds the annual Portuguese Parade & Festival, known as Portugal Day, in early June

During Portugal Day Weekend, many people come out to celebrate Portuguese-American culture. Ferry Street is also the location for most soccer fans to come and celebrate. Fans walk up and down the street while others decorate their cars and celebrate the victory of their soccer team.

=== Ecuadorian Day festival ===
Typically held in the first or second weekend of August, the Ecuadorian Day Parade & festival take place in Ferry Street. In this event various businesses and politicians attend the parade and support the Ecuadorian culture in a statewide recognized festivity.

=== Brazilian Day festival ===
Typically held in the first or second weekend of September, the Brazilian day festival takes place also in Ferry Street. Various street vendors, musical concerts, and restaurants show support for Brazilian culture.

=== Italian festival ===
Our Lady of Mt. Carmel, the Ironbound's first Italian parish, holds an annual Italian festival.

== Demographics ==
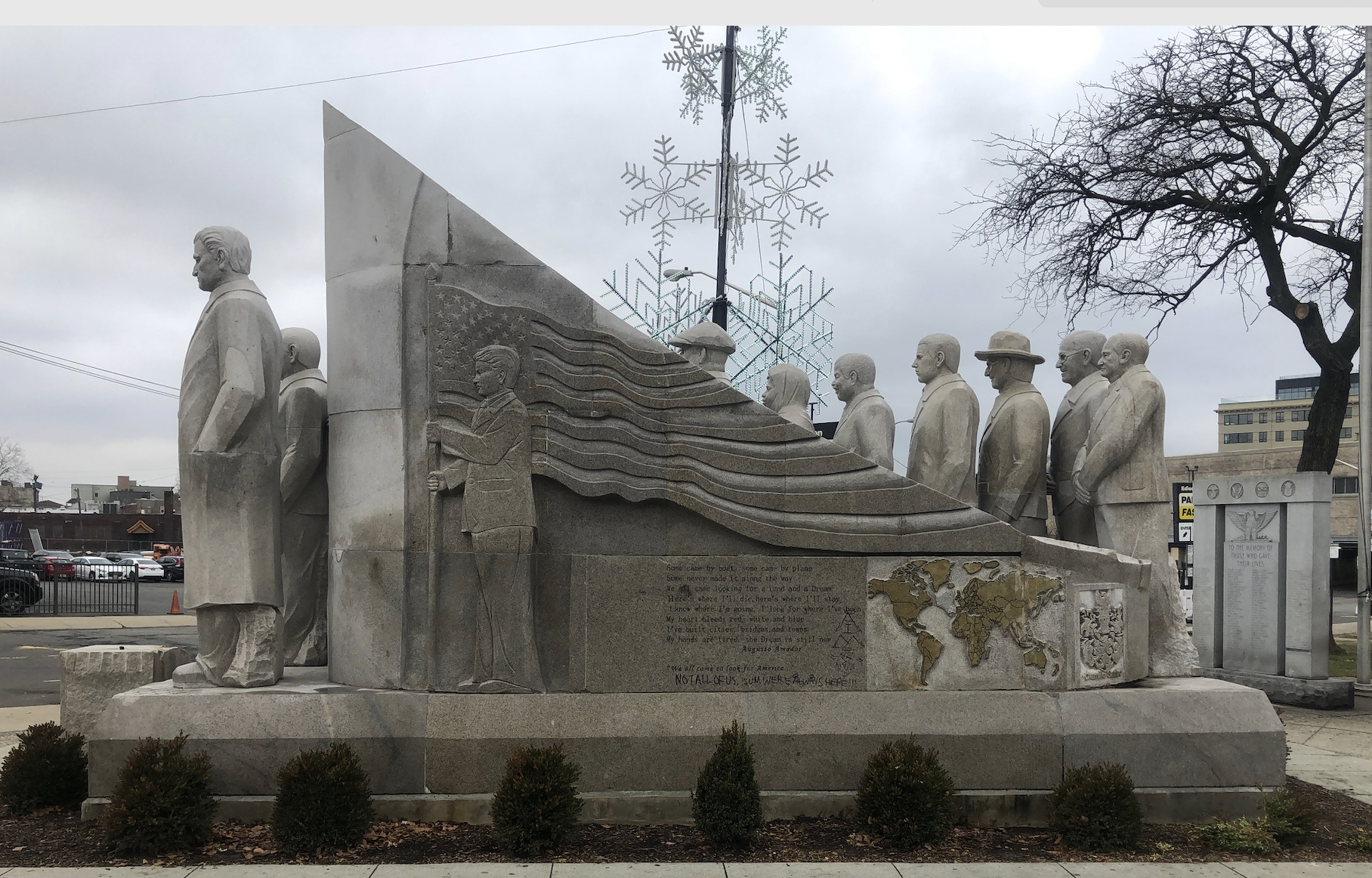
The Ironbound Immigrants Memorial (2018) in Peter Francisco Park in the westernmost area the Ironbound section outside Newark Penn Station.

The Ironbound used to mainly consist of Italians, Polish, Portuguese, and Spaniard Immigrants. As time went on many Italian and Polish immigrants have moved out of the Ironbound. However, there are still significant numbers of residents of Italian and Polish descent residing in the Ironbound. Recent immigrants include large numbers of Brazilians and Ecuadorians. 2000s census demographics include:

57.46% White/Caucasian/European (Mainly consisting of Italian, Spanish, Polish, and other European Ethnicity)

34.94% Hispanic & Latino (Mainly consisting of Ecuadorians, Etc.)

0.95% Asian/American Indian

4.68% Black/African American

1.97% Multi-Racial

== Parks and recreation ==
=== Independence Park ===
This park is in the Ironbound district. Our Lady of Mt. Carmel, the Ironbound's first Italian parish, faces the park. The church holds an annual Italian festival which attracts Italian-American people that live in the neighborhood, and Italians who moved out of the Ironbound.

=== Riverfront Park and waterfront ===
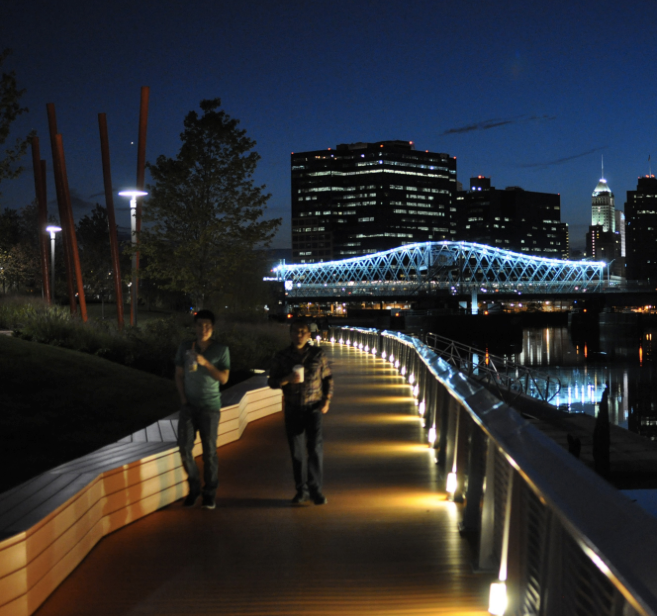
Orange Boardwalk and Jackson Street Bridge

A chain of parkland along the Passaic River, especially along the downward "curve" in the river that gave the Ironbound neighborhood its nickname of "Down Neck," offers waterfront recreation in the city. Kayaking and riverboat tours of the city are offered in the summer months. From east to west along the downward "neck" of the Passaic, parkland includes:

- Riverfront Park, which stretches along the Passaic River offering the "Orange Boardwalk" walkway paths with views of the water. Sports Illustrated Stadium may be seen looking north across the river to the Harrison bank.
- Riverbank Park in the Ironbound along the Passaic River.
- Peter Francisco Park is a small park near Penn Station in honor of the Portuguese-born Revolution-era patriot.

== Education ==
=== Public schools ===
The Newark Public Schools operates six elementary and K-8 schools in the area. Schools serving Ironbound include Wilson Avenue School, Hawkins Street School, Lafayette Street School and Oliver Street School. In addition is Ann Street School, which is considered by many to be one of the best elementary schools in the city and the K-5 South Street School. In fact, Ann Street School received the Blue Ribbon School of Excellence from the US Department of Education. This competitive award had not been awarded to a Newark Public School before. In addition, the award prompted then Vice President of the US, Al Gore, to visit Ann Street to promote the importance of the upcoming 2000 US Census. East Side High School serves Ironbound high school students. As of 2004 most of the elementary schools were built over 100 years prior to the time. In the 2000s, an increase in housing lead to an overcrowding of Ironbound-area schools. At the time the school district planned to replace several of the elementary schools and build a new East Side High School in the former Ballantine brewery site.

=== Private schools ===
The Roman Catholic Archdiocese of Newark operates the Ironbound Catholic Academy, a PK-8 school in Ironbound. As of 2004 many residents of Ironbound send their children to parochial schools. Ironbound used to have three other Catholic elementary schools, including Academy of St. Benedict, a PreK-8 school, St. James, both elementary and high school, and St. Lucy Filippini Academy. In 2005 the archdiocese announced that St. Casimir, St. Benedict, and St. Lucy Filippini would merge into the Ironbound Catholic Academy on the St. Casimir site. There is also the Our Lady of Fatima Nursery, a Pre-K institution and one Portuguese Language School known at Escola Luis de Camões.

=== Public libraries ===
Newark Public Library's Van Buren Branch Library serves the Ironbound neighborhood. The library opened on September 23, 1923. A renovated and expanded branch opened on November 19, 1997.

== Housing ==
About 60% of the real estate market in the Ironbound is two- and three-family houses. Many houses built by the Portuguese include tile details and aluminum siding. In the past ten to fifteen years, more luxury condos and apartments have been built in the area. Several old factory buildings have been converted into lofts or apartments including Textile Lofts, Button Factory Lofts, Murphy Varnish Factory, and the Chocolate Factory.

Ironbound has three housing projects within its boundaries: Hyatt Court, Pennington Court, and Terrell Homes (formerly Franklin Delano Roosevelt Homes). Tenants and activists have recently been in a battle with the Newark Housing Authority to save Terrell Homes, which the Authority had planned to demolish.

== Environmental justice ==
The Ironbound has a "national reputation" for being a leader in environmental justice led by a local community organizing and advocacy organization called the Ironbound Community Corporation (ICC) and an offshoot group the Ironbound Committee Against Toxic Waste (ICATW). ICC and ICATW have worked over the years with other local and national groups and figures such as Greenpeace, Lois Gibbs, and the Newark Coalition for Neighborhoods. Over the years they have worked on a number of environmental justice issues including airplane noise, dioxin, pollution and fumes.

In 1983, dangerous levels of dioxin were discovered at an abandoned chemical factory in the Ironbound. The Diamond Alkali Company was largely responsible for this pollution through their heavy production of Agent Orange between 1951 and 1969. The off-site cleanup was completed by 1986, and in 1989 the site received a permanent impermeable cap.

In the 1980s residents protested against a garbage incinerator in the neighborhood. The incinerator was built in 1990 but residents have continued to protest environmental issues over the years. Bright pink and purple fumes were often seen spewing from the facility but Covanta, the company operating the incinerator, blamed a local hospital for improperly disposed medical waste. In summer 2019, ICC partnered with Earthjustice, a nonprofit public interest organization that litigates to protect the environment, and the Environmental Advocacy Clinic at Vermont Law School urged state officials to investigate. Covanta has been found many hundreds of times to exceed air pollution limits or to fail to abide by required safety regulations. Covanta eventually acknowledged that the fumes were produced by its burning of pesticides improperly disposed and agreed to new waste management procedures.

== Notable residents ==
- Playwright Richard Wesley grew up near Terrell Homes in the Ironbound and graduated from East Side High School (Newark, New Jersey)
- 1922 Olympic Gold medalist Camille Sabie lived on Jefferson Street in the Ironbound
- Statesman and Supreme Court justice Charles Evans Hughes lived on Elm Street as a child
- Politician Peter Angelo Cavicchia lived on Jefferson Street
- Film inventor Hannibal Goodwin lived for a time on Ferry St
- James Moody (saxophonist) graduated East Side High School (Newark, New Jersey)
- Saxophonist, innovative jazz composer, bandleader Wayne Shorter grew up in the Ironbound.
- Randy Foye, former NBA player graduated East Side High School (Newark, New Jersey).
- Popular singer and recording artist Connie Francis, was born on Dec. 12, 1937, (as Concetta Franconero) in Newark and grew up in the Ironbound neighborhood.

== Popular culture ==
- The early scenes of Alfred Hitchcock's 1943 thriller Shadow of a Doubt were shot in several places in Newark, including the Ironbound.
- The third track on Suzanne Vega's 1987 album Solitude Standing, "Ironbound/Fancy Poultry", has lyrics describing a scene set in the neighborhood.
- New Jersey metal band Overkill released their 15th album titled Ironbound in 2010. Much of the album's lyrical theme, especially the title track, is built around the topic of the area and its people.
- Scenes from the 2005 Steven Spielberg film War of the Worlds were filmed in the Ironbound
- The HBO TV series "The Sopranos", the seventh episode of season 1 (titled Down Neck), establishes that Ironbound is the neighborhood where protagonist Tony Soprano grew up.

== See also ==
- Newark Ironbound Express
- Newark Riverfront Park
