= Diamond Alkali =

American chemical company

Diamond Alkali Company
- Industry: Chemicals, materials
- Founded: March 21, 1910; 116 years ago
- Founders: Thomas Raymond Evans; Howard S. Evans
- Defunct: December 1, 1967; 58 years ago
- Fate: Merged into Diamond Shamrock
- Headquarters: Cleveland, Ohio, United States

Diamond Alkali Company was an American chemical company incorporated in 1910 in West Virginia by a group of glass industry businessmen from Pittsburgh. The company soon established a large chemical plant in Lake County, Ohio, which would operate for over sixty years. In 1947, the headquarters of the company was moved from Pittsburgh to Cleveland. Later the company established a plant in Redwood City, California, that produced ion-exchange resins. In 1967, Diamond Alkali and Shamrock Oil and Gas merged to form the Diamond Shamrock Corporation. Diamond Shamrock would go on to merge with Ultramar Corporation, and the combined company, Ultramar Diamond Shamrock Corporation, would in turn be acquired by Valero Energy Corporation in 2001.

== Environmental contamination ==
=== Newark, New Jersey ===
Diamond Alkali was largely responsible for contamination leading to the creation of a Superfund site in the Ironbound section of Newark, New Jersey. Between 1951 and 1969, Diamond Alkali in Newark produced approximately 700,000 US gallons (2,600,000 L; 580,000 imp gal) of the herbicide Agent Orange. The plant had a reputation for accidents and producing the lowest quality (most contaminated with by-products) herbicides. Furthermore, the firm dumped chemical waste in the Passaic River. The former plant property and adjoining portions of the Lower Passaic River were declared a Superfund site in 1984. In 1986, the Diamond Shamrock Corporation agreed to pay $150,000 for a canvas tarpaulin to cover 3 acres (12,000 m^{2}) of the contaminated area. Remediation efforts at Diamond Alkali began in 2000 and ecological investigation, dredging, and other cleanup activities are still underway. As of 2020 the EPA indicates that the site is not yet ready for reuse and redevelopment.

=== Painesville, Ohio ===
The Diamond Shamrock Corp. (Painesville Works) site is an 1,100-acre former chemical manufacturing facility in Painesville, Painesville Township, and Fairport Harbor in Lake County, Ohio. The Diamond Shamrock Painesville Works facility operated from 1912 through 1976. It made a variety of products, including soda ash, baking soda, chromium compounds, carbon tetrachloride, hydrochloric and sulfuric acids, chlorinated wax and coke. Facility operations contaminated soil, sediment and surface water with hazardous chemicals. Site cleanup is ongoing.

The cleanup at the site has been divided into 22 portions, also known as Operable Units. U.S. EPA is the lead agency for Operable Unit #16, only one of the 22 Operable Units that comprise the overall Site. The source of pollution in Operable Unit #16 is waste from chromate ore processing placed at the site. Operable Unit #16 was proposed for the National Priorities List but was never added to the list. U.S. EPA will withdraw the Proposal to the NPL for O.U. #16 and transfer all cleanup supervision authority to Ohio EPA. Ohio EPA is directing the cleanup at all the other Operable Units that comprise the Site.

In 1982, Diamond Shamrock completed closure of the area designated as Operable Unit #16. However, the presence of chromate wastes in the landfill cell made it necessary to continue long term monitoring, inspection, and reporting for this area. The closure consisted of installing sheet piling along the Grand River and an impermeable clay cap placed over all the waste areas. U.S. EPA issued a legal order, known as an Administrative Consent Order, in 1983 under the RCRA program to ensure that monitoring continued in the long term.

In 2001, U.S. EPA performed a limited cleanup action. In 2006, the potentially responsible parties upgraded and repaired the clay cap at Operable Unit #16, and improved some of the drainage at and around the site. Groundwater sampling is conducted every two years. The site is currently being addressed by a potentially responsible party under Ohio EPA oversight.

Sheet piling has been installed to control the seeps. Extraction wells behind (upgradient from) the sheet piling extract the contaminated groundwater and prevent overtopping of the sheet piling. Seeps have not been observed since this system was put in place in early 2006. Site cleanup continues under the direction of Ohio EPA.

== See also ==
- Newark Riverfront Park
