= Jackson Street Bridge =

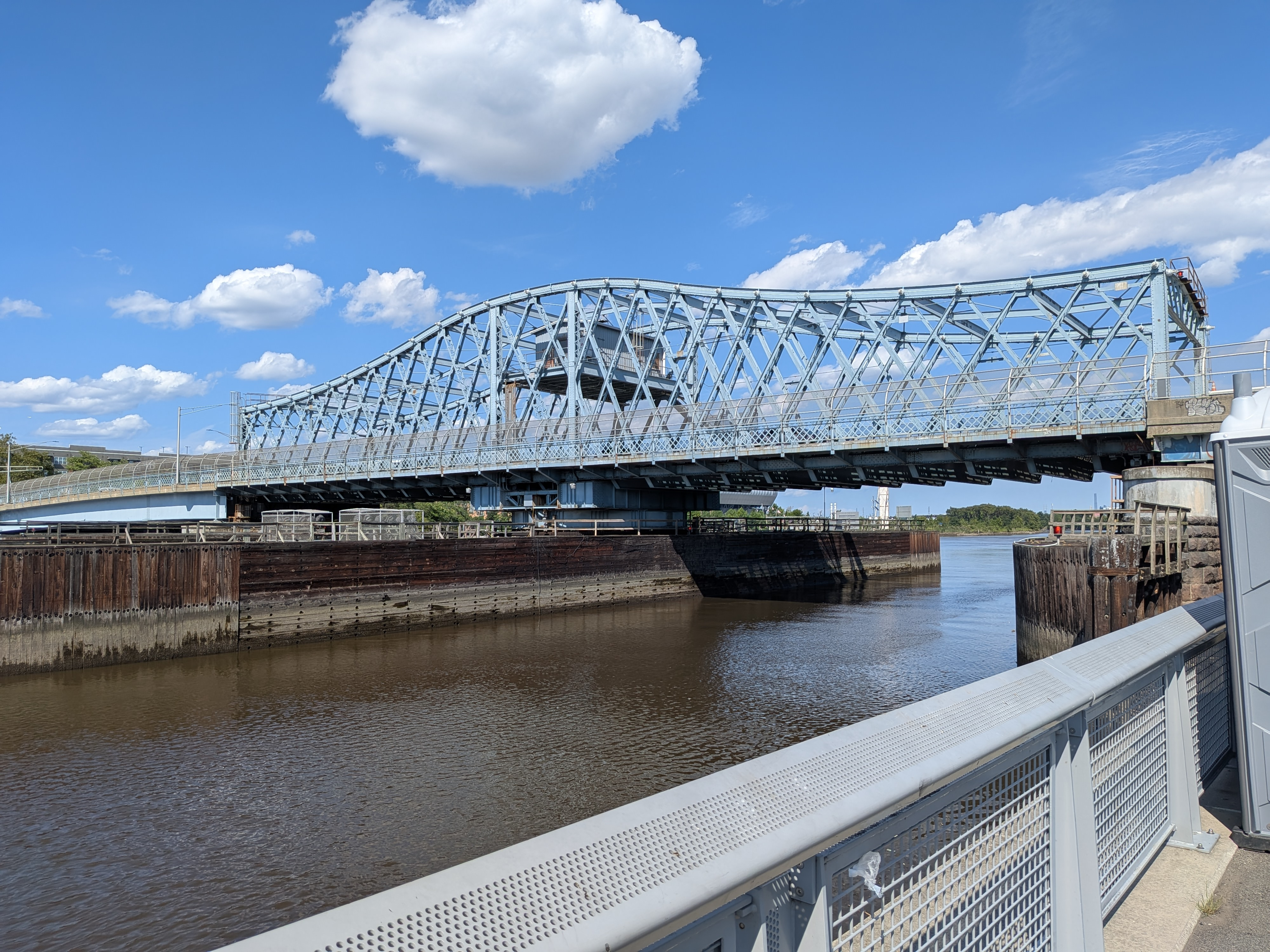
- Coordinates: 40°44′01″N 74°09′19″W
- Carries: Jackson Street & F. E. Rodgers Blvd
- Crosses: Passaic River; Raymond Boulevard
- Locale: Newark and Harrison, Northeastern New Jersey
- Owner: City of Newark
- ID number: 0700H01

Characteristics
- Design: Swing bridge
- Total length: 466.9 feet (142.3 m)
- Width: 40.4 feet (12.3 m)
- Longest span: 171.9 feet (52.4 m)
- No. of spans: 2
- Clearance above: 16.7 feet (5.1 m)
- Clearance below: 15.1 feet (4.6 m) (low tide)

History
- Designer: J. Owen
- Engineering design by: McCann Fagan Iron Works
- Construction start: 1897
- Opened: 1903

Location
- Interactive map of Jackson Street Bridge

The Jackson Street Bridge is a bridge on the Passaic River between Newark and Harrison, New Jersey. The swing bridge is the 6th bridge from the river's mouth at Newark Bay and is 4.6 miles (7.4 km) upstream from it. Opened in 1903 and substantially rehabilitated in 1991 it is listed on the New Jersey Register of Historic Places (ID#1274) and is eligible for the National Register of Historic Places. The bridge was re-lamped in 2012.

The lower 17 miles (27 km) of the 90-mile (140 km) long Passaic River downstream of the Dundee Dam is tidally influenced and navigable, but due to the limited maritime traffic the bridge is infrequently required to open. It is one of three functional vehicular and pedestrian swing bridges in the city, the others being the Clay Street Bridge and the Bridge Street Bridge. Since 1998, rules regulating drawbridge operations require a four-hour notice for them to be opened.

The bridge crosses the river at a point where former industrial uses are giving way to commercial, residential, and recreational development. The US Army Corps of Engineers is undertaking a rehabilitation of the river including oversight of environmental remediation and reconstruction of bulkheads.

At its southern end in the Newark Ironbound, the bridge crosses over Newark Riverfront Park and Raymond Boulevard, a major thoroughfare in the city between the Pulaski Skyway and Downtown Newark. It is adjacent to Riverbank Park.

At its northern end the bridge in Harrison begins a street named for Frank E. Rodgers, once one of the longest serving mayors of the United States. The district along the waterfront has been largely cleared of its industrial buildings, and become home to Sports Illustrated Stadium.

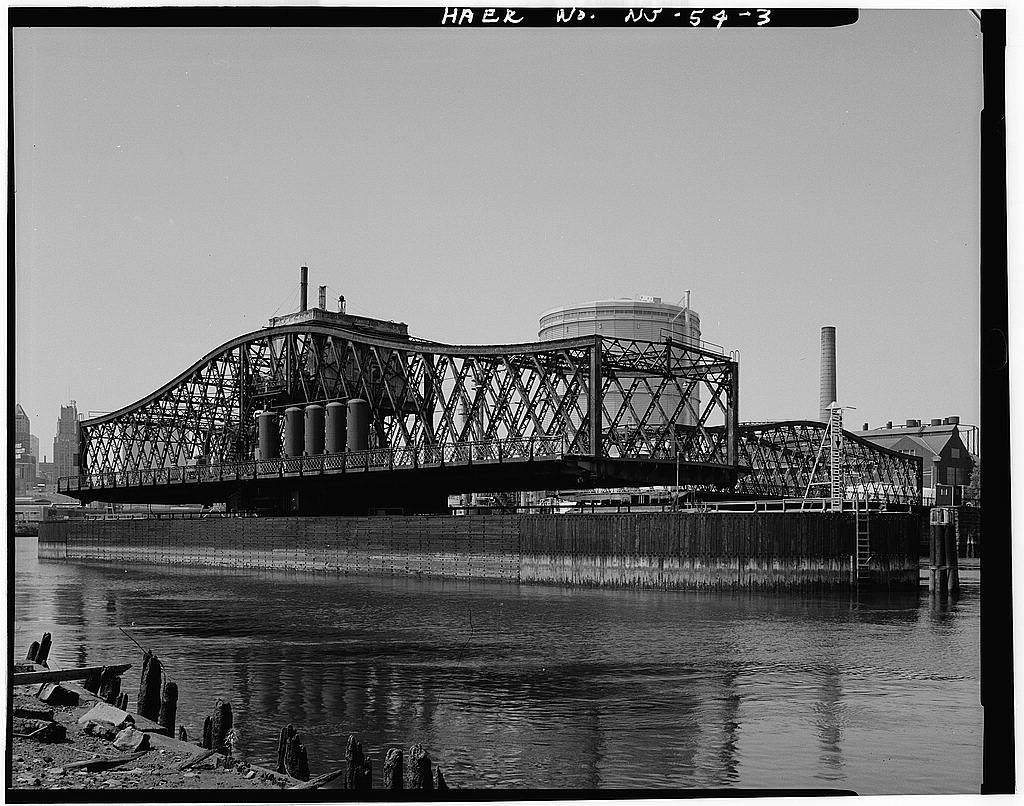
1954 view with former PSEG gas holder and Newark skyline in background

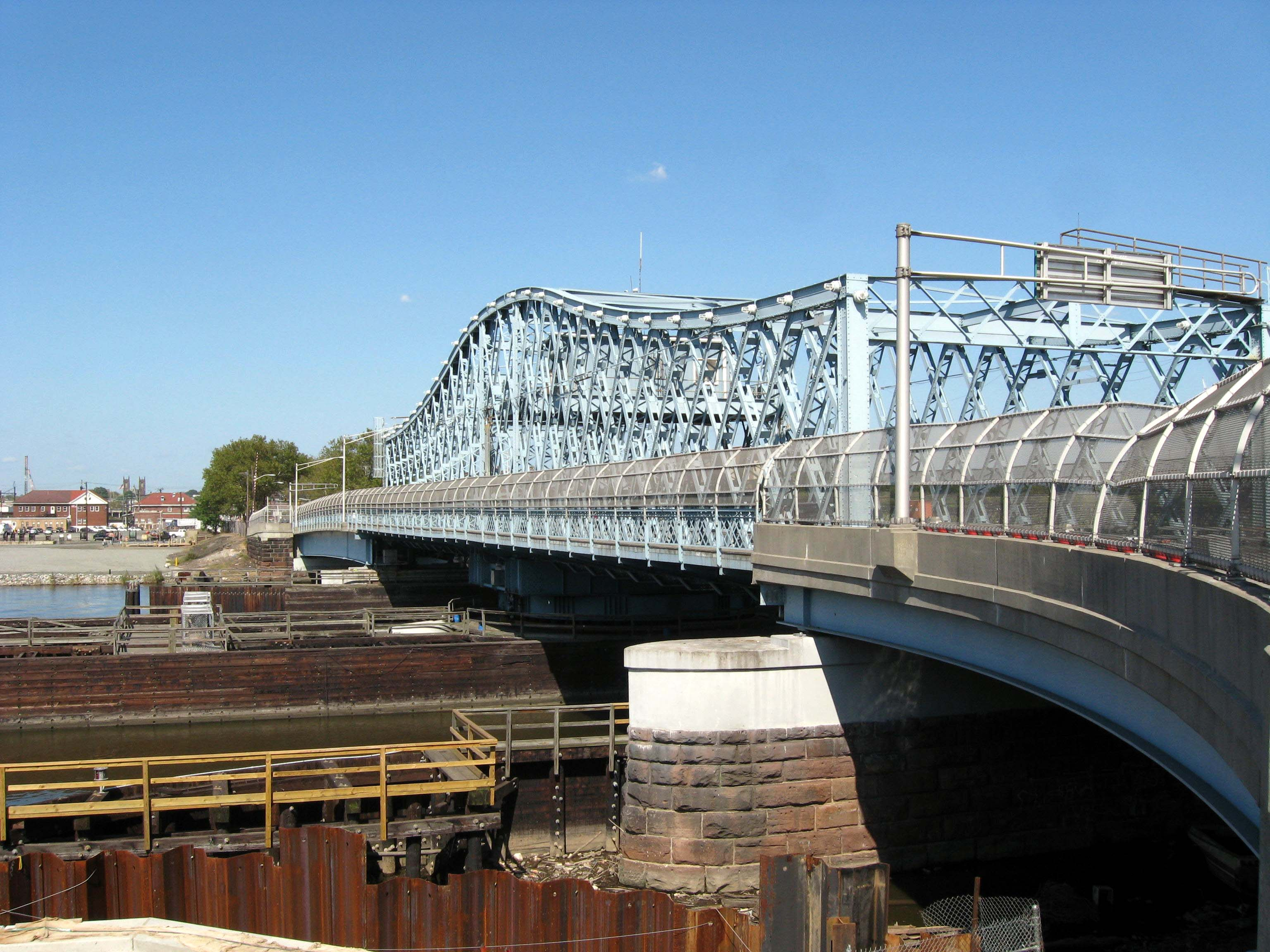
Jackson Street Bridge in 2008

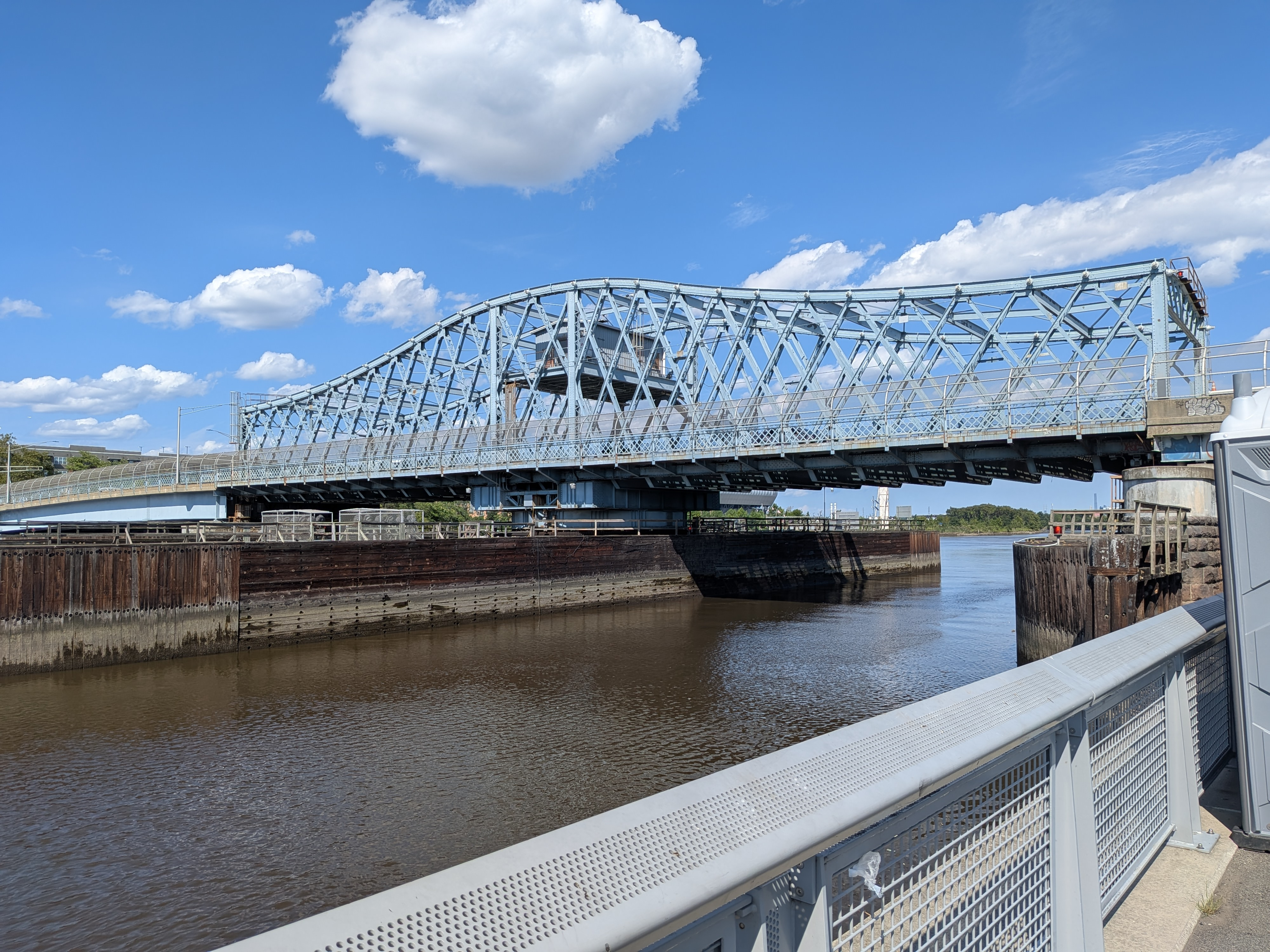
2026 view looking towards Harrison from Newark

== See also ==
- List of bridges documented by the Historic American Engineering Record in New Jersey
- List of bridges, tunnels, and cuts in Hudson County, New Jersey
- List of crossings of the Lower Passaic River
