= Kearny Riverbank Park =

Coordinates: 40.774496°N 74.151706°W

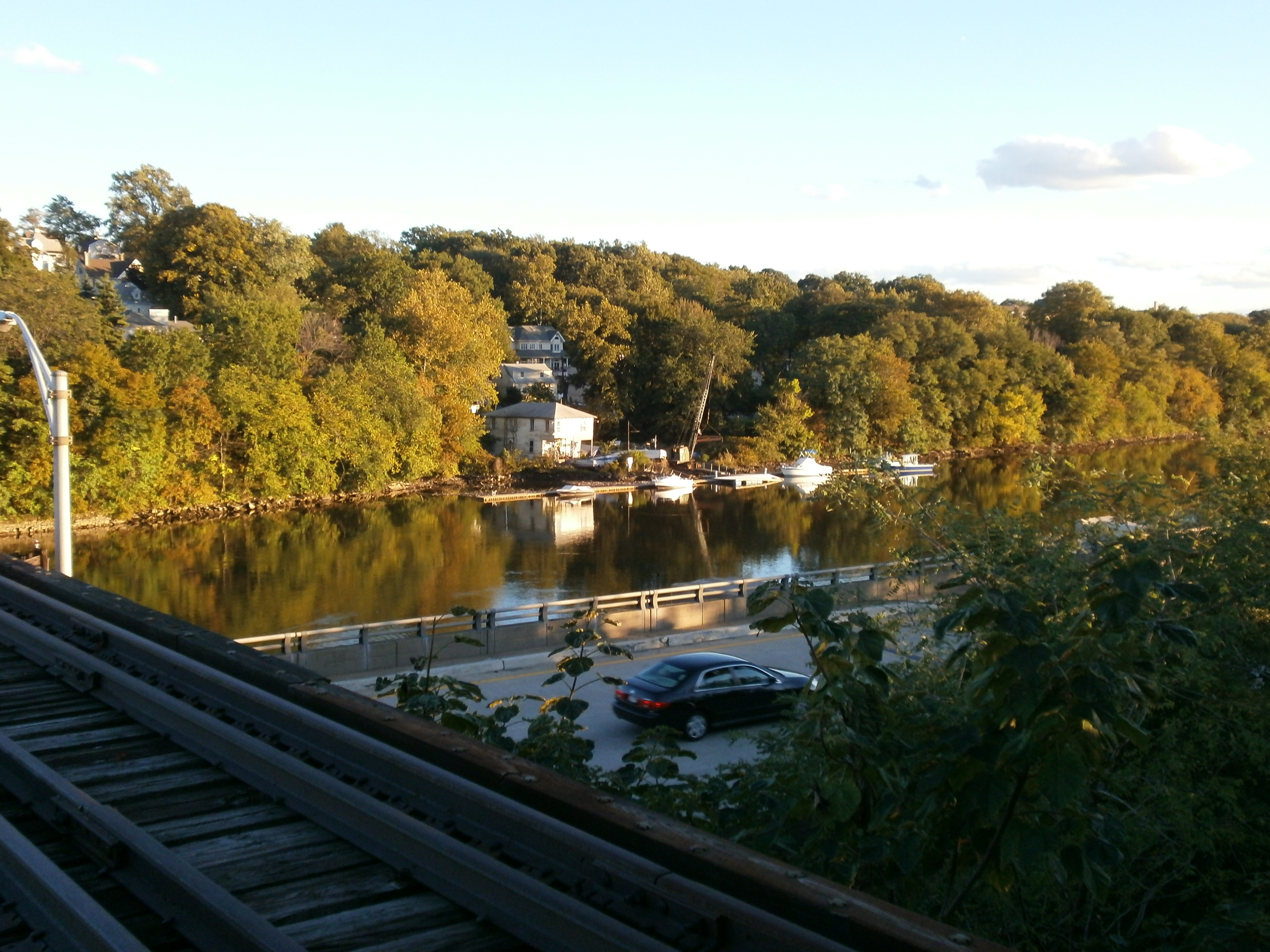
Rapp's Boathouse seen from former New York and Greenwood Lake Railway, the WR Draw, which crosses over the park and the Passaic River

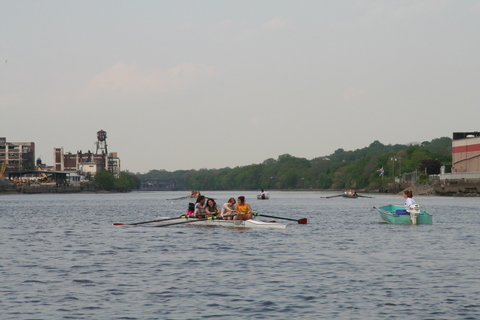
Rowers from Nutley High School

Kearny Riverbank Park is a municipal linear park along the Passaic River in Kearny, New Jersey. It is located in the Kearny Uplands north of Bergen Avenue and was extended to Belleville Turnpike in 2011 with brownfield reclamation projects. In 2012 improvements to the park's greenway were funded with a $1.8 million appropriation from the state.

The reaches of the Passaic along the park have long been popular with rowing teams The park is home to the boathouse used by Kearny, Belleville, and Nutley high school oarsmen.

== Dedications ==
Various sections of park are dedicated to historical figures and events. In some cases they are named for local dignitaries, such as Norman A. Doyle, Henry J. Hill, Daniel T. Sansone, and Joseph M. Healey, all of whom served as councilmen and as Mayor of Kearny. Keating Cove is dedicated to Bernard J. Keating and Wallace Glen is dedicated to both Sir William Wallace and Councilman David A. Wallace. Irish Heritage Park is dedicated to Reverend Monsignor Joseph A. Carroll. Other sections included the Centential Orchard and one dedicated to Christopher Columbus. Another part is named in memory of the Battle of Chantilly, where the town's namesake, Philip Kearny, lost his life in 1862. In 2006, many signboards demarcating the sections were replaced in a sponsorship campaign to renew them.

== Former Home for Disabled Soldiers ==
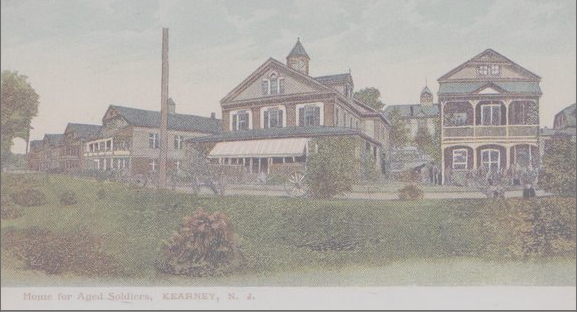

While most of the park is parallel to the river, Veterans Memorial Park covers an area that travels farther inland, and is situated on what was once the site of the New Jersey Home for Disabled Soldiers, an old soldiers' home which operated from 1888 to 1932, after which it donated the 10-acre grounds to the town for public recreational use. Many Civil War and Spanish–American War veterans are buried in the nearby Arlington Memorial Park.

== See also ==
- Riverbank Park Newark
- Newark Riverfront Park
- Hudson County Park System
- West Arlington (Erie Railroad station)
