= St. Stephan's Church (Ironbound, Newark, New Jersey) =

Historic church in New Jersey, United States

- U.S. National Register of Historic Places
- New Jersey Register of Historic Places
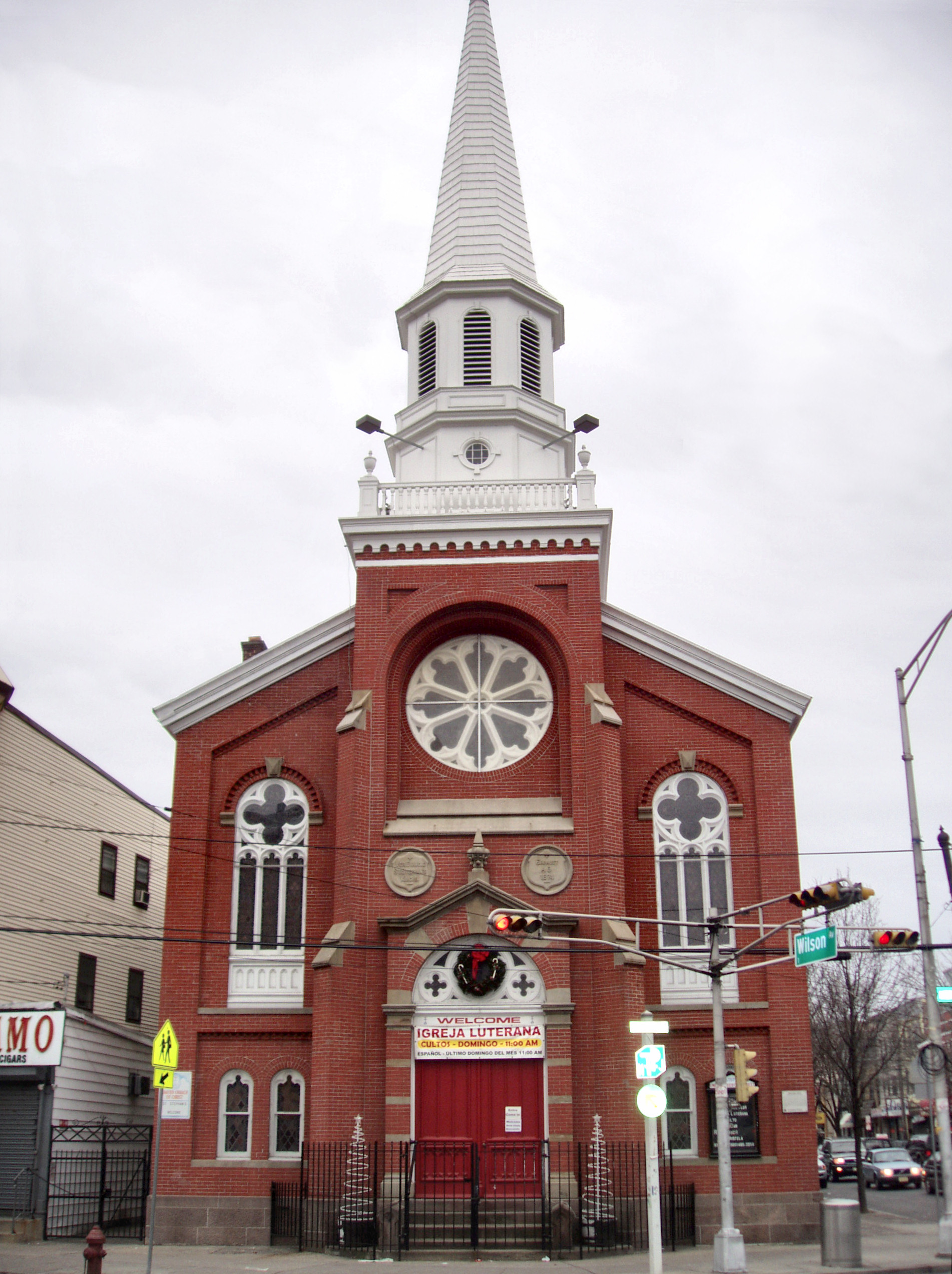

- Location within Essex County, New Jersey Location within New Jersey Location within the United States
- Location: Ferry Street and Wilson Avenue, Newark, New Jersey
- Coordinates: 40°43′40″N 74°9′20″W
- Area: 1 acre (0.40 ha)
- Built: 1874
- Architects: Stahlin, G.
- Architectural style: Romanesque
- NRHP reference No.: 72000792
- NJRHP No.
- Added to NRHP: October 5, 1972

St. Stephan's Church is a historic Lutheran church on Ferry Street and Wilson Avenue in the Ironbound section of Newark, New Jersey, United States.

== History ==
It was built in 1874 and added to the National Register of Historic Places in 1972. St. Stephan's Church was originally named St. Stephan's German United Evangelical Church, due to its establishment by Germans that had immigrated to the area. At an important road intersection in the Ironbound, St. Stephan's stands. The nickname of this intersection is referred to as "Five Corners" or "The Bend." In the 1960s, St. Stephan's switched from the United Evangelical Church to St. Stephan's United Church of Christ. It also switched from services in German to services in Portuguese and Spanish. This was due to an influx of Brazilian immigrants to the area, many of whom began attending services at St. Stephan's. In 1997, the current pastor, Pastor Moacir Weirich, immigrated to the United States and opened the Lutheran Information Center nearby. In 2000, the Lutheran Church began sharing space with the United Church of Christ in St. Stephan's. At the time, services were primarily held in Portuguese. In 2009, the Church's merged, forming St. Stephan's Grace Community Church. Presently, St. Stephan's primarily holds services in Spanish, but offers them in three languages, Portuguese, English, and Spanish.

St. Stephan's now shares space with three community organizations based in Newark. These include the New Labor organization, the Newark Water Coalition, and the Ironbound Community Corporation.

This was also the site of the alien ship rising up from beneath of the street in the 2005 film, War of the Worlds starring Tom Cruise along with Rick Gonzalez and Yul Vazquez. The recreated church front facing onto Merchant Street was mechanically designed to shear off and move as the earth shook before the alien craft emerged.

Today, St. Stephan’s Church is a congregation in the Evangelical Lutheran Church in America, ministering primarily to Portuguese- and Spanish-speaking parishioners.

== See also ==
- National Register of Historic Places listings in Essex County, New Jersey
