= Passaic River =

River in New Jersey, United States

Passaic River Pahsayèk (Unami)
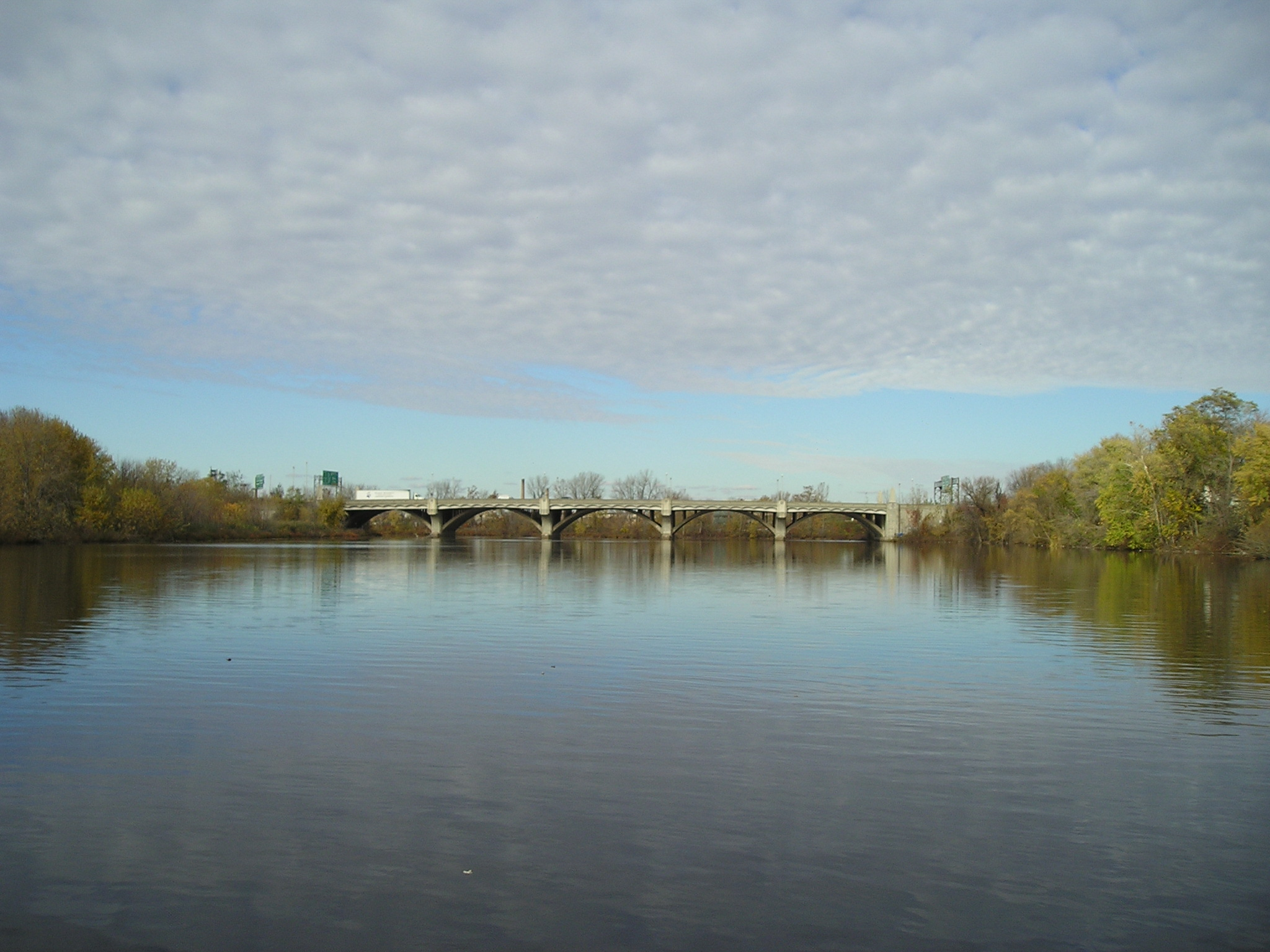
- Passaic River in Bergen and Passaic Counties

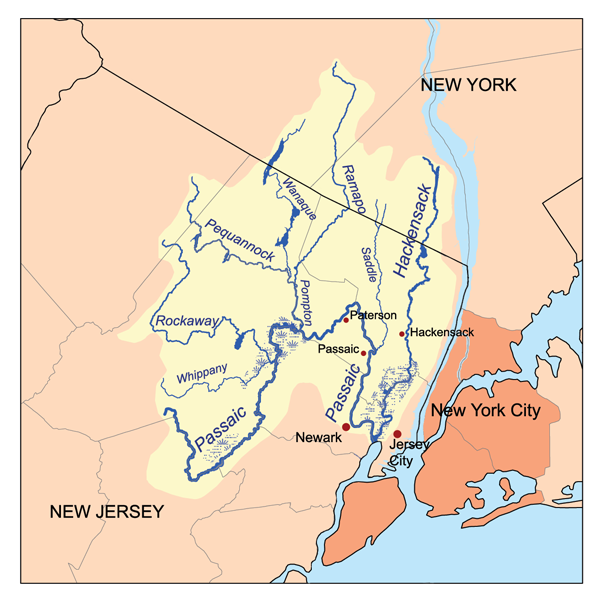
- The Passaic and Hackensack watersheds
- Etymology: Algonquian, meaning "peaceful valley"

Location
- Country: United States
- State: New Jersey
- Counties: Hudson, Essex, Bergen, Passaic, Morris, Union, Somerset
- District: Northern New Jersey, Gateway, Skylands
- Cities: Newark, Paterson, Clifton, Garfield, Elmwood Park, New Jersey Passaic

Physical characteristics
- Source: Unknown Pond
  - location: Mendham
  - coordinates: 40°45′44″N 74°34′39″W
  - elevation: 540 ft (160 m)
- Mouth: Newark Bay
  - location: Newark
  - coordinates: 40°42′46″N 74°07′08″W
  - elevation: 0 ft (0 m)
- Length: 85 mi (137 km)
- Basin size: 935 sq mi (2,420 km^{2})
- Discharge
  - location: Little Falls
  - average: 2,100 cu ft/s (59 m^{3}/s)
  - minimum: 36 cu ft/s (1.0 m^{3}/s)
  - maximum: 8,330 cu ft/s (236 m^{3}/s)
- Discharge
  - location: Chatham
  - average: 320 cu ft/s (9.1 m^{3}/s)

Basin features
- Tributaries
  - left: Rockaway River, Pompton River, Saddle River
  - right: Dead River

The Passaic River (/pəˈseɪ.ɪk/ pə-SAY-ik or locally /pəˈseɪk/ pə-SAYK) is a river, approximately 85 miles (137 km) long, in northern New Jersey. The river in its upper course flows in a highly circuitous route, meandering through the swamp lowlands between the ridge hills of rural and suburban northern New Jersey, called the Great Swamp, draining much of the northern portion of the state through its tributaries.

In its lower (southern) portion, it flows through the most urbanized and industrialized areas of the state, including along Downtown Newark. The lower river suffered from severe pollution and industrial abandonment in the 20th century. In April 2014, the U.S. Environmental Protection Agency (EPA) announced a $1.7 billion plan to remove 4.3 million cubic yards (3.3 million cubic metres) of toxic mud from the bottom of lower eight miles (13 km) of the river. It is considered one of the most polluted stretches of water in the nation, and the project is one of the largest toxic cleanups ever undertaken in the nation.

== Course ==
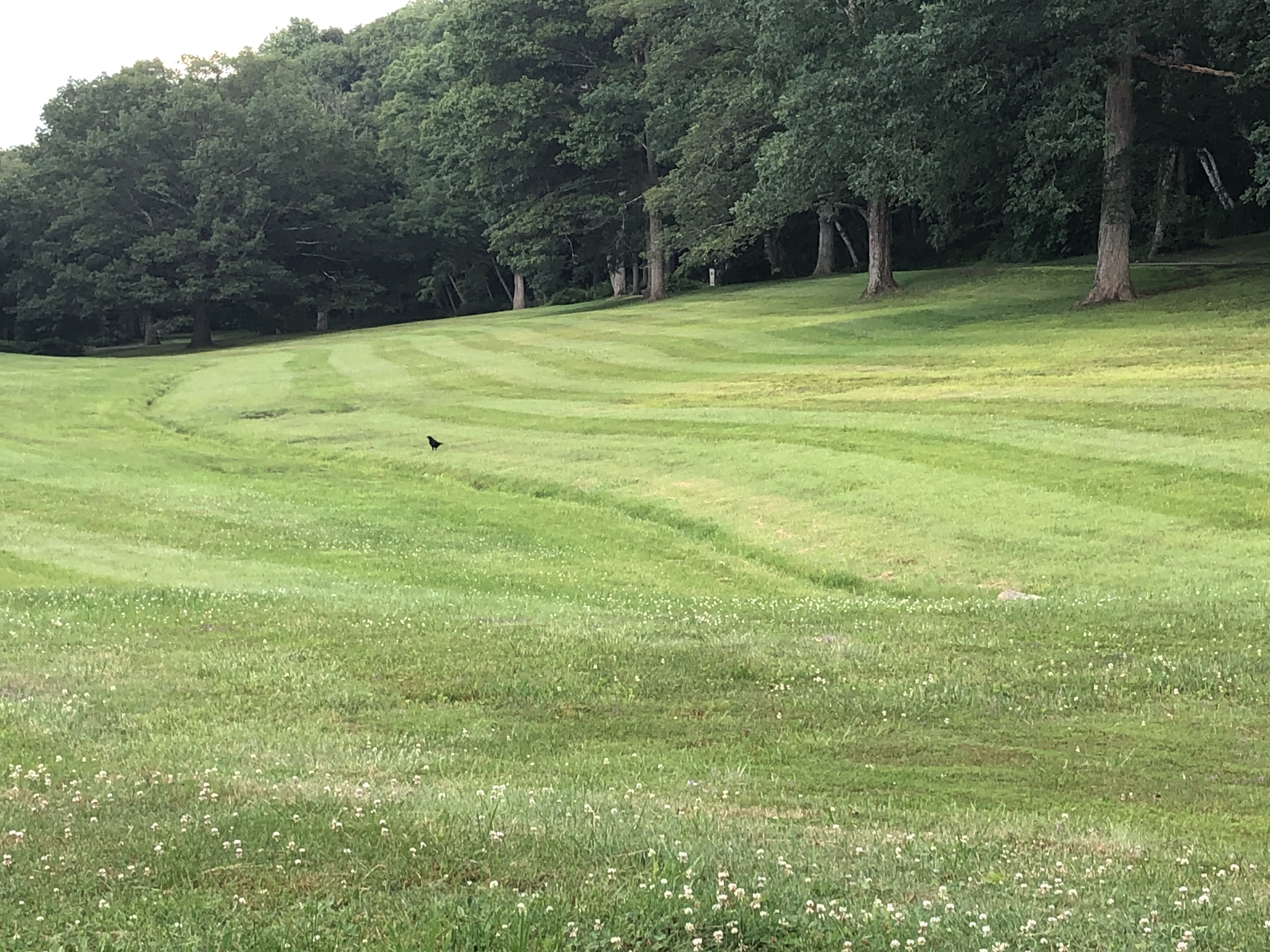
A spring located at approximately 40.761025,-74.581318 (visible in the lower right of the photo) located near the sharp bend in Spring Hill Road begins a small stream that flows roughly 1000 feet east northeast into Dubourg Pond. The stream is visible to the left of the spring flowing down into a grove of trees at the upper left of the photo. This spring likely represents the true headwater of the Passaic River.

The Passaic River rises in the center of Mendham, in southern Morris County. According to Google Maps the river begins at Dubourg Pond located on private land between Spring Hill Road and Hardscrabble Road. This pond is fed by a very small stream that begins from a spring located approximately 1000 feet south west of the pond at the bend in Spring Hill Road. This spring is the likely true headwater of the Passaic River. Leaving Dubourg Pond the river travels northeast and crosses Corey Lane before entering the Buck Hill Tract Natural Area. However At this point, the river begins to generally flow south, through Morristown National Historical Park, and forms the boundary between Morris and Somerset counties. In its current path, it passes through the southeast edge and drains Lord Stirling Park then along the western edge of the Great Swamp, which it drains through several small tributaries including Black Brook. The river passes through a gorge in Millington and then turns abruptly northeast, flowing through the valley between Long Hill to the west and the Second Watchung Mountain to the east.

It forms the boundary between Morris and Union counties as it passes Berkeley Heights, New Providence, and Summit. Near Chatham it turns north, forming the boundary between Morris and Essex counties. It passes Livingston and Fairfield, where it flows through the Hatfield Swamp and is joined by the Rockaway River just after the Rockaway is joined by its own tributary, the Whippany River. Southwest of Lincoln Park it passes through the Great Piece Meadows, where it turns abruptly eastward and is joined at Two Bridges by its major tributary, the Pompton River, then meandering through Little Falls, New Jersey as it drops over a fall, across some rapids, and under Passaic County Route 646 and an abandoned railroad trestle.

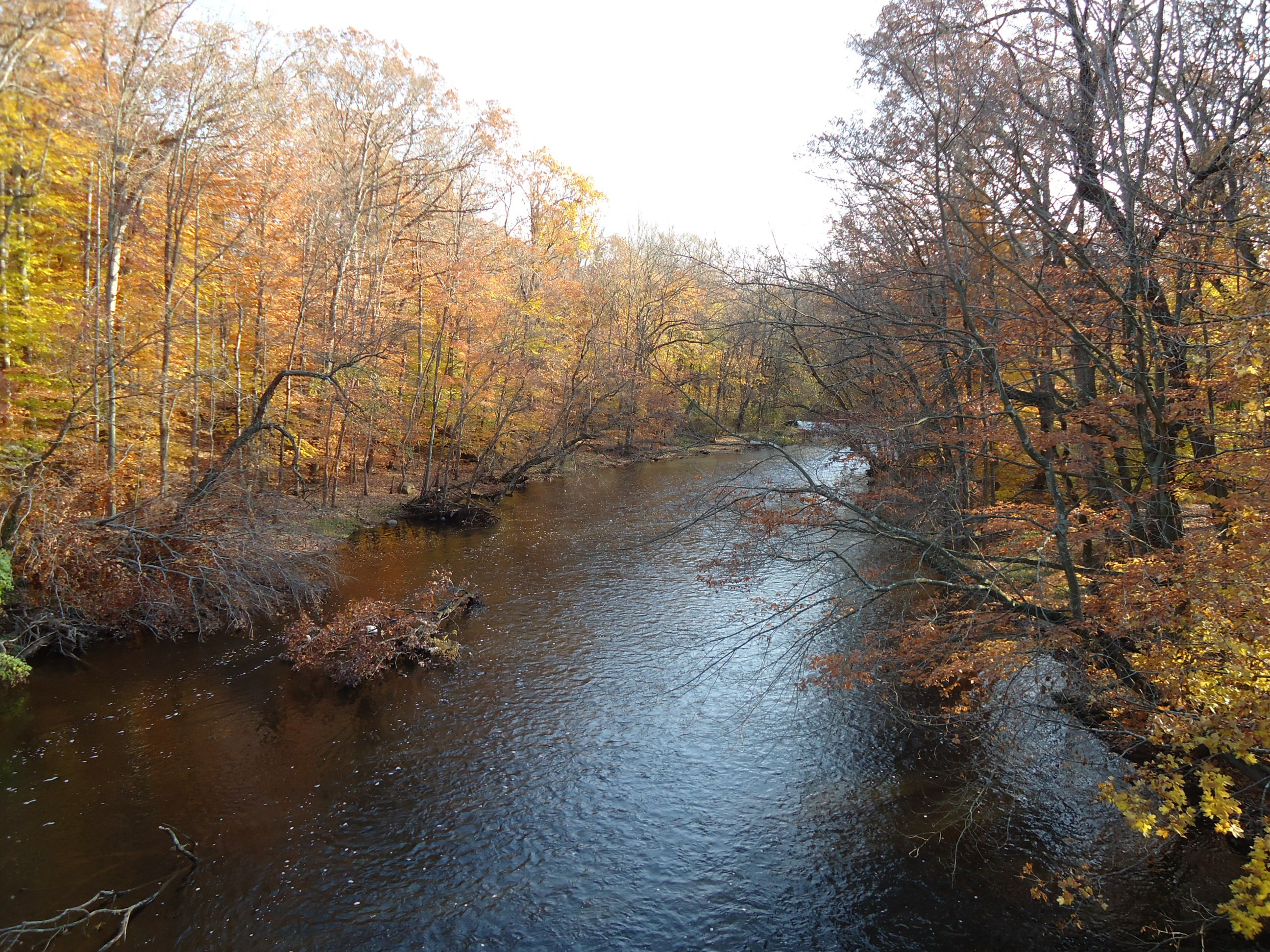
Flowing between Summit and Chatham

The river flows northeast into the city of Paterson, where it drops over the Great Falls of the Passaic. On the north end of Paterson, it turns abruptly south, flowing between Paterson and Clifton on the west and Hawthorne, Fair Lawn, Elmwood Park, Garfield on the east, next through the city of Clifton. At Elmwood Park it begins to form Dundee Lake, created by the Dundee Dam built in 1845. The river becomes navigable 2.5 miles (4.0 km) downstream of the Dundee Dam at the Eighth Street/Locust Ave Bridge in Wallington where the dredged Wallington Reach channel begins. Proceeding beyond the Wallington Reach, the river remains navigable via a series of maintained channels to its final destination, Newark Bay. It passes Passaic, Clifton again, then Nutley and Belleville on the west; it flows past Rutherford, Lyndhurst, and North Arlington to the east.

In its lowest reaches, it flows along the northeast portion of the city of Newark on the west, passing Kearny, East Newark, and Harrison on the eastern bank. Near downtown Newark it makes an abrupt easterly bend, then south around Ironbound, joining the Hackensack River at the northern end of Newark Bay, a back bay of New York Harbor.

== History ==
=== Geology ===
The Passaic River formed as a result of drainage from a massive proglacial lake that formed in North Jersey at the end of the last ice age, approximately 13,000 years ago. That prehistoric lake is now known as Glacial Lake Passaic and was centered in the present lowland swamps of Morris County, forming because of a blockage of the normal drainage path. Eventually, the lake level rose high enough that the water flowed out of a new outlet. The Passaic River found a new path to the ocean via the Millington Gorge and the Paterson Falls as the glacier that covered the area retreated northward and the lake drained. As a result, the river as we now know it was born.

=== Native American weirs ===
Prior to European colonialization along the Passaic in the late 17th century, the valley was the territory of the Lenape groups now known as the Acquackanonk and Hackensack, who used the river for fishing. To that end they built weirs, or overflow dams, to create pools and where the fish could be trapped. Many of these archeological sites are still present and, in some cases, in good condition.

=== Economic development ===
The river was highly significant in the early industrial development of New Jersey. It provided a navigable route connected by canals to the Delaware River starting in the late 18th century. It also was an early source of hydropower at the Great Falls of the Passaic in Paterson, resulting in the early emergence of the area as the center of industrial mills.

=== Pollution ===
Much of the lower river suffered severe pollution during the 19th and 20th centuries because of industrial waste discharges to the river and improper waste disposal practices on adjacent land. Although the health of the river has improved due to implementation of the 1972 Clean Water Act and other environmental legislation, and the decline of industry along the river, it still suffers from substantial degradation of water quality. The sediment at the mouth of the river near Newark Bay remains contaminated by pollutants such as dioxin. The dioxin was generated principally by the Diamond Shamrock Chemical Plant in Newark, as a waste product resulting from the production of the Agent Orange defoliation chemical used during the Vietnam War. The cleanup of the dioxin contamination on the bottom of the river is the subject of a major environmental lawsuit regarding the responsibility for the cleanup. In 2008, the EPA reached a settlement with Occidental Chemical Corporation and Tierra Solutions Inc. to clean a portion of the polluted river. A New Jersey Superior Court judge, ruling in July and September 2011, stated that Occidental and Maxus Exergy Corporation (a subsidiary of YPF) are liable for remediation in other portions of the river. In 2013, several corporate defendants agreed to pay the State of New Jersey $130 million for ecological damages related to Passaic River pollution. However, it is unclear as to whether the state will actually use this money for clean-up efforts.

The New Jersey Department of Environmental Protection (NJDEP) issued notices in 2009 banning commercial fishing and advising the general public that fish caught in the tidal Passaic River (from Dundee Dam to the mouth at Newark Bay) should not be eaten. The fish consumption advisories remain in effect as of 2020.

In April 2014, EPA announced a $1.7 billion plan to remove 4.3 million cubic yards (3.3×10^{6} m^{3}) of toxic mud from the bottom of lower eight miles (13 km) of the river. It is considered one of the most polluted stretches of water in the nation and one of the biggest clean-ups project ever undertaken.

=== Economic decline and resurgence ===
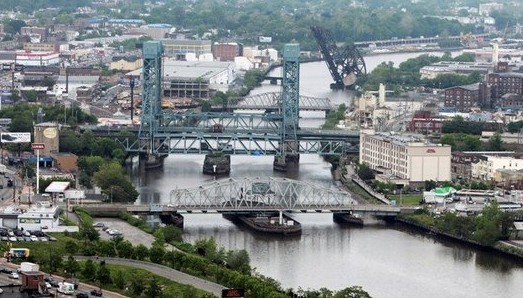
Five bridges over the Passaic River at Newark

Passing Passaic river by New Jersey Transit train, east of Broad Street Station

The decline of manufacturing on the lower river has left a post-industrial landscape of abandoned and disused factories and other facilities. In particular, the stretch of the river along downtown Newark came to be regarded in the latter decades of the 20th century as particularly wretched. Starting in the 1990s, the lower river became the subject of federal and state urban restoration efforts, which have resulted in new construction along the riverfront, the city of Newark has constructed a riverfront walk from the Jackson Street Bridge to the Bridge Street Bridge. It is landscaped with trees, plants, flowers, and benches. Construction of office buildings has also taken place, including a regional headquarters building for the FBI.

While there has been a decline in the industrial use of the river, recreational use has increased since the early 1990s. There has been a long tradition of high school rowing by Kearny (since 1968), Belleville (1942, New Jersey's first public high school crew team), and Nutley High Schools and, in 1990, the historic Nereid Boat Club (founded in 1868) was revived, broadening participation in the sport of rowing on the Passaic River. In 1999, the Passaic River Rowing Association became the second rowing club along the banks of the Lower Passaic River. Today, the rowing community is very active through the two Rowing Clubs (Nereid Boat Club and Passaic River Rowing Association) and ten high school crews that include Kearny, Belleville, Nutley, Don Bosco Prep, St. Peter's Preparatory School, Montclair, Ridgewood, Teaneck, Westfield, North Arlington (2012-13 School Year), and St. Benedict's Prep. The Passaic River is also host to the annual Head of the Passaic Regatta that has been held since 2001.

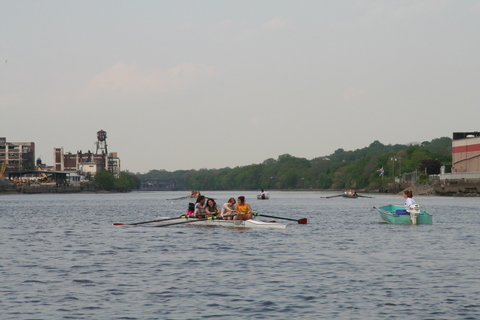
Oarswomen from Nutley High School and their coach working out in the Passaic River at Newark

Commercial transport on the Lower Passaic hasn't entirely died. On December 3, 2008, a barge was loaded with biodiesel at the former W.A.S. Terminals in Newark, now Passaic River Terminals. Innovation Fuels LLC, one of the terminal's tenants, has plans to continue to sell two barge loads a month of biodiesel to customers in Europe. This is the first commercial barge in the river in over 15 years. Although they experienced some delays with the County drawbridges that have been neglected for years and had some problems with shoaling due to the lack of maintenance dredging, they remain undeterred and the Passaic River represents the cheapest and most efficient method to ship their cargo to its customers.

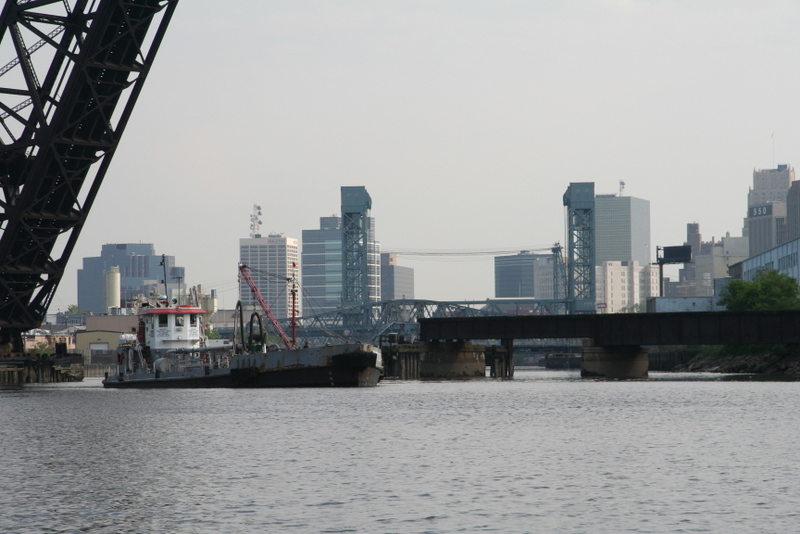
The tanker Patrick Sky clearing the NX Bascule Bridge in Newark, the last hurdle before unloading its cargo of over 200,000 gallons of biodiesel.

== Vantage points ==
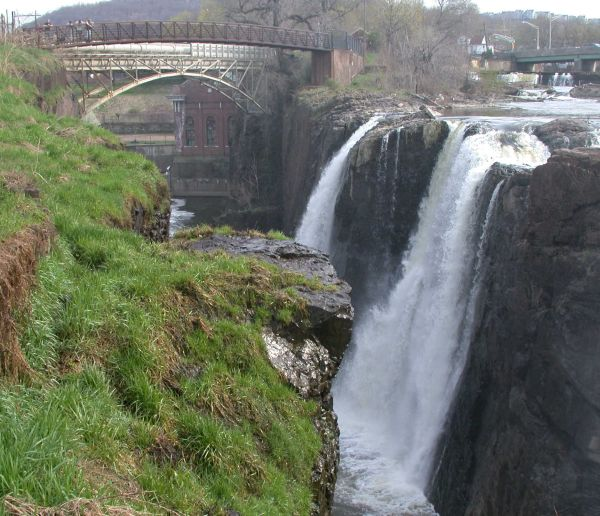
The Great Falls of the Passaic River in Paterson

The Passaic River can be accessed via a number of county parks. One notable park is Stanley Park between Summit and Chatham. Other parks along the river are located in Passaic County. As part of the ongoing Newark revitalization effort by the city government, parkland is proposed along the banks of the river.

The Passaic River generally is free of industrialization until it reaches the Summit and Chatham border. The upper portion of the river, above Summit and Chatham, are more natural in appearance and the river has more of a young river character in places. The middle portion of the river flows through natural marshlands and forested areas in Essex County, which are generally inaccessible, and then through heavily populated areas of Passaic County where it is accessible via parallel roads and parks. Lower portions of the river, south of Paterson are wider, more industrialized, and more mature in nature. Kearny Riverbank Park and Riverbank Park in Newark both provide waterfront access. The banks of the lower few miles (kilometers) of the river mainly are industrialized.

== Flooding problems ==
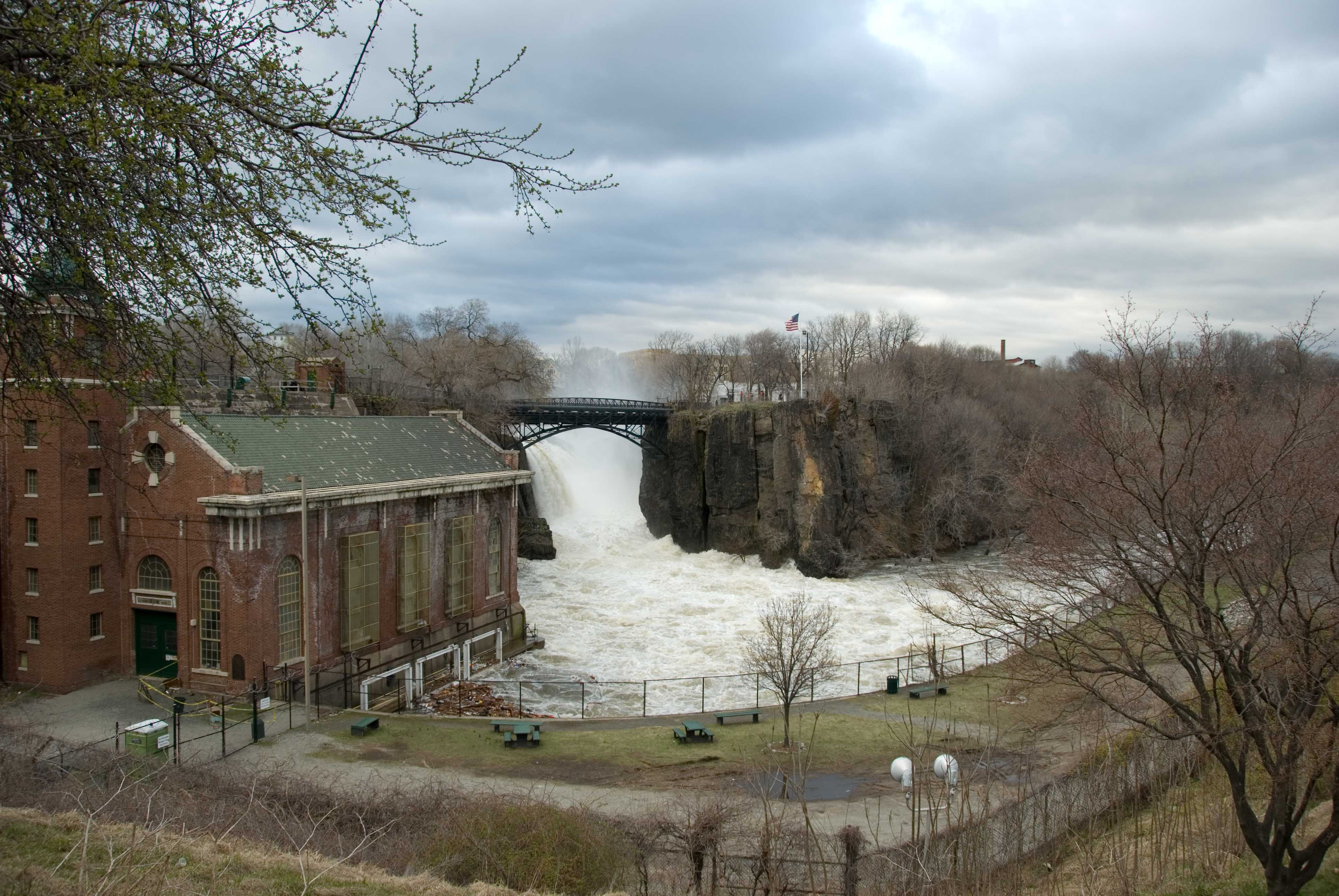
The Great Falls after 8 inches (20 cm) of rain drenched Northern New Jersey the second week of April 2007. Taken April 18, 2007.

The Passaic River is known for chronic flooding problems during periods of heavy rainfall or snow-melt, especially where the Pompton River joins the Passaic River on the border of Fairfield, Lincoln Park, and Wayne. The two rivers form a sizable flood plain in this area. Building has been allowed in the flood plain and during extreme weather events that occur on a fairly regular basis, homes and businesses in the flood plain become flooded. A plan has been proposed to build a massive 20 miles (32 km) structure, the Passaic River Flood Tunnel, to divert the periodic floodwaters southeasterly into Newark Bay, thus relieving these flooding problems upstream. Some residents have accepted buy-outs from the federal government while the concept of constructing a flood tunnel is debated, however, many residents still live within the flood plain and flooding appears to be growing worse as the land in the Passaic River basin continues to be developed.

=== Little Falls River Gauge ===
The Little Falls River Gauge along the Passaic River is located just south of the junction with the Pompton River, in an area that frequently floods. Flood stage is 7 feet (2.1 m) at this location.

=== Floods ===
On February 28, 1902, there was severe flooding of the river. On October 10, 1903, the worst flood on record happened. The water crest was 17.50 feet (5.33 m) and severe flooding of Little Falls, Paterson, as well as many other areas along the river. Other high crests were: 12.91 feet (3.93 m) on April 7, 1984; 11.88 feet (3.62 m) on April 18, 2007; and 11.87 feet (3.62 m) on March 16, 2010. On April 23, 2010, Governor Chris Christie issued an order creating the Passaic River Basin Flood Advisory Commission. In January 2011 a report was issued, mentioning the 2010 flood, and the result was for municipalities to change their master plans and change local flood damage prevention ordinances, which would include such things as elevating structures, and to stop expansion into flood zones. The areas considered prone to continual flooding are Acid Brook, Buttermilk Falls, Haycock Brook, Mahwah River, Masonicus Brook, Packanack Brook, Pequannock River, Plog Brook, Pompton River, Ramapo River, Third River, Wanaque River, and Wolf Creek. On August 30, 2011 there was another flood with a 14.19 feet (4.33 m) crest. The flood control issue had been considered as far back as 1870 and there were studies in 1939, 1948, 1962, 1969, 1972, 1973, 1987, and 1995 with minimum results from report suggestions.

== In the arts and literature ==
A poem about the river was written by John Alleyne Macnab in 1890, and put to music by Fountains of Wayne.

The river hosted a group of Inuit plantation workers on the run in the 2004 short story, "From Out of the River", by beat laureate Spencer Hash.

The river, and especially its Great Falls, plays a large part in William Carlos Williams's epic poem Paterson.

From 2006 to 2008, writer Wheeler Antabanez traveled the Passaic River and its shores, chronicling his adventures in a special issue of Weird NJ magazine. Nightshade on the Passaic was released as a special issue of the magazine and quickly became its best-selling issue, confirming readers' interest in stories involving the Passaic River. Antabanez intentionally did not want the special issue to be a history lesson of New Jersey or the river but instead wanted it to be a Huckleberry Finn-style adventure story.

In his canoe, Nightshade, Antabanez visits the most dangerous parts of the Passaic, along with several of the abandoned buildings and factories that relied on the Passaic years ago. In addition to the river and the decaying structures that surround it, he also researched murders that involved the Passaic River, including the horrific case of Jonathan Zarate, who attempted to dump the mutilated body of his 16-year-old neighbor in the river but was thwarted by a police officer who happened to pass by at the time.

== Tributaries ==
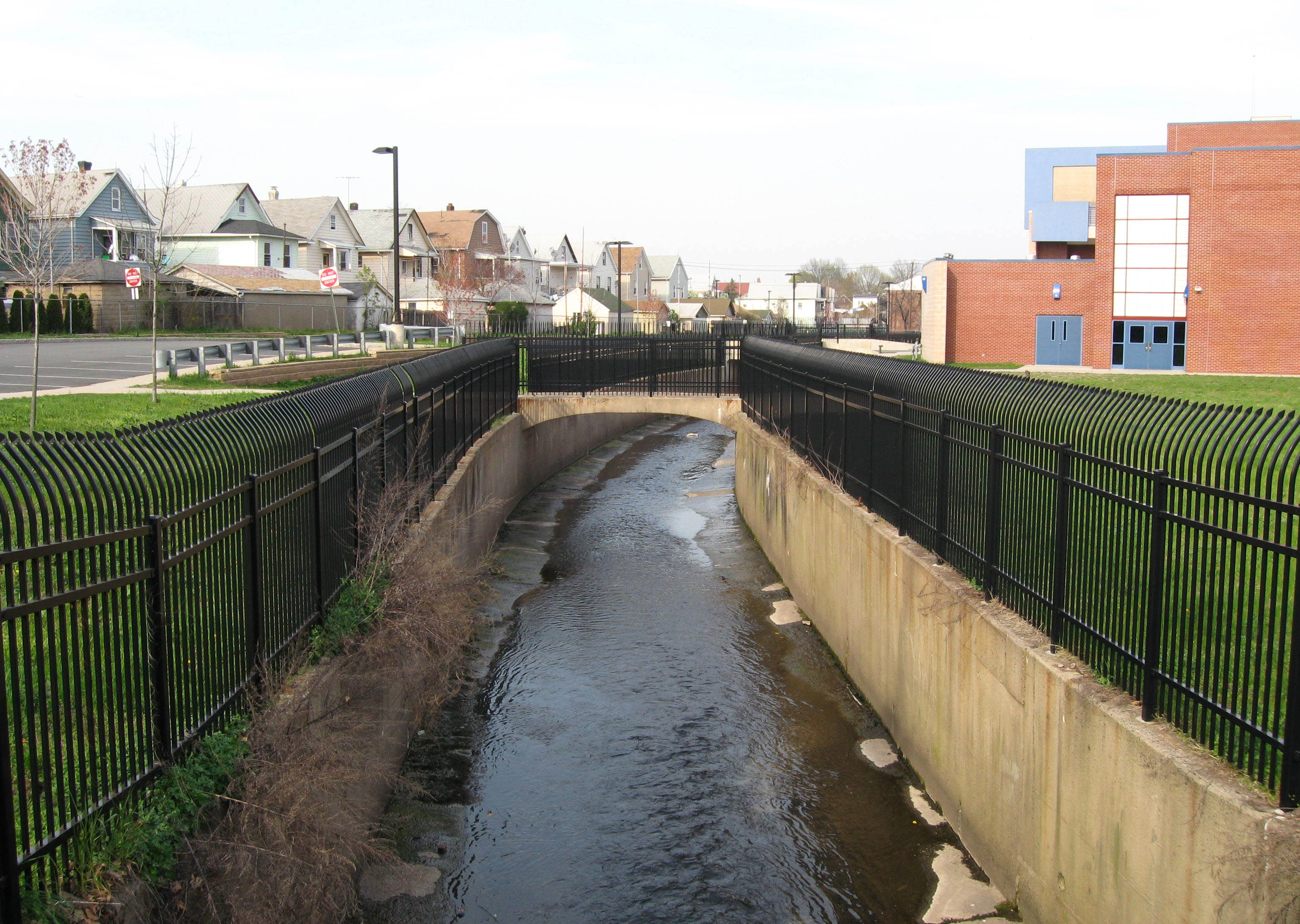
Weasel Brook, one of the Passaic River's tributaries, running alongside Clifton Public School#17; the school was built on the site of Little Weasel Brook Park, a former Passaic County park sold to the city to build the school

(As encountered traveling upstream to its source):

- First River (a.k.a. Mill Brook)
- Second River or Watsessing River
- Third River or Yanticaw River
- McDonalds Brook (originally Mineral Spring Brook)
- Weasel Brook
- Saddle River
  - Ho-Ho-Kus Brook
- Fleischer Brook
- Lyncrest Brook
- Little Diamond Brook

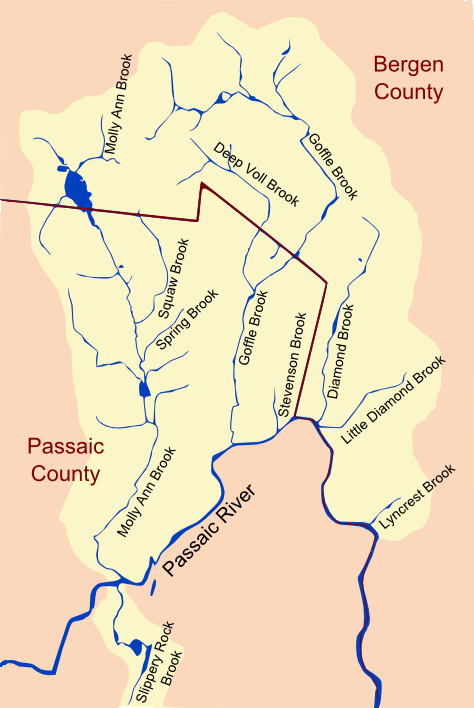
Tributaries of the Passaic River's North Bend

- Diamond Brook
- Stevenson Brook
- Goffle Brook
  - Deep Voll Brook
- Molly Ann Brook
  - Spring Brook
  - Squaw Brook
- Slippery Rock Brook
- Peckman River
- Singac Brook
- Deepavaal Brook
- Pompton River
  - Pequannock River
    - Wanaque River
  - Ramapo River
    - Mahwah River
- Rockaway River
  - Whippany River
- Foulerton's Brook
- Spring Garden Brook
- Slough Brook

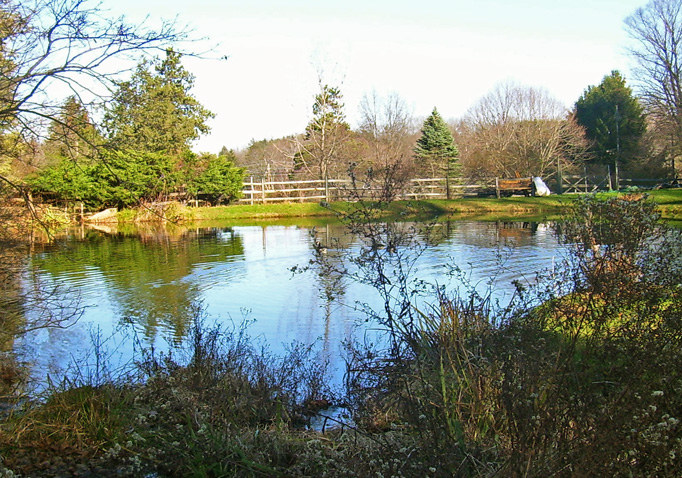
Source of the Passaic, in Mendham

- Canoe Brook
- Salt Brook
- Cory's Brook
- Dead River
- Black Brook
- Great Brook
- Loantaka Brook
- Primrose Brook
- Penns Brook
- Indian Grove Brook
- Naakpunkt Brook
- Taylor Brook

== Crossings ==
- List of crossings of the Lower Passaic River
- List of crossings of the Upper Passaic River

== See also ==
- List of rivers of New Jersey
- List of most-polluted rivers
- Passaic Formation
- List of bridges, tunnels, and cuts in Hudson County, New Jersey
