= Bridge Street Bridge (Newark) =

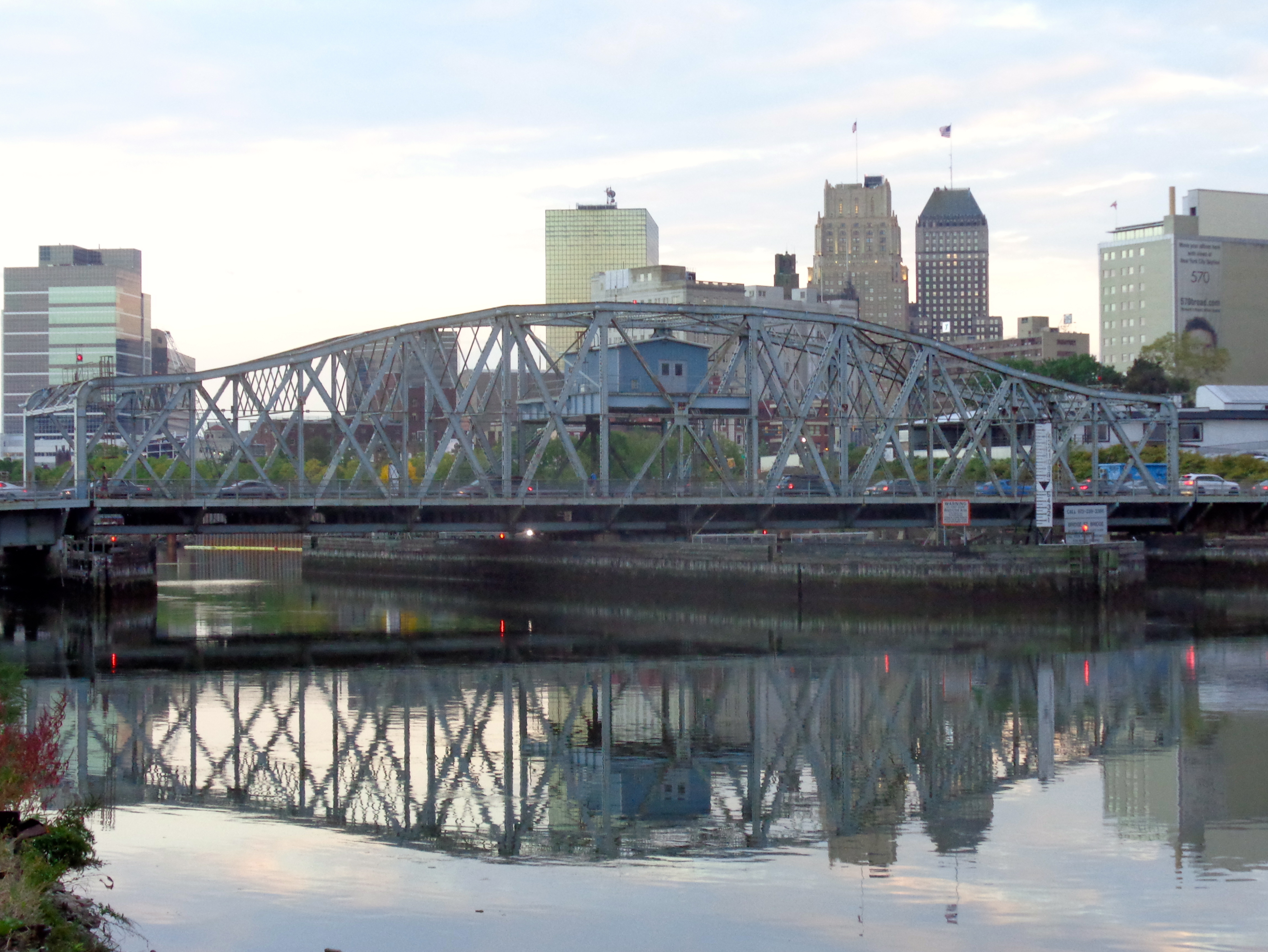
- Coordinates: 40.7451°N 74.1657°W
- Carries: CR 508 (Bridge Street & Harrison Avenue)
- Crosses: Passaic River
- Locale: Newark and Harrison, New Jersey
- Owner: Essex County
- ID number: 0700H03

Characteristics
- Design: Through truss swing bridge
- Material: Steel
- Total length: 371.1 feet (113.1 m)
- Width: 40.4 feet (12.3 m)
- Longest span: 122.1 feet (37.2 m)
- No. of spans: 2
- Clearance above: 12 feet (3.7 m)
- Clearance below: 6.9 feet (2.1 m)

History
- Constructed by: American Bridge Company
- Opened: 1913

Statistics
- Daily traffic: 11,820

Location
- Interactive map of Bridge Street Bridge

Bridge Street Bridge is a swing bridge over the Passaic River connecting Newark and Harrison, New Jersey. It is the 10th bridge from the river's mouth at Newark Bay and is 5.7 miles (9.2 km) upstream from it. Carrying vehicular traffic, the roadway is designated County Route 508.

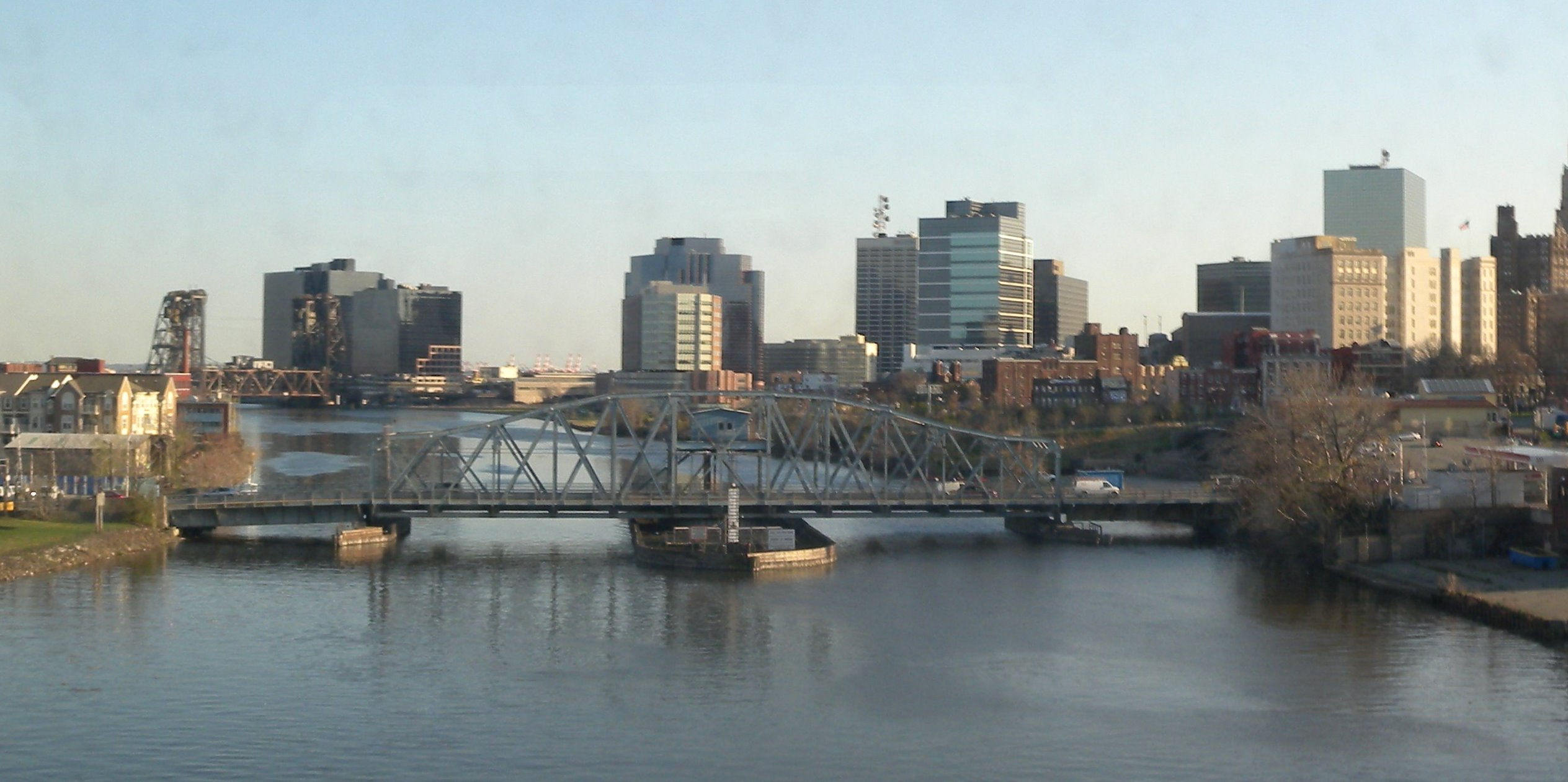

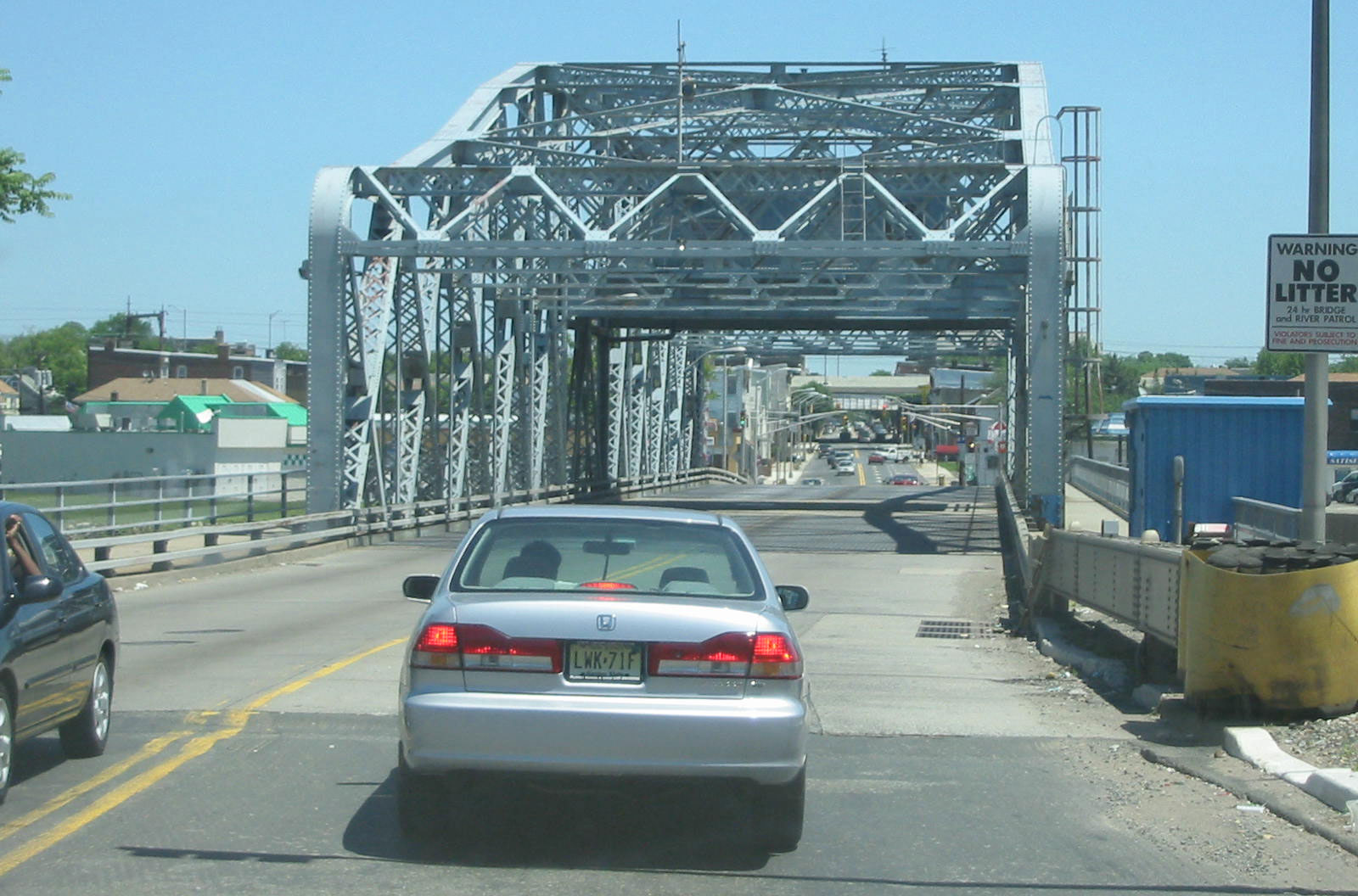
Entrance at Bridge Street looking east

The span is a rim-bearing Pratt thru truss swing span supported on ashlar substructure with concrete caps originally built by the American Bridge Company. It opened in 1913 and underwent significant rehabilitation in 1981. It is listed on the New Jersey Register of Historic Places (ID#3093) The bridge was re-lamped in 2012. The bridge's electric motor was damaged by Hurricane Sandy in 2012, requiring replacement.

Like the other vehicular swing bridges in Newark, the Jackson Street Bridge and the Clay Street Bridge, it crosses over the tidal navigable portion of the river. and is required to open with 4-hour notice. The swing bridges of Newark are expected to open as much as 10 times a day during a massive clean-up of the Passaic starting in 2019 to allow barges to move contaminated sludge dredged from the river bottom raising concerns about their reliability. As of 2016 studies were underway to study its replacement.

== History ==
The site of Bridge Street Bridge has been a river crossing since the colonial era. In 1790 the state legislature decided that "public good would be served by a 64 feet (20 m) wide road from Paulus Hook to the Newark Courthouse". By 1795 a bridge over the Hackensack 950 feet (290 m) long and another over the Passaic 492 feet (150 m) long were built creating an uninterrupted toll road connection. The road between them is known as the Newark Turnpike.

== See also ==
- List of crossings of the Lower Passaic River
- List of bridges, tunnels, and cuts in Hudson County, New Jersey
