= Murphy Varnish Works =

- U.S. National Register of Historic Places
- New Jersey Register of Historic Places
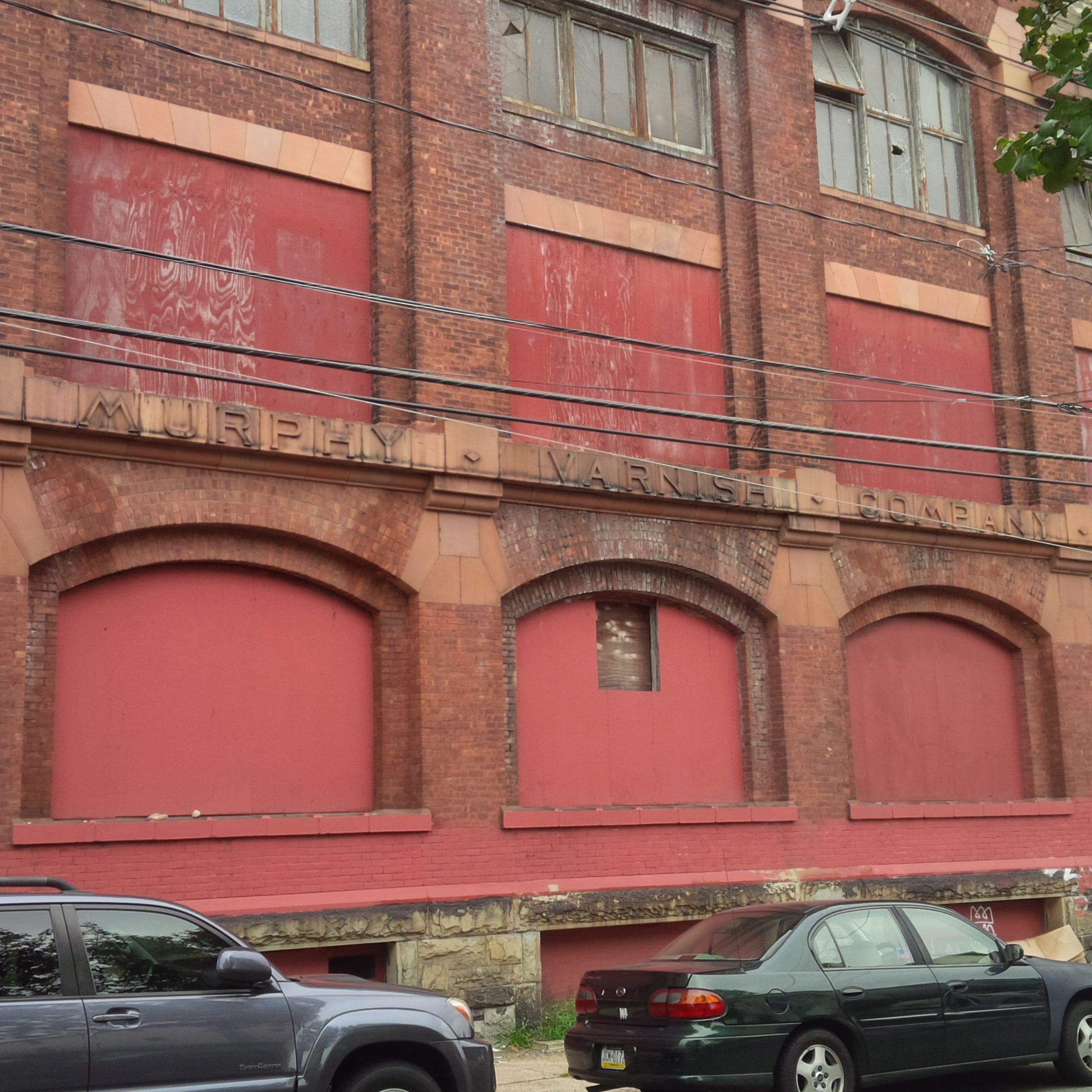

- Location within Essex County, New Jersey Location within New Jersey Location within the United States
- Location: McWhorter, Vesey, and Chestnut Streets, Newark, New Jersey
- Coordinates: 40°43′28″N 74°10′14″W
- Area: 3.5 acres (1.4 ha)
- Built: 1865
- Architects: Chapman, Howard; Lindsey, James
- Architectural style: Late Victorian, Italianate, Richardsonian Romanesque
- NRHP reference No.: 79001484
- NJRHP No.: 1287

Significant dates
- Added to NRHP: March 9, 1979
- Designated NJRHP: April 15, 1978

Established in 1865, Murphy Varnish Works was once the largest varnish-producing company in Newark, Essex County, New Jersey, United States. The company was founded by Franklin Murphy, who later created the Essex County park system as a New Jersey legislator, and served as the 31st governor of New Jersey from 1902 to 1905. The company closed in 1950.

One of the six buildings operated by the company in the Ironbound neighborhood was added to the National Register of Historic Places on March 9, 1979, but remained vacant until 2016, when Javier Meleiro, restored it and converted it into 46 rental apartments renamed as the Murphy Varnish Lofts.

== See also ==
- Chicago Varnish Company Building
- National Register of Historic Places listings in Essex County, New Jersey
