= List of crossings of the Lower Passaic River =

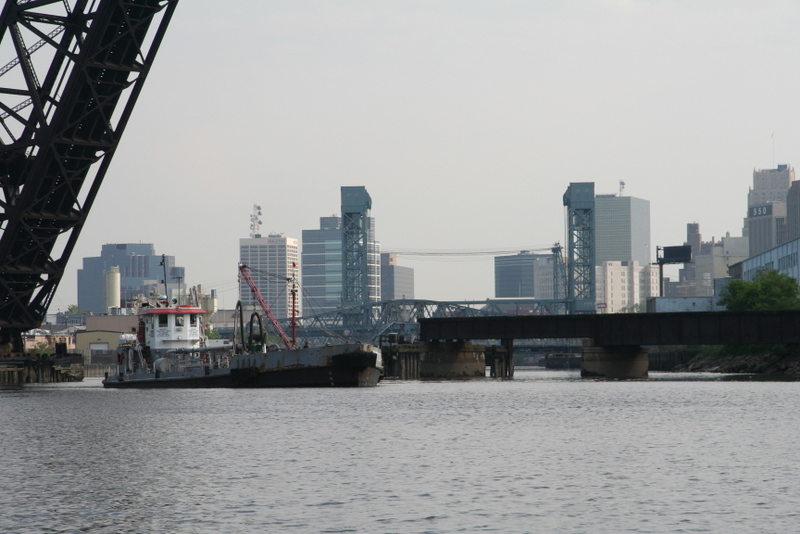
The NX, Clay Street, and Stickel bridges are seen in this view looking downstream, or south, to Newark Gateway.

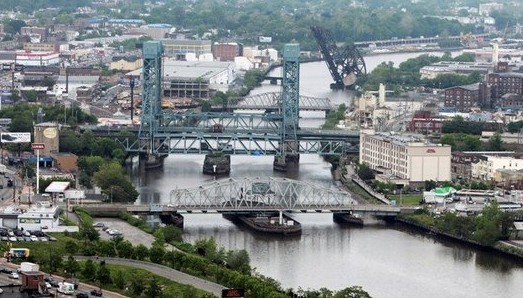
Five bridges over the Passaic River at Newark.

The Lower Passaic River in New Jersey is the section of the Passaic River below the Great Falls which flows over the Dundee Dam to the river mouth at Newark Bay in the northeastern part of the state. Its midpoint generally delineates the Essex–Hudson and Passaic–Bergen county lines. Numerous spans, mostly moveable bridges, have been built over of the lower reaches of the river, which is tidally influenced to the dam at about mile point (MP) 17.4 and channelized to about MP 17. Once one of the most heavily used waterways in the Port of New York and New Jersey, it remains partially navigable for commercial marine traffic. While requests have significantly diminished since the mid-late 20th century, the bridge at MP 11.7 and those downstream from it are required by federal regulations to open with advance notice, with the exception of the first at MP 1.8, which is staffed and opens on demand.

Early fixed crossings included turnpikes, sometimes built as plank roads. Wood, and later, metal bridges were constructed by competing railroads to access railyards, carfloat operations, passenger terminals, and ferries on the Hudson Waterfront. Rail lines led to further industrialization, urbanization-suburbanization, and the construction of vehicular bridges and streetcar lines. The advent of automobile age in the early and mid 20th century saw the building of highway bridges.

The Acquackanonk Bridge was dismantled in 1776 as George Washington retreated from Fort Lee. Another with the same name at the crossing was lost to flooding in 1903. The first railroad swing bridge in the United States was built in 1833. Numerous bridges have been demolished or fallen into disuse, while others have had their swing spans removed, replaced or immobilized. Some have been rebuilt or replaced.

== Crossings ==
MP	Crossing	Image	Open	Carries/Carried	Locale/Connecting	NBI	Coordinate	Notes	Reference
1.2	PD Draw (unused-swing span removed)		1869; 1912	Newark and New York Railroad (CNJ)	Kearny Point & Newark Ironbound		40°43′22″N 74°07′14″W	Swing span shifted to new alignment	
	Portway Bridge (proposed)			Doremus Avenue to Central/Pennsylvania Aves	Kearny Point & Port Newark		alignment undetermined	NJDOT to Wittpenn Bridge replacement	
1.8	Lincoln Highway Passaic River Bridge		1941	US 1-9 Truck milepoint 0.67; Lincoln Highway	Kearny Point & Newark Ironbound	0705151	40°43′57″N 74°07′04″W	East Coast Greenway; Raymond Boulevard; NJRHP	
	Newark Plank Road (removed)	1795 original 1941 last		Lincoln Highway; PS	Kearny Point & Newark Ironbound		40°43′58″N 74°07′04″W	Ferry Street; Communipaw Ave	
2.0	Pulaski Skyway		1932	US 1/9	Kearny Point & Newark Ironbound	0901150 (Hudson) 0704150 (Essex)	40°44′06″N 74°07′03″W	no trucks, bicycles, or peds NJRHP & NRHP	
2.6	Point-No-Point Bridge			Conrail; Passaic and Harsimus Line (CSX) (NS)	Kearny Meadows & Newark Ironbound		40°44′30″N 74°07′16″W	PRR	
2.7	Chaplain Washington Bridge		1952	NJ Turnpike Eastern Spur; I-95	Kearny Meadows & Newark Ironbound	W107870	40°44′31″N 74°07′22″W	no bicycles or pedestrians	
2.7	Harry Laderman Bridge		1970	NJ Turnpike Western Spur; I-95	Kearny Meadows & Newark Ironbound	E107880	40°44′31″N 74°07′23″W	no bicycles or pedestrians	
4.6	Jackson Street Bridge		1903	Jackson Street; Frank E. Rodgers Blvd	Harrison & Newark Ironbound	0700H02	40°44′02″N 74°09′19″W	NJRHP	
	Market Street Bridge (removed)		1868; 1899	NJRR; PRR	Harrison & Newark Penn		40°44′09″N 74°09′43″W	Swing span shifted to new alignment	
5.0	Dock Bridge (2 spans)		1935 (west); 1937 (east)	Northeast Corridor; Amtrak; Northeast Corridor Line (NJT); North Jersey Coast Line (NJT); Raritan Valley Line (NJT); PATH	Harrison & Newark Penn		40°44′10″N 74°09′41″W	PRR & H&M; NJRPH & NRHP	
	Centre Street Bridge (removed)		1834; 1911	New Jersey Railroad; PRR; H&M; Route 158	Harrison & Downtown Newark; Park Place Station		40°44′28″N 74°09′51″W	Upper level added Converted from rail to vehicular bridge 1927	
5.6	Bridge Street Bridge		1913	Bridge Street & Harrison Avenue; CR 508	Harrison & Downtown Newark	0700H03	40°44′43″N 74°09′57″W	NJRHP	
5.85	Newark Drawbridge		1903	Montclair-Boonton Line (NJT); Morristown Line (NJT); Gladstone Branch (NJT)	Harrison & Newark Broad Street Station		40°44′51″N 74°09′57″W	Morris and Essex Railroad (DL&W)	
5.9	William A. Stickel Memorial Bridge		1949	I-280	Harrison & Newark	0731161	40.7480°N 74.1659°W		
6.0	Clay Street Bridge		1908; 1976 rehab	Central Avenue; Clay Street	East Newark & Newark Broadway	0700H01	40°45′04″N 74°09′55″W		
6.35	NX Bridge (abandoned)		1922	Newark Branch (Erie)	Harrison/East Newark & Newark		40°45′16″N 74°09′51″W	Fixed open position	
8.1	WR Draw (unused)		1897	New York & Greenwood Lake (Erie); Boonton Line (NJT)	Arlington, Kearny & North Newark		40°46′36″N 74°09′01″W	Kearny Riverbank Park	
8.9	Belleville Turnpike Bridge		1790; 1841; 1914; 2002	Route 7 (Belleville Turnpike)	Arlington, Kearny & Belleville	0208150	40°47′11″N 74°08′51″W		
10.7	Kingsland Avenue Bridge		1905; 1986 rehab	Park Avenue to Kingsland Avenue	Nutley & Lyndhurst	NJ 0700B01; NJ 020032A	40°48′40″N 74°08′19″W	aka DeJessa Memorial Bridge or Park Avenue Bridge or Avondale Bridge	
11.7	Lyndhurst Draw		1903	Main Line (NJT); NS	Clifton Delawanna & Lyndhurst		40°49′14″N 74°07′36″W	DL&W & Erie; Boonton Branch; NJRHP	
	Route 3 Passaic River Crossing; Dual bridges		2014	Route 3 milepoint 4.95	Clifton & Rutherford/Lyndhurst	1601155; 1601164	40°49′23″N 74°07′26″W	NJDOT	
11.8	Old Route 3 Passaic River Bridge (demolished)		1949 demolished 2013		Clifton & Rutherford		40°49′23″N 74°07′26″W		
13.2	Union Avenue Bridge	1896 Bridge 2002 Bridge	1896; 2002 replace	Union Avenue	Route 21; Passaic & Rutherford	1600022	40°50′29″N 74°07′22″W	aka Douglas O. Mead Bridge; Swing removed and reconstructed (2002)	
	BE Draw (removed)		1833; 1897	Paterson and Hudson River Railroad (Erie); MP 10.22	Passaic-Passaic Park & Rutherford/Wallington; Carlton Hill		40°50′49″N 74°07′16″W	Erie Main Line until 1963	
14.0	Gregory Avenue Bridge		1906	Gregory Avenue to Paterson Avenue	Passaic & Wallington	1600002	40°51′15″N 74°07′11″W	aka Slomiany Memorial Bridge; Fixed closed position (1986); NJRHP	
	Acquackanonk Bridge (removed)		1741; 1776; 1835; 1863; 1890; 1905	Paterson Plank Road; Paterson, Passaic and Rutherford Electric Railway	Passaic & Wallington		40°51′18″N 74°07′12″W	burned 1776 destroyed in flood 1903	
14.7	Market Street Bridge aka Second Street Bridge		1930; 2002	Market Street Bridge	Passaic & Wallington	1600003	40°51′36″N 74°06′58″W	Fixed closed position (1977) swing removed & reconstructed (2002)	
15.3	Eighth Street Bridge		1915	Eighth Street; Main Avenue	Passaic & Wallington	1600004	40°51′19″N 74°06′34″W	Fixed closed position (1976); NJRHP	
	Passaic Street Bridge		1898; 1976 rehab	Wall Street; Passaic Street	Passaic & Garfield	020021C	40°51′53″N 74°06′36″W	NJRHP	
	Bergen County Short-Cut		1881 original	Dundee Spur (Erie); New York and Greenwood Lake Railway (1996)	Passaic & Garfield		40°52′07″N 74°06′44″W	connections to NS/Bergen County Line (NJT)	
	Monroe Street Bridge		1908	Monroe Street	Passaic & Garfield	02000I6; 020021D	40°52′08″N 74°06′45″W	1875–1878 bridge lost to flooding	
	Passaic Branch (removed)		1885	Passaic and New York Railroad (NYS&W)	Passaic & Garfield		40°52′23″N 74°06′54″W	Passaic Junction (rail yard); Botany Mills	
	Veterans Bridge			Ackerman Avenue; Outwater Lane	Clifton & Garfield	020021E	40°52′47″N 74°07′12″W	aka Robertsford Bridge; Dundee Canal Industrial Historic District	
17.4	Dundee Dam Lock (water navigation)		1861	n/a	Clifton & Garfield		40°53′01″N 74°07′36″W		
17.4	Dundee Canal Lock		1861	n/a	Clifton & Garfield		40°53′01″N 74°07′36″W	lock head gate	

== Abbreviations ==
- CNJ=Central Railroad of New Jersey
- CSXT=CSX Transportation
- DL&W=Delaware, Lackawanna and Western Railroad
- Erie=Erie Railroad
- H&M=Hudson and Manhattan Railroad
- NRHP=National Register of Historic Places
- NJDOT=New Jersey Department of Transportation
- NJRHP=New Jersey Register of Historic Places
- NJT=New Jersey Transit
- NYS&W=New York, Susquehanna and Western Railway
- NS=Norfolk Southern Railway
- PATH=Port Authority Trans-Hudson
- PRR=Pennsylvania Railroad
- PS=Public Service Railway

== See also ==
- List of crossings of the Upper Passaic River
- Timeline of Jersey City area railroads
- List of bridges, tunnels, and cuts in Hudson County, New Jersey
- List of crossings of the Hackensack River
- List of NJT moveable bridges
- List of fixed crossings of the North River (Hudson River)

== Sources ==
- "Lower Passaic River Restoration Project Commercial Navigation Analysis" (PDF). (2nd Revision). United States Army Corps of Engineers. July 2, 2010.
- "Historic Bridge Survey (1991–1994)". NJDOT. 2001.
- "New Jersey and National Registers of Historic Places". NJ DEP - State Historic Preservation Office.
- "Masonry and Metal The Historic Bridges of Bergen County, New Jersey" (PDF). Richard Grubb and Associates. 2008. Archived from the original (PDF) on July 10, 2012.
- "33 CFR 117.739 - Passaic River". Code of Federal Regulations. Coast Guard, Department of Homeland Security. Archived from the original on August 12, 2014. "updated to July 1, 2010"
- "Section 117.739 - Passaic River" (PDF). Code of Federal Regulations Title 33 - Navigation and Navigable Waters Volume: 1. Government Publishing Office. July 1, 2002.
- Report of the Assembly Committee Appointed to Inquire into the Condition of the Bridges over the Passaic and Hackensack Rivers in the Counties of Union, Essex, Hudson (Report). Trenton: New Jersey Assembly. 1865.
- "Bridges over the Passaic River". Passaic River Basin.
- "Drawbridge Schedules". NJDOT. April 12, 2012.
- "Bridgehunter: Passaic River".
- "Bridgesnyc".
- "FAQS about Recreational Boating on the Lower Passaic River". Passaic River Boat Club. Archived from the original on July 22, 2012.
- Jag9889 (August 5, 2007). "Passaic River Bridges". Flickr.
- "National Bridge Inventory Database". Archived from the original on February 2, 2019.
- "Passaic River, New Jersey" (PDF). Report of Channel Conditions 100 to 400 Feet Wide (ER 1130-2-306). US Army Corps of Engineers. September 14, 2010.
- "Route 3 Passaic River Crossing". NJDOT. August 11, 2011.
- "Acquakanonk Bridge". Revolutionary War in New Jersey.
- Olsen, Kevin K. (2008), A Great Conveniency A Maritime History of the Passaic River, Hackensack River, and Newark Bay, American History Imprints, ISBN 9780975366776
- DeLeuw, Cather and Company Engineering Science, Inc. (prepared for NJ Transit and NJDPA) (1991). Historic Railroad Bridge Survey (Report).
- Survey, U. S. Coast and Geodetic (May 8, 1918). "United States Coast Pilot: Atlantic Coast, Section B, Cape Cod to Sandy Hook". U.S. Government Printing Office – via Google Books.
