= Chaplain Washington and Harry Laderman Bridges =

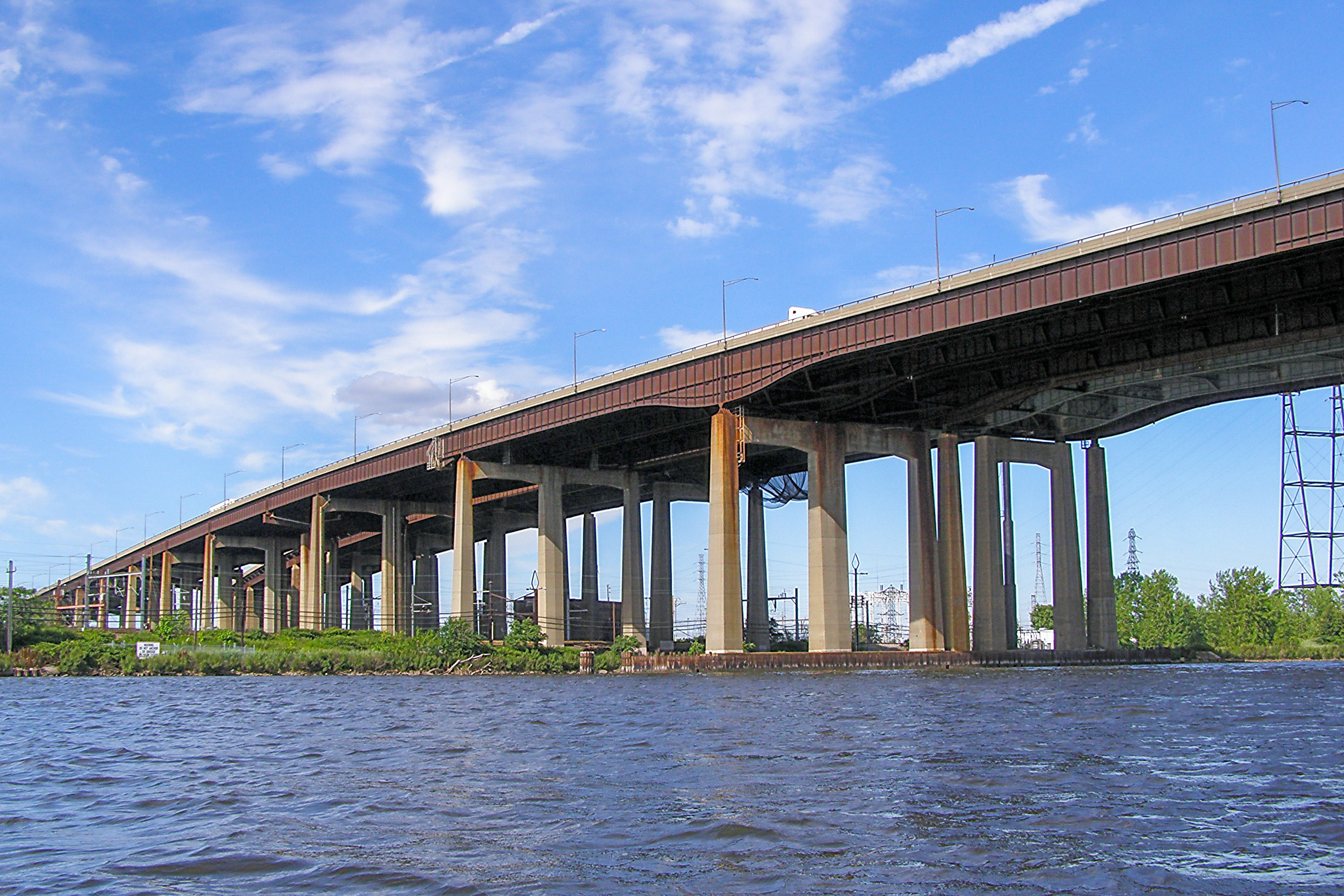
- The Harry Laderman and Chaplain Washington bridges in 2007, seen from the Passaic River looking downstream
- Coordinates: 40.7420489°N 74.1229440°W
- Carries: I-95 / N.J. Turnpike
- Crosses: Passaic River
- Locale: Kearny, New Jersey and Newark, New Jersey
- Other name(s): Washington & Laderman Memorial Bridge
- Named for: John P. Washington, U.S. Army lieutenant during World War II; Harry Laderman, late employee of the NJTA
- Owner: New Jersey Turnpike Authority (NJTA)
- Maintained by: NJTA

Characteristics
- Total length: 7,294 feet (2,223 m)
- Width: 104 feet (32 m)
- No. of lanes: 16 (8 on Washington Bridge, 8 on Laderman; 6 northbound, 6 southbound, 4 shoulder lanes)

History
- Opened: 1952 (Washington Bridge); 1970 (Laderman Bridge)

Location
- Interactive map of Chaplain Washington and Harry Laderman Bridges

The Chaplain Washington Memorial Bridge and the Harry Laderman Memorial Bridge are a pair of bridges on the New Jersey Turnpike (Interstate 95) crossing the Passaic River in northeastern New Jersey. Unlike most twin bridges, each bridge carries traffic in both directions: the 1952 Washington Bridge carries the eastern spur of the Turnpike while the 1970 Laderman Bridge carries its western spur. The two spurs split just south of the bridges, run adjacent over the river crossing, and then diverge just north of it.

== Description ==
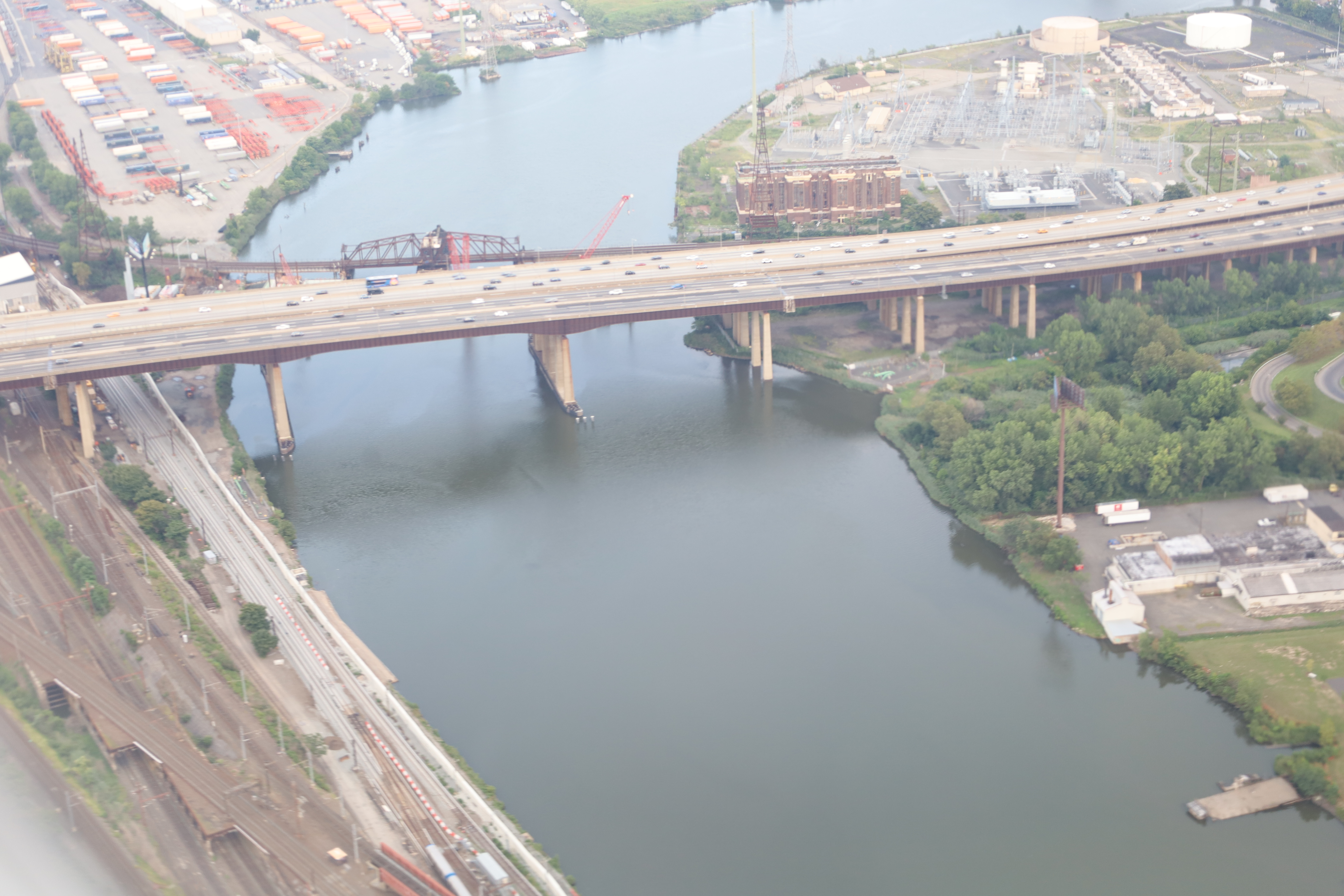
Aerial view in 2023

The bridges pass over the Passaic River, connecting Newark in Essex County with Kearny in Hudson County. In Newark, the viaducts leading to the bridges align for the southbound merge/northbound separation of the eastern and western spurs just north of the Southern Mixing Bowl interchange with Interstate 78. The southern end of the bridges cross under the Pulaski Skyway (U.S. 1-9) and passes by the Essex County Resource Recovery Facility and over the Conrail Passaic and Harsimus Line.

In Kearny, the bridges cross over the railroad right-of-way of the PATH system, the Conrail Center Street Branch, NJ Transit Rail Operations, and the Northeast Corridor. They soon enter the Kearny Marshes of New Jersey Meadowlands, where they diverge and soon cross over the Newark-Jersey City Turnpike (CR 508).

The Chaplain Washington Bridge ends before the Belleville Turnpike and the eastern spur briefly touches ground before ascending to cross the Hackensack on the Lewandowski Bridge. The Laderman Bridge reaches its northern end in Saw Mill Creek Wildlife Management Area at the Belleville Turnpike, and the western spur continues past Meadowlands Environment Center and the Meadowlands Sports Complex. The two spurs eventually merge again north of the Vince Lombardi Park & Ride across the Hackensack River in Bergen County.

== History ==
The Chaplain Washington Bridge was built in 1952 as part of the then-mainline route, now the eastern spur, of the New Jersey Turnpike. It is named after Lieutenant John P. Washington, who was one of 4 chaplains who gave their lives to save soldiers during the sinking of the SS Dorchester in World War II.

18 years later, the Harry Laderman bridge opened directly east of the Washington Bridge as part of the building of the turnpike's western spur extension. This bridge is named after toll booth operator Harry Laderman, an employee of the New Jersey Turnpike Authority who was killed on the job after a truck slammed into his toll booth at Exit 16E.

The NJTA estimates that both the Harry Laderman and Chaplain Washington bridges have the highest rate of truck traffic throughout the entire NJ Turnpike system of highways. The Laderman is rated as structurally deficient on the National Bridge Inventory condition rating scale with numerous cracks, flares, and structural fatigue. The NJTA announced plans in 2014 to rehabilitate the bridge and investigate the structural integrity of the bridge and how to repair it. As of 2019, the bridge’s rehabilitation was about 69 percent complete.

== Gallery ==
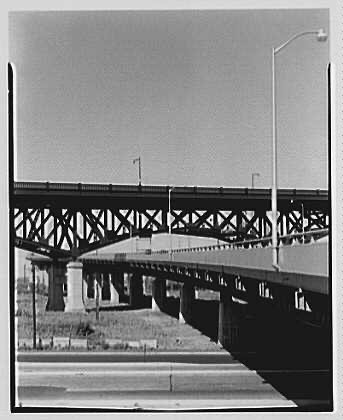
Chaplain Washington Bridge passing under the Pulaski Skyway (1952)

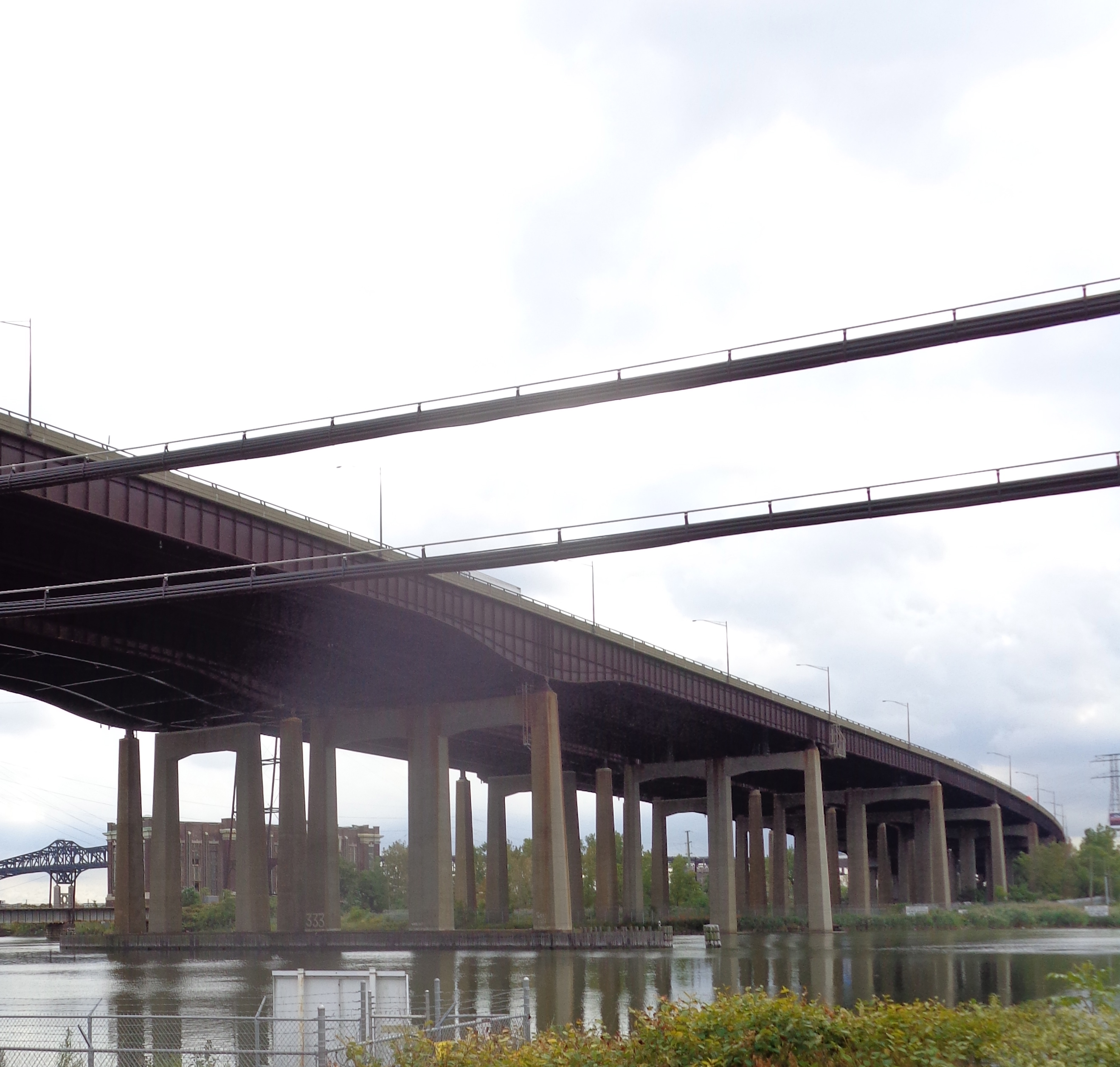
Laderman and Chaplain Washington bridges seen from PATH train

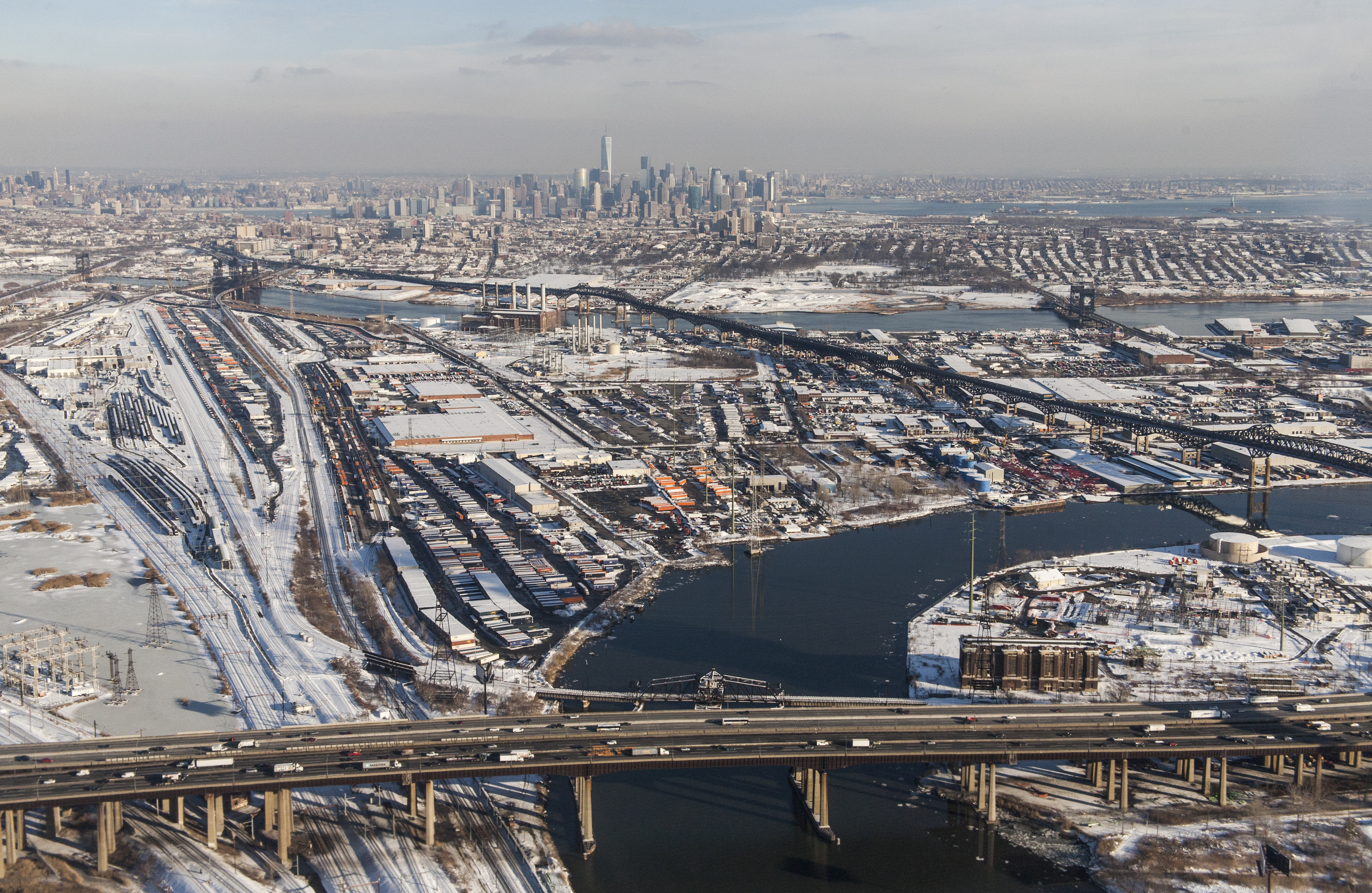
Crossing the Passaic and rail lines upstream of Point-No-Point Bridge

== See also ==
- List of bridges, tunnels, and cuts in Hudson County, New Jersey
- List of crossings of the Lower Passaic River
- List of crossings of the Upper Passaic River
