= Market Street Bridge (Passaic River) =

Market/2nd Street Bridge
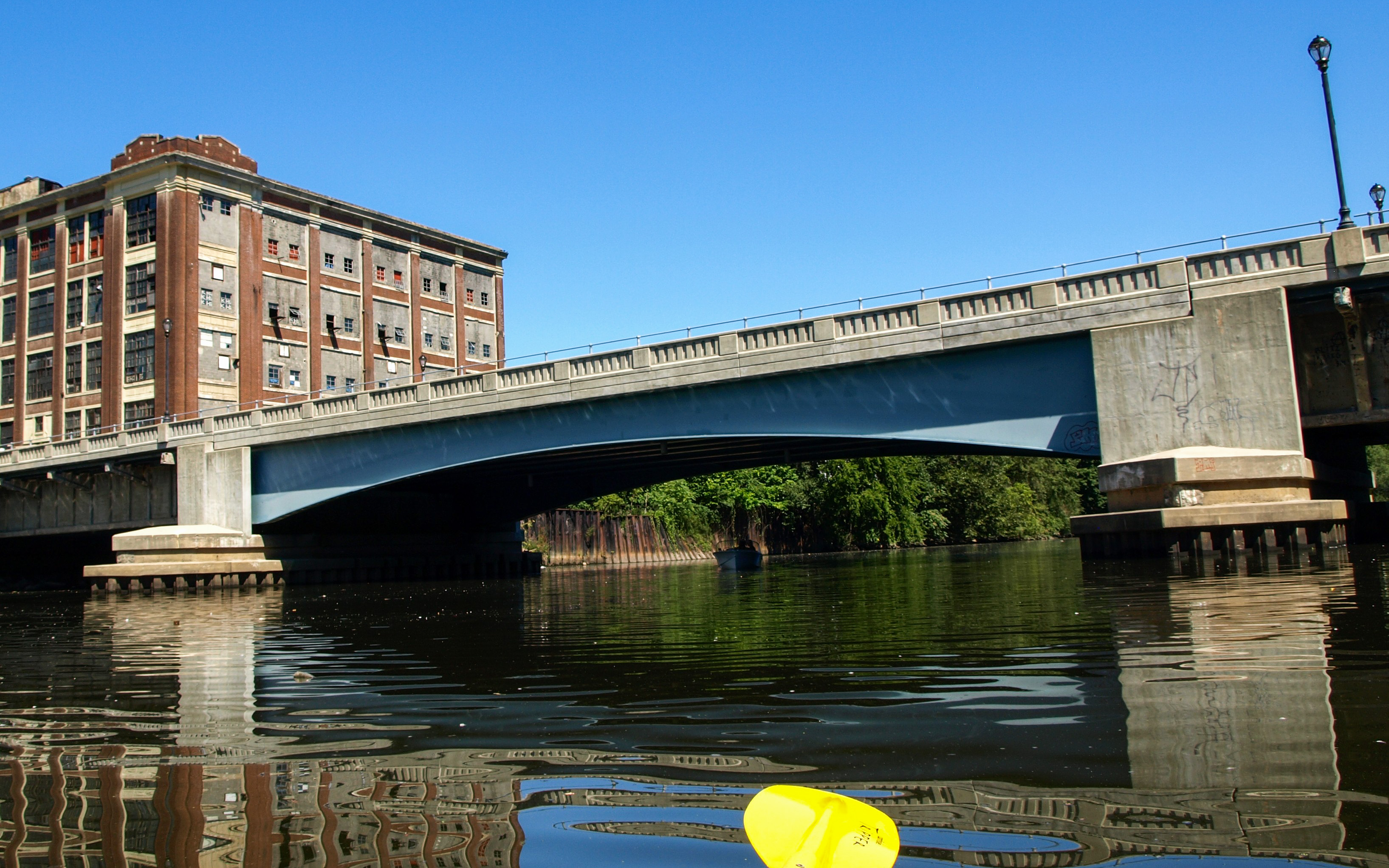
- Coordinates: 40°51′36″N 74°06′58″W
- Carries: Market Street (2nd Street); Wallington Avenue
- Crosses: Passaic River
- Locale: Passaic & Wallington; New Jersey
- Other name(s): 2nd Street Bridge
- Owner: Passaic County
- Maintained by: Passaic and Bergen
- ID number: 1600003
- Preceded by: 1894

Characteristics
- Design: double basule (fixed 1977)
- Material: Steel
- Total length: 307 feet (94 m)
- Width: 30 feet (9.1 m)
- No. of spans: 3

History
- Designer: Strauss Bascule Bridge Company
- Constructed by: F. W. Schwieres, Jr.
- Construction end: 1930; 1977; 2002

Market Street Bridge, also known as the Second Street Bridge, is a vehicular bridge over the Passaic River crossing the Passaic-Bergen county line in Passaic and Wallington in northeastern New Jersey. The double-leaf bascule bridge was built in 1930 and fixed in the closed position in 1977. It was reconstructed in 2002. It carries a two-lane street and sidewalks in a late-19th and early-20th century industrial area along the river. An earlier structure built at the crossing in 1894 was damaged during the Passaic floods of 1902 and 1903 but survived.

It is one of three bridges crossing the river between the two municipalities, the others being the Gregory Avenue Bridge and the Eighth Street Bridge. Two other crossings of the Passaic have been known as Market Street Bridge, the since-removed Pennsylvania Railroad bridge at Newark Penn Station and the extant vehicular bridge at Paterson.

== See also ==
- Market Street Bridge (disambiguation)
- List of crossings of the Lower Passaic River
- List of crossings of the Hackensack River
- List of NJT moveable bridges
- List of fixed crossings of the North River (Hudson River)
