= Dock Bridge =

Vertical lift bridges in New Jersey

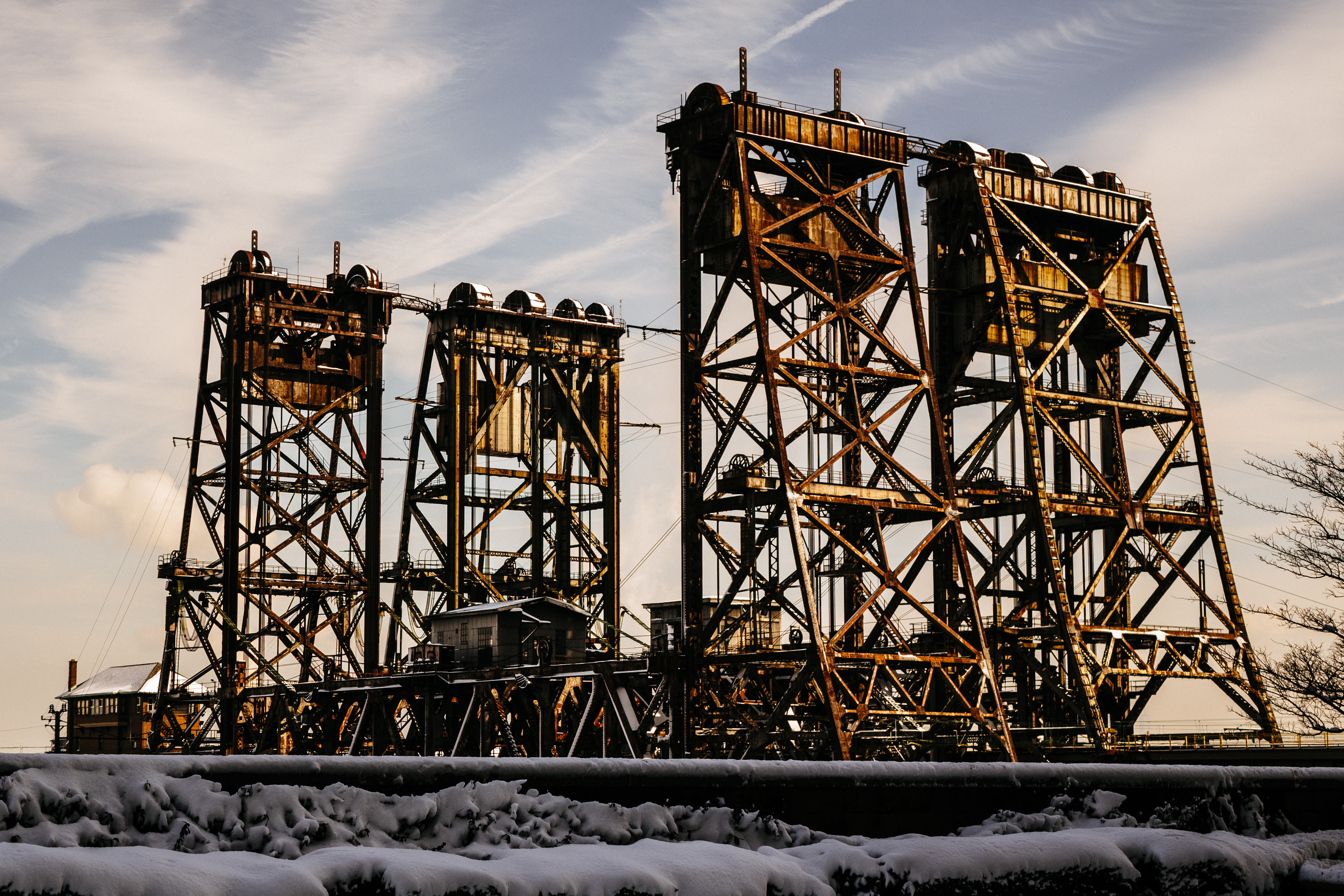
- The bridge in 2014
- Coordinates: 40°44′09″N 74°09′43″W
- Carries: Amtrak, NJ Transit (both spans) and PATH (east span only)
- Crosses: Passaic River

Characteristics
- Design: Pair of through-truss vertical lift bridges
- Clearance below: 24 ft (7.32 m) (closed); 135 ft (41.15 m) (open)

Rail characteristics
- No. of tracks: 3 (West span); 3 (East span)
- Track gauge: 4 ft 8 1/2 in (1,435 mm) standard gauge
- Structure gauge: AAR
- Dock Bridge
- U.S. National Register of Historic Places
- New Jersey Register of Historic Places
- Location: Passaic River; Newark - Harrison; New Jersey
- Area: 1 acre (0.40 ha)
- Built: 1935
- Architects: Waddell & Hardesty; Waddell, Dr.J.A.L.
- Architectural style: Through-Truss Lift Bridge
- NRHP reference No.: 80002484, 12000951
- NJRHP No.: 1227

Significant dates
- Added to NRHP: October 3, 1980
- Designated NJRHP: July 21, 1979

Location
- Interactive map of Dock Bridge

The Dock Bridge or Amtrak Dock Vertical Lift is a pair of vertical-lift bridges carrying Amtrak, NJ Transit, and PATH trains across the Passaic River between Newark and Harrison, New Jersey. It is the seventh crossing from the river's mouth at Newark Bay and is 5.0 miles (8.0 km) upstream from it. They are the only vertical lift bridges on the Northeast Corridor. It is listed on the National and New Jersey Registers of Historic Places.

== History ==
The bridge was built by the Pennsylvania Railroad (PRR) for its main line. The west span opened in 1935 along with the west half of Newark Penn Station. The 230-foot (70 m) lift span was the longest three-track lift span in the world when built. The east spans opened in 1937 when the Hudson and Manhattan Railroad (H&M, later called PATH) shifted its rapid-transit trains from the Centre Street Bridge to the newly built station. With the opening of the eastern span, the PRR closed Manhattan Transfer station in the Kearny Meadows, where previously steam and electrical trains were changed and passengers could transfer to trains to New York Penn Station on the PRR or to Hudson Terminal on the H&M.

It is infrequently lifted and, prior to 2014, had not received a request for a river traffic opening since 2004. In 2011 regulations were changed so that it need not be open on demand (as it previously had) but with a 24-hour notice. During four-year removal of dredged materials from the Passaic the bridge is expected to open upwards of 10 times per day. In 2020 Amtrak requested that bridge remain in closed position until such time as it can be rehabilitated. Amtrak requested permission from the United States Coast Guard in January 2025 to keep the bridge lowered for 120 days; the railroad ultimately wanted to keeping it lowered permanently, so trains could traverse the bridge without delays.

In 2023, the federal government provided a $300 million grant for the rehabilitation of the Dock Bridge, and Amtrak agreed to provide $75 million in matching funds. The renovation included repainting, repairing structural steel, replacing the wooden fenders around the bridge's support piers, and adding a cathodic system to reduce the corrosion of the piers. In April 2025, U.S. Transportation Secretary Sean Duffy announced plans to reduce the project cost by $140 million. In August 2026, Skanska was awarded a $90 million contract to carry out the rehabilitation work, with LiRo-Hill as project manager. The total budget of the project is $242 million, funded primarily by a $188 million grant from the Federal Railroad Administration (FRA). Work began that month.

== Description ==
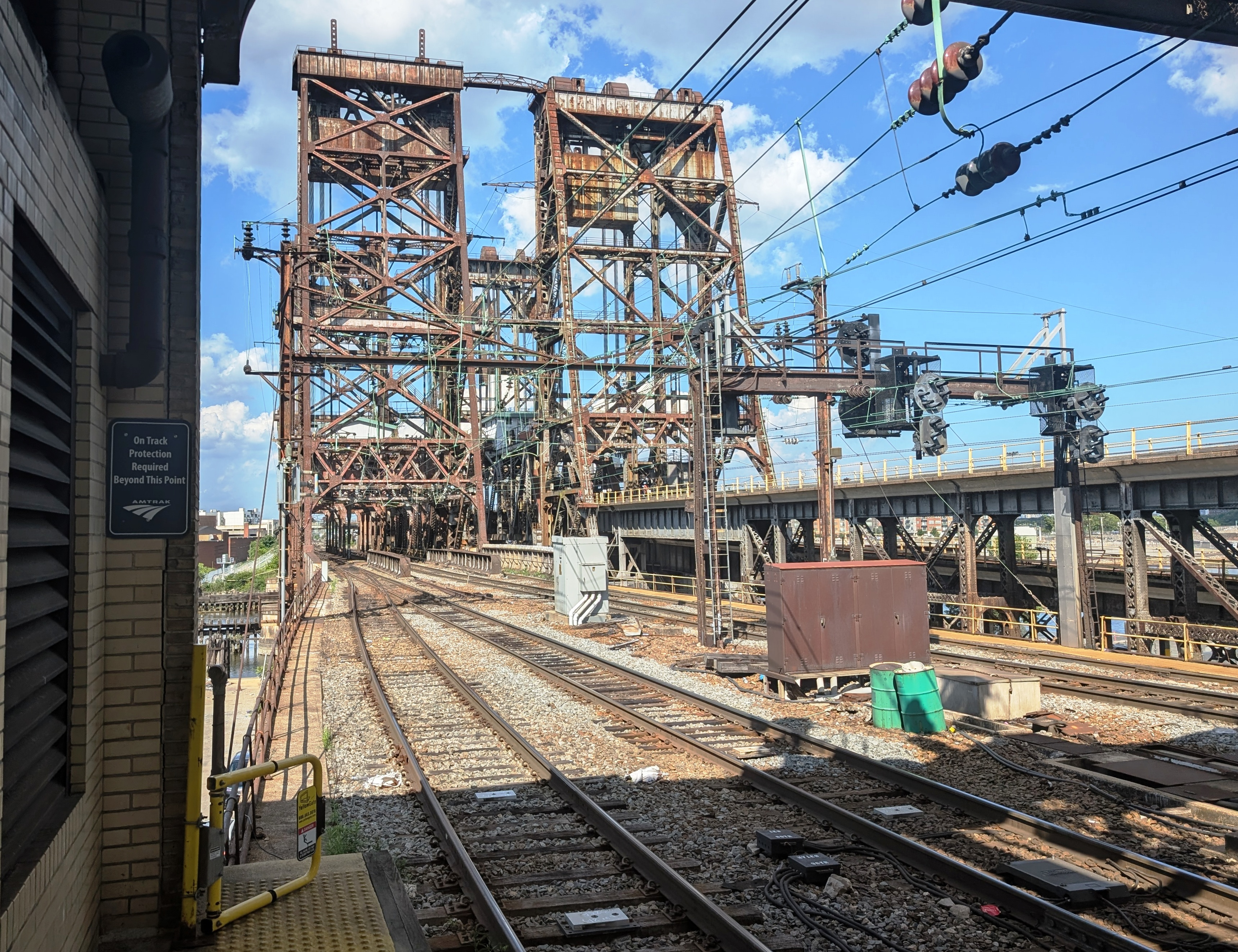
The three tracks approaching Bridge A are in the foreground, with the higher PATH line approaching Bridge B behind it.

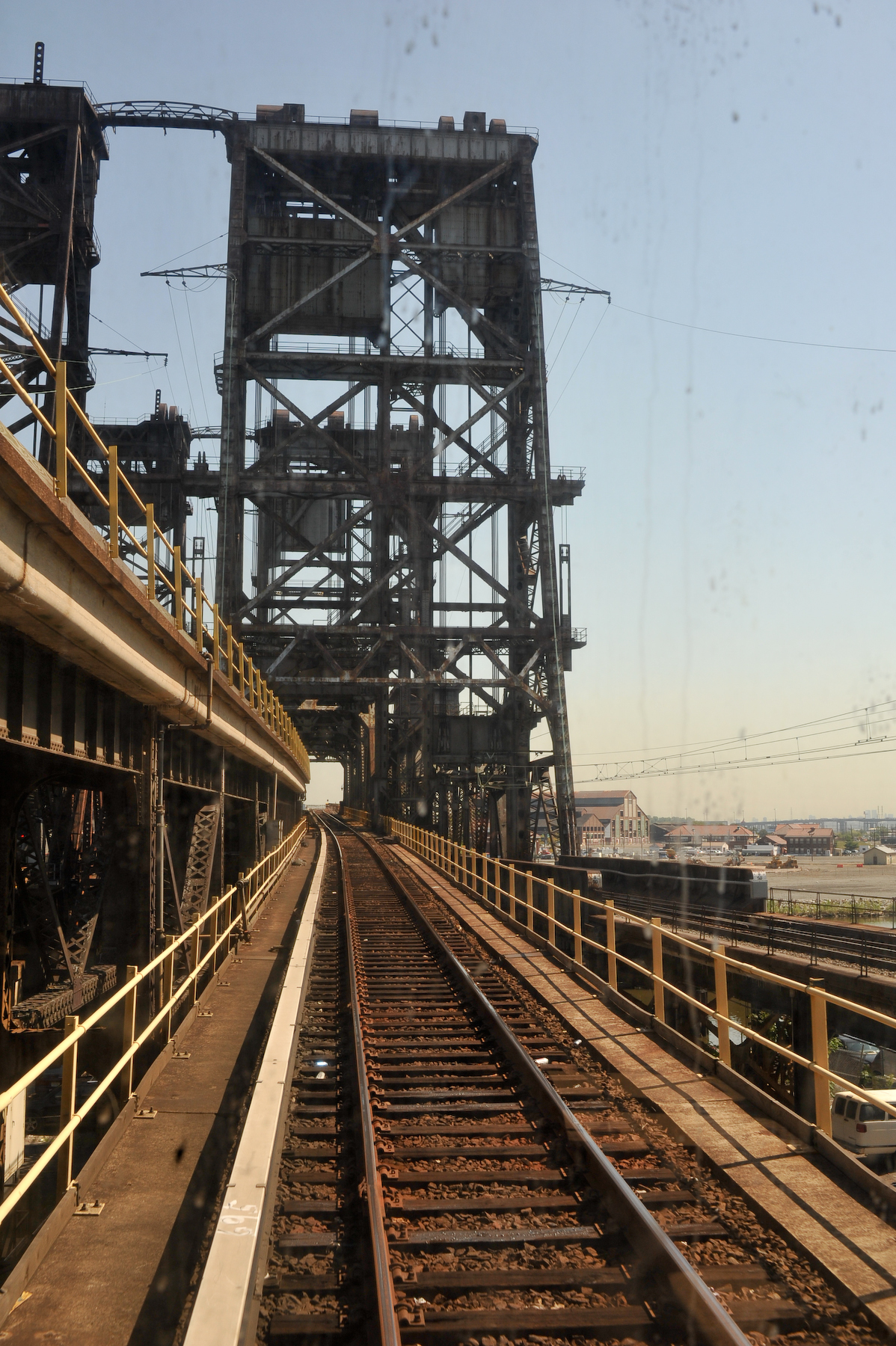
The tracks at left and center are the PATH line approach to Bridge B; the track approaching Bridge C is barely visible at right.

The west bridge (Bridge A) carries three tracks exclusively used by Amtrak and NJ Transit for Northeast Corridor intercity and commuter traffic. The east span carries two independent moveable spans: Bridge B for two rapid-transit tracks used by PATH's Newark-World Trade Center service, and Bridge C for one NEC track shared by Amtrak and NJ Transit. The PATH span is at a higher level than the NEC tracks so that it would not have to be lifted as often, given the higher frequency of H&M (now PATH) trains over PRR (now Amtrak and NJ Transit) trains.

Due partly to its use of the Dock Bridge, PATH is legally a commuter railroad under the jurisdiction of the FRA, even though it has long operated as a rapid-transit system.

The moveable span is required because the lower 17 miles (27 km) of the Passaic River below the Dundee Dam is tidally influenced and navigable. The lift span is 230 feet (70 m) over bearings (clear channel 200 feet or 61 meters). When closed the bridge has a vertical clearance of 24 feet (7.3 m) above mean high water and opens to clear 135 ft (41 m).

== See also ==
- Gateway Project, regional transportation improvement project
- List of crossings of the Lower Passaic River
- List of bridges, tunnels, and cuts in Hudson County, New Jersey
- List of NJT movable bridges
- National Register of Historic Places listings in Essex County, New Jersey
- National Register of Historic Places listings in Hudson County, New Jersey
- List of bridges on the National Register of Historic Places in New Jersey
