= Monroe Street Bridge =

Monroe Street Bridge may refer to:

- Monroe Street Bridge (Chicago River), a bridge in downtown Chicago, Illinois, United States
- Monroe Street Bridge (Passaic River), a bridge in Passaic and Garfield, New Jersey, United States
- Monroe Street Bridge (Spokane River), a bridge in Spokane, Washington, United States
