= Point-No-Point Bridge =

Bridge in United States of America

- Coordinates: 40°44′30″N 74°07′17″W
- Carries: Passaic and Harsimus Line
- Crosses: Passaic River
- Locale: Newark and Kearny; New Jersey
- Owner: Conrail

Characteristics
- Design: Bascule bridge

History
- Construction start: 2022
- Construction end: 2025
- Construction cost: $200 million
- Opened: November 17, 2025

Location
- Interactive map of Point-No-Point Bridge

Point-No-Point Bridge is a railroad bridge crossing the Passaic River between Newark and Kearny, New Jersey, United States, in the New Jersey Meadowlands. Originally a swing bridge built by the Pennsylvania Railroad in 1901, a replacement bascule bridge was built closely upstream and opened in 2025. The bridge is owned by Conrail as part of its North Jersey Shared Assets and carries the Passaic and Harsimus Line used by CSX Transportation and Norfolk Southern. River Subdivision accesses the line via Marion Junction. The bridge is the fourth from the river's mouth at Newark Bay and is approximately 2.6 miles (4.2 km) upstream from it.

== Replacement span ==
The replacement span is a single-leaf bascule bridge. Conrail was responsible for the replacement; work began in July 2022 and completed on November 17, 2025. The new span can be opened and closed within 12 minutes, compared to the over five hours for the original span. The total construction cost was $200 million, with over $78 million of it covered by grants from the NJDOT and FRA.

== Original span ==
Point-No-Point Bridge
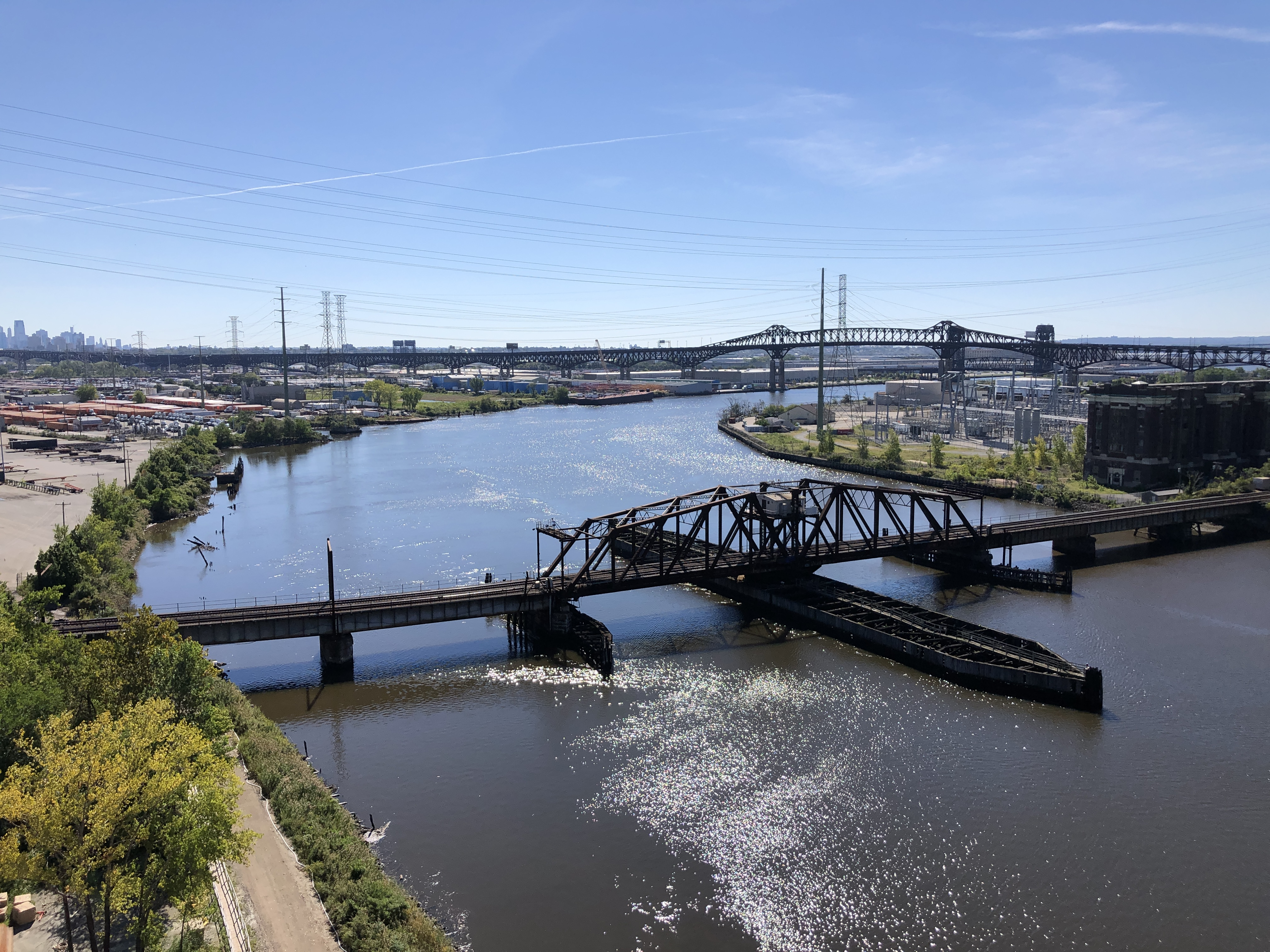
- The original Point-No-Point Bridge (foreground) and Pulaski Skyway (background)
- Coordinates: 40°44′29″N 74°07′17″W
- Carries: Passaic and Harsimus Line
- Crosses: Passaic River
- Locale: Newark and Kearny; New Jersey
- Owner: Conrail

Characteristics
- Design: Swing bridge
- Clearance below: 21 feet (6.4 m)

History
- Construction end: 1901
- Closed: November 17, 2025

Location
- Interactive map of Point-No-Point Bridge

The original bridge was a camelback through truss bridge. A crossing of the Passaic at Point-No-Point was originally built by the Pennsylvania Railroad (PRR) in the early 1890s to bypass its mainline and thus shorten the distance to its rail yard at Harsimus Cove. At the time the railroad crossed the Passaic at the Centre Street Bridge (no longer in existence) near its Newark station, at the site of today's New Jersey Performing Arts Center. The new Pennsylvania Cut-off diverged from the line (now today's Northeast Corridor) at Waverly Yard, crossed the Newark Ironbound and the Passaic to the Kearny Meadows and then crossed the Hackensack River on the Harsimus Branch Lift Bridge. It rejoined the main line at the Bergen Hill Cut, but diverged again using the Harsimus Stem Embankment to reach its freight yards on the Hudson River waterfront north of its passenger terminal at Exchange Place. The PRR also used the Lehigh Valley Railroad Bridge to reach its car float operations at Greenville Yard on the Upper New York Bay.

The Point-No-Point Bridge's creosote-covered piers caught fire in 2000.

The lower 17 miles (27 km) of the 90-mile-long (140 km) Passaic River below the Dundee Dam is tidally influenced and navigable commercial maritime traffic upstream of the Point-No-Point Bridge is constricted by the width between its piers when the moveable span is open. Rules regulating the drawbridge operations determined by the US Coast Guard required 4 hours' notice for it to be swung open.

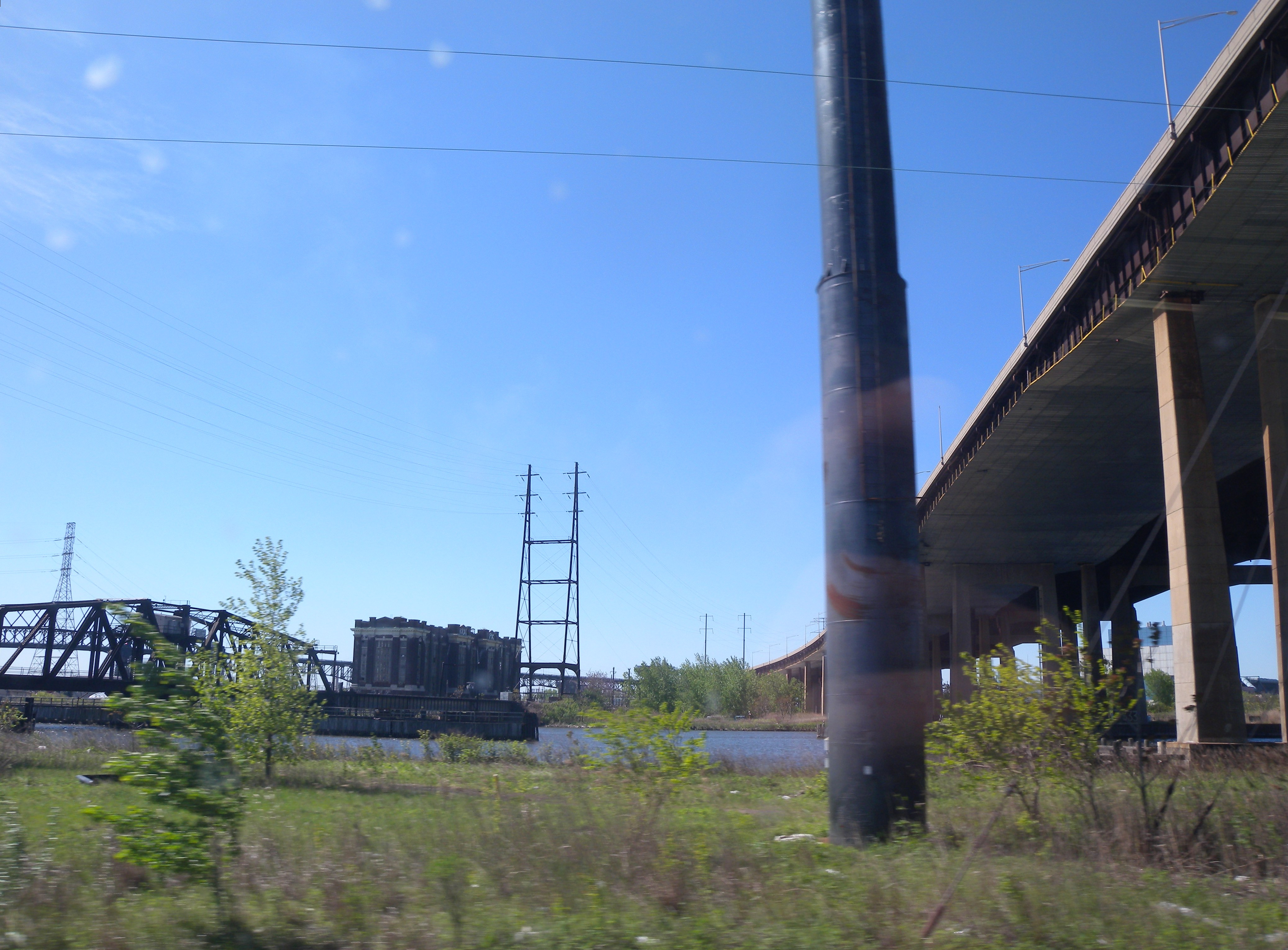
The old bridge (at left) crosses the Passaic between the Kearny Meadows and the industrial area of the Newark Ironbound parallel to the New Jersey Turnpike

== See also ==
- List of bridges, tunnels, and cuts in Hudson County, New Jersey
- Timeline of Jersey City, New Jersey-area railroads
- List of crossings of the Lower Passaic River
- Marion Junction (New Jersey)
- Oak Island Yard
