= Gregory Avenue Bridge =

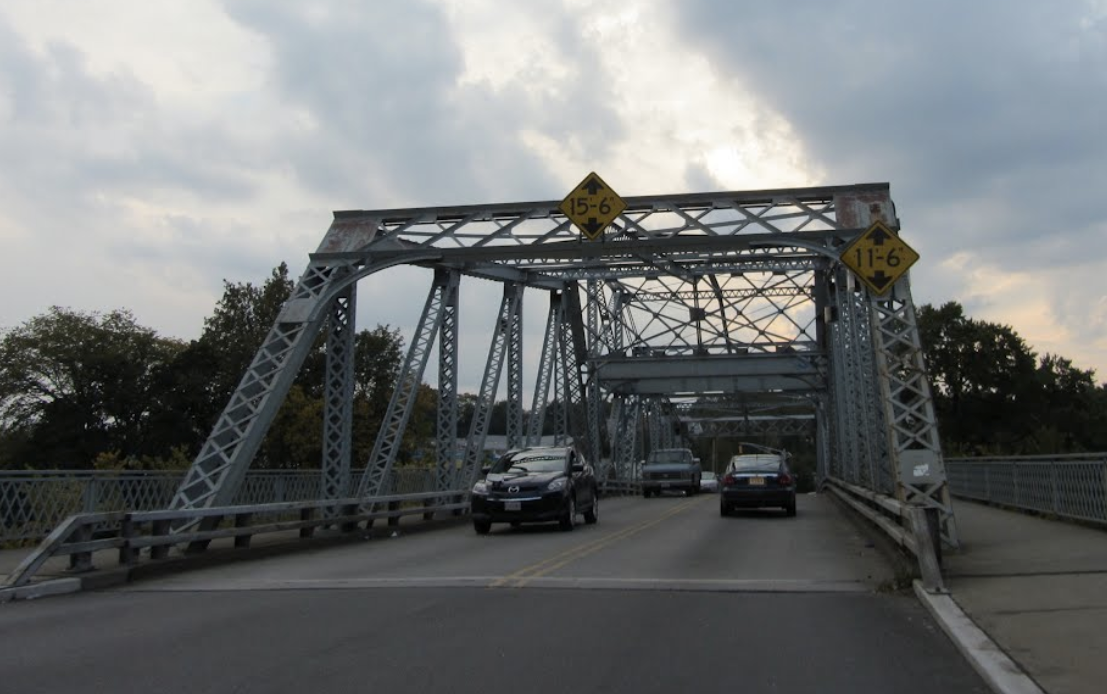
- Coordinates: 40°51′15″N 74°07′10″W
- Carries: CR 601 / CR 120
- Crosses: Passaic River
- Locale: Passaic & Wallington; New Jersey
- Other name: Main Avenue Bridge
- Owner: Passaic County and Bergen County
- Maintained by: Passaic and Bergen
- ID number: 1600002
- Preceded by: 1741–66; 1766–76 (rebuilt)-1788 1788–1835; 1835–65; 1863–90; 1890–1904

Characteristics
- Design: Swing; Through truss
- Material: Steel
- Total length: 288 feet (88 m)
- Width: 28.8 feet (8.8 m)
- No. of spans: 2

History
- Constructed by: Owego Bridge Company
- Construction start: 1906

Location
- Interactive map of Gregory Avenue Bridge

Gregory Avenue Bridge, earlier known as the Main Avenue Bridge, is road bridge over the Passaic River in northeastern New Jersey, United States. It is the 7th bridge to be built at the river crossing. Originally built in 1905 as a moveable bridge, it has been in a fixed closed position since 1985. A four lane road carries traffic between Passaic & Wallington at the Passaic and Bergen county line.

== Location and operations ==
The lower 17 miles (27 km) of the 90-mile-long (140 km) Passaic River downstream of the Dundee Dam is tidally influenced and channelized. Once one of the most heavily used waterways in the Port of New York and New Jersey, it remains partially navigable for commercial marine traffic. The bridge has been in fixed closed position since 1977 and only bridge at MP 11.7 and those downstream from it are required by federal regulations to open.

== Acquackanonk Bridge ==
The City of Passaic was originally part of Acquackanonk, and the area which would become Wallington, across the Passaic River, was a plantation owned by Walling Van Winkle.

The first Acquackanonk Bridge, built sometime before 1741 during the colonial era, was a foot bridge that crossed from Passaic just upstream of the location of the Gregory Avenue Bridge A second wooden bridge built from 1766 and was burned during Washington's 1776 Great Retreat from Fort Lee during the American Revolution. A nearby tavern was Washington's headquarters.

Another replacement was built in 1776, followed by three others which existed in the periods 1835–65, 1863–90, and 1890–1904.

== Paterson Plank Road ==
Paterson Plank Road was completed over the crossing in 1841. The company which built the Paterson and New York Plank Road, as it was called, received its charter on March 14, 1851. Over time it was upgraded and at one point had streetcar lines on its entire length operated by the Public Service Railway as the 15 Passaic, 17 Hudson, and 35 Secaucus.

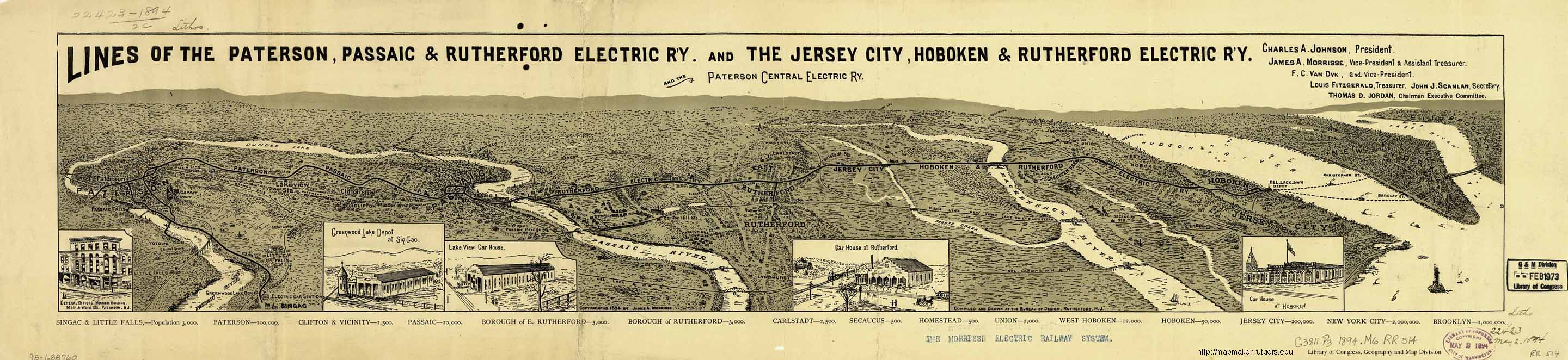
Panoramic map showing the trolley system that largely followed the Paterson Plank Road over the Hackensack and Passaic

== Design, construction, adaptions ==
The Main Avenue (or Gregory Avenue) Bridge was built in 1906 by the Oswego Bridge Company. It is a swing bridge thru truss rim-bearing swing bridge that rests on ashlar abutments, and carries two vehicular lanes and two sidewalks. Most of the bridge is riveted together, but the center tower uses eyebars in its construction. In 1985 both the operator's house on the bridge and the machinery below it were removed. The bridge deck was also replaced at the same time.

== See also ==
- List of crossings of the Lower Passaic River
- List of crossings of the Hackensack River
