= Passaic and Harsimus Line =

Freight rail line in northeastern New Jersey, USA

The Passaic and Harsimus Line, part of Conrail Shared Assets Operations, serves freight in northeastern New Jersey. It takes trains from the Northeast Corridor and Lehigh Line near Newark Liberty International Airport northeast and east into Jersey City. It is part of CSX's main corridor connecting upstate New York to the rest of the east coast.

== History ==
The P&H Line, before passing to Conrail, was the Pennsylvania Railroad's exclusively freight line which bypassed its main line in Newark, South Kearny, and ran parallel to through Jersey City. Its were originally two components. The Waverly and Passaic Branch went through industrial Newark, over the Passaic River, through the Kearny Meadows to the Hackensack River. The Harsimus Branch crossed the river and passed through Bergen Hill and atop the Harsimus Stem Embankment to Harsimus Cove and its Hudson Waterfront freight operations (part of which have become the office complex Harborside).

== Route description ==
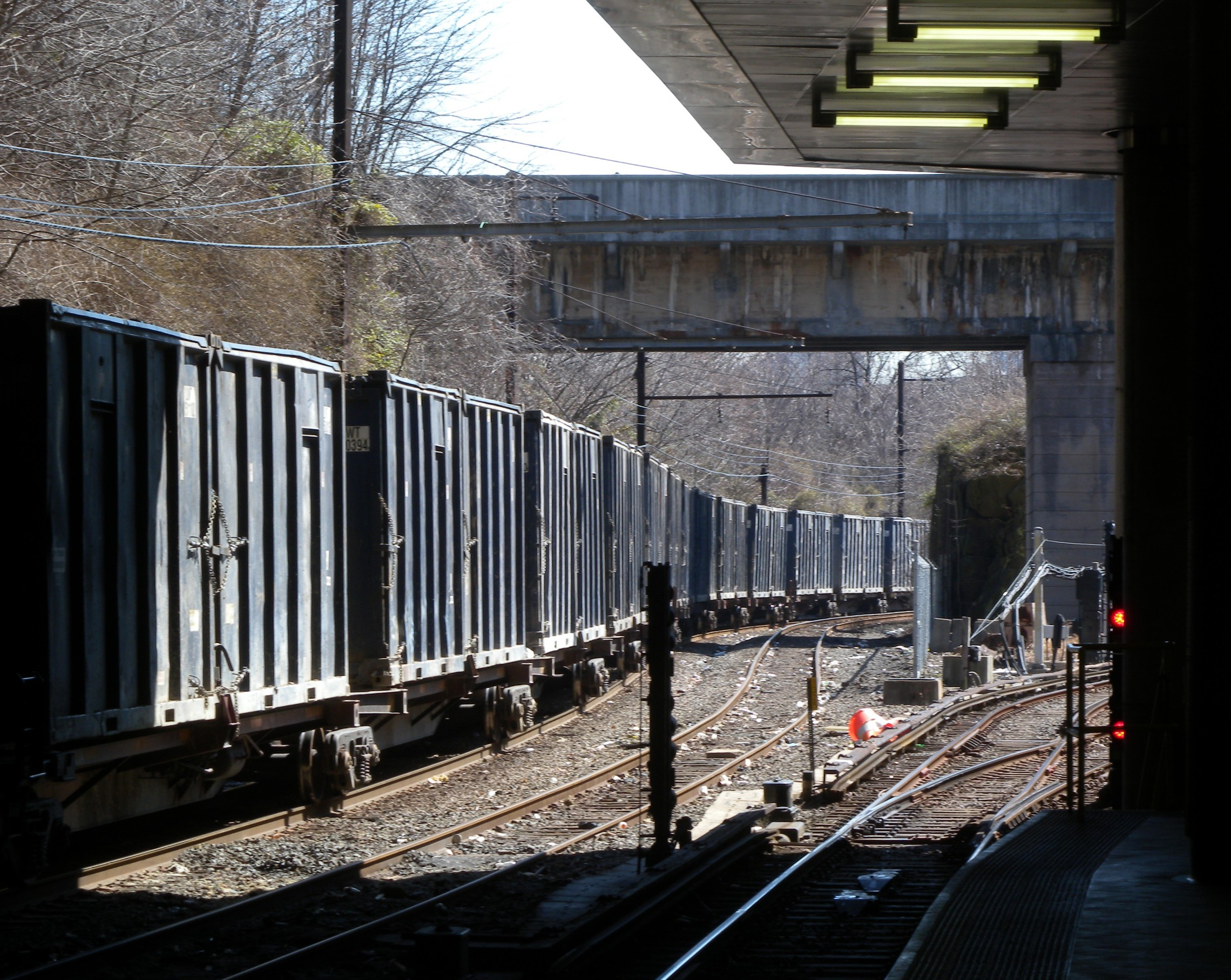
Waldo Running Track through Journal Square

The line begins at a junction with Amtrak's Northeast Corridor at Lane Interlocking 40.69188°N 74.1982°W. near Waverly Yard 40.695856°N 74.194566°W. It runs next to the Northeast Corridor, just to the east, along what was originally Track 0 (the old P&H Branch east of the yard is now abandoned).

After about a mile, the Greenville Secondary splits to the east to the Lehigh Valley Railroad Bridge, and the P&H Line passes under the Lehigh Line and turns east. Access to the Lehigh Line eastbound is provided from the Greenville Branch via a track into the Oak Island Yard 40.70867°N 74.138103°W; another track leaves the Oak Island Yard to join the P&H Line headed northbound.

After crossing the Passaic River on the Point-No-Point Bridge 40.741672°N 74.121095°W, the P&H Line passes over PATH and turns east, parallel to PATH. A track splitting just before the overpass accesses the area south of PATH. The P&H Line then heads east through Kearny Meadows and then across the Harsimus Branch Lift Bridge over the Hackensack River to Marion Junction 40.737665°N 74.07372°W, where the Northern Running Track goes north, with most rail traffic.

The P&H Line past Marion Junction is now a secondary connection known as the Waldo Running Track. It passes through the Journal Square Transportation Center 40.732141°N 74.063114°W and terminates, mainly being used for train storage at Waldo Yard. The line formerly had a connection to the New Jersey Junction Railroad/River Line that was constructed by Conrail in the late 1960s or 1970s, and was abandoned in 2000.

== Harsimus Branch Lift ==
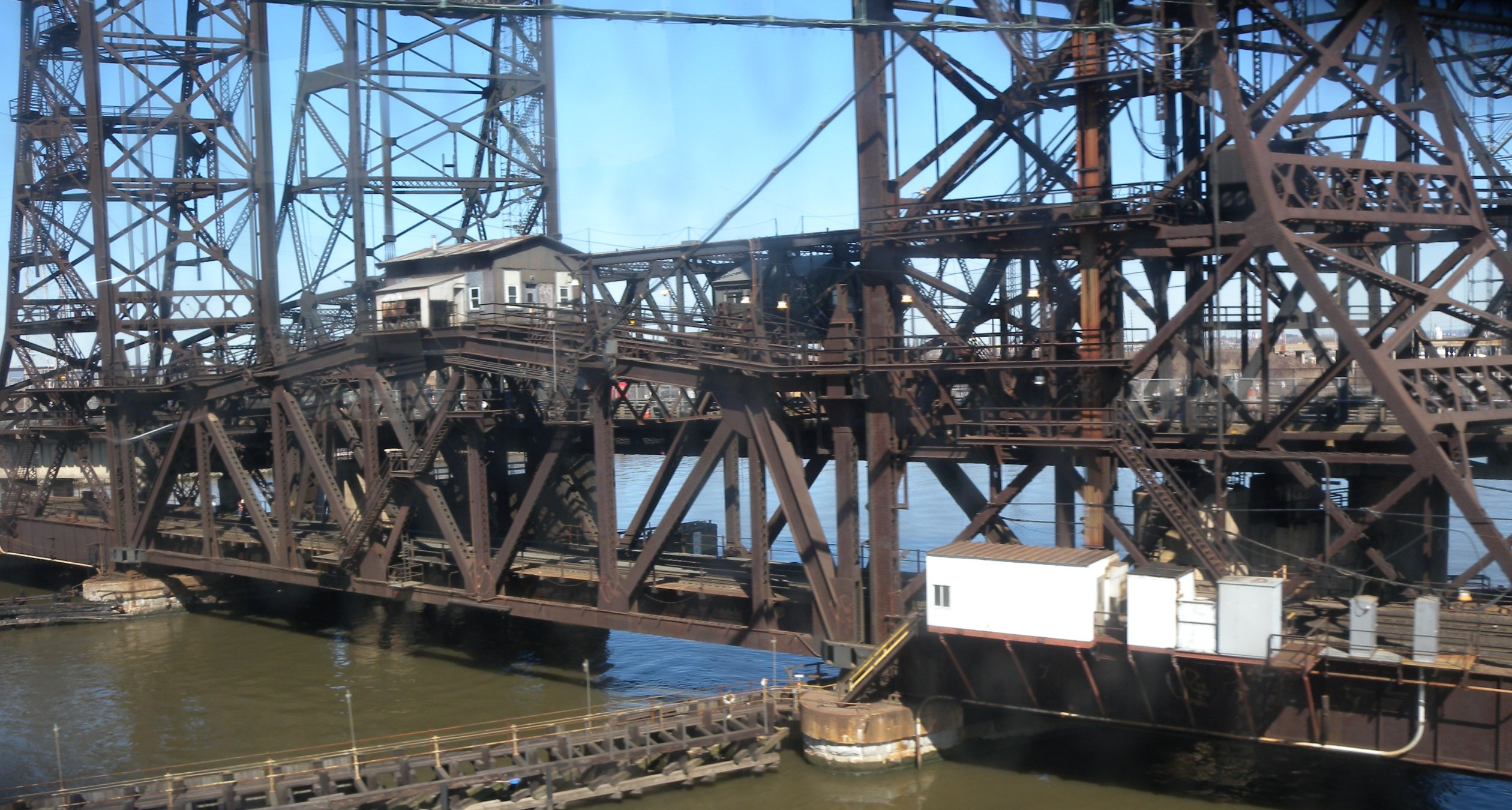
Harsimus Branch Lift Bridge over the Hackensack River in 2010, with the original Wittpenn Bridge (since replaced) behind it

The Harsimus Branch Lift is the branch's crossing of the Hackensack River. It is a vertical-lift bridge that opened in 1930, replacing a series of earlier bridges dating back to 1846.

== Gallery ==
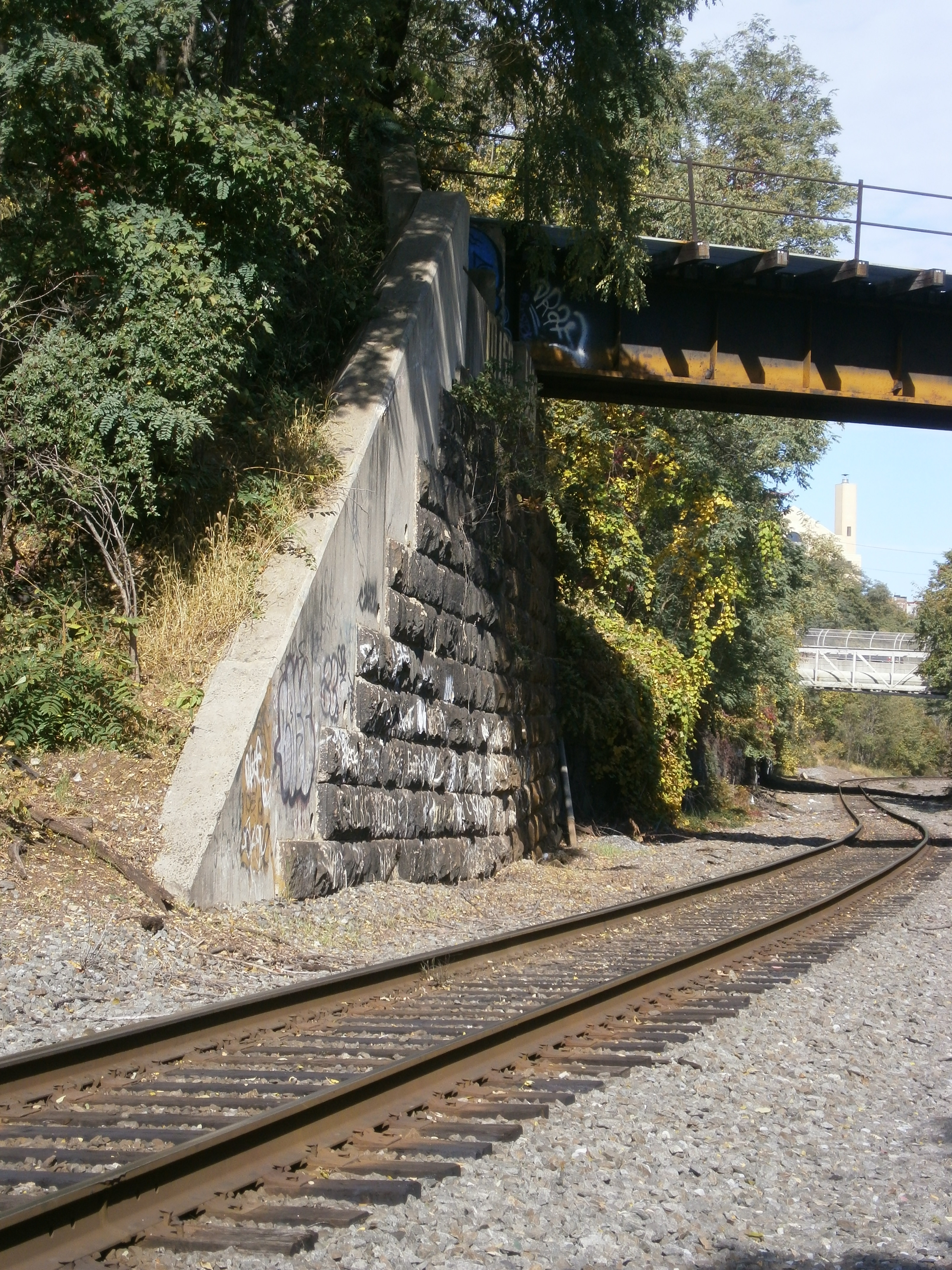
At the eastern end of the Bergen Hill Cut, the P&H crosses over the National Docks Secondary

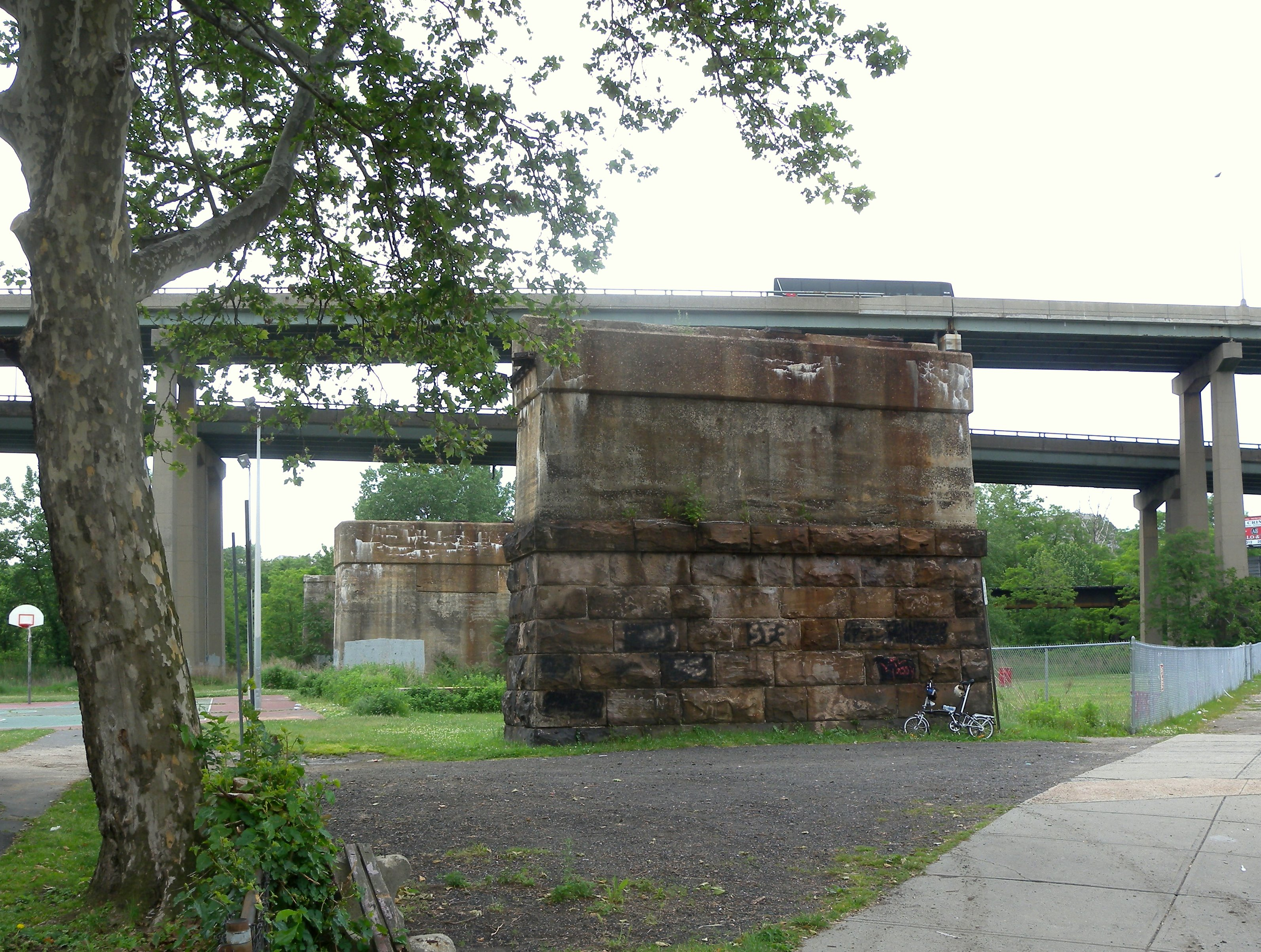
Remaining abutments of the line to former yards near the Hudson River

== See also ==
- Timeline of Jersey City area railroads
- National Docks Secondary
- List of historical passenger rail services serving New York City
- List of bridges, tunnels, and cuts in Hudson County, New Jersey
- List of bridges documented by the Historic American Engineering Record in New Jersey
