= South Kearny, New Jersey =

Populated place in Hudson County, New Jersey, US

Coordinates: 40°43′42″N 74°06′22″W

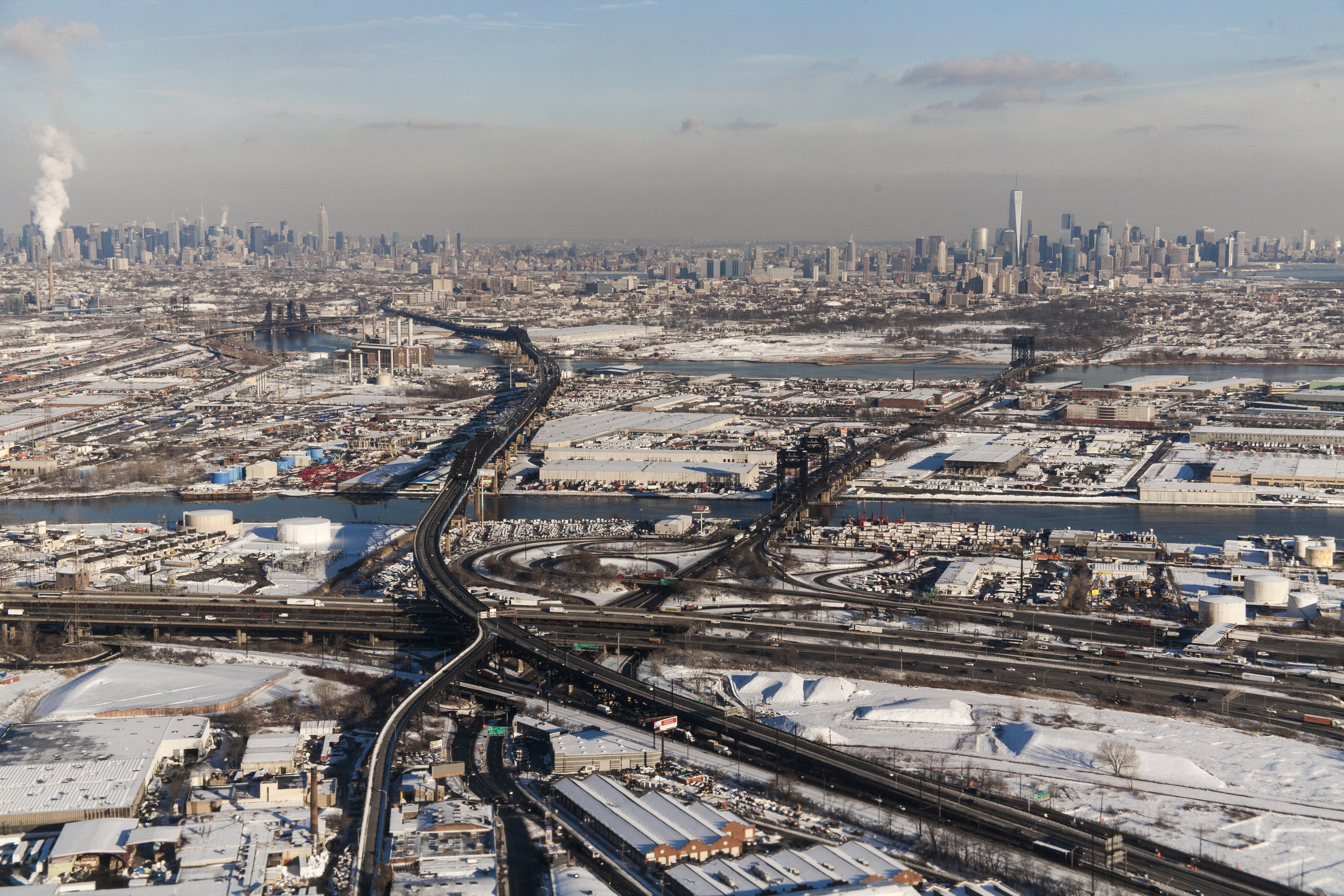
The Pulaski Skyway (left) and the Lincoln Highway cross The Passaic and Hackensack.

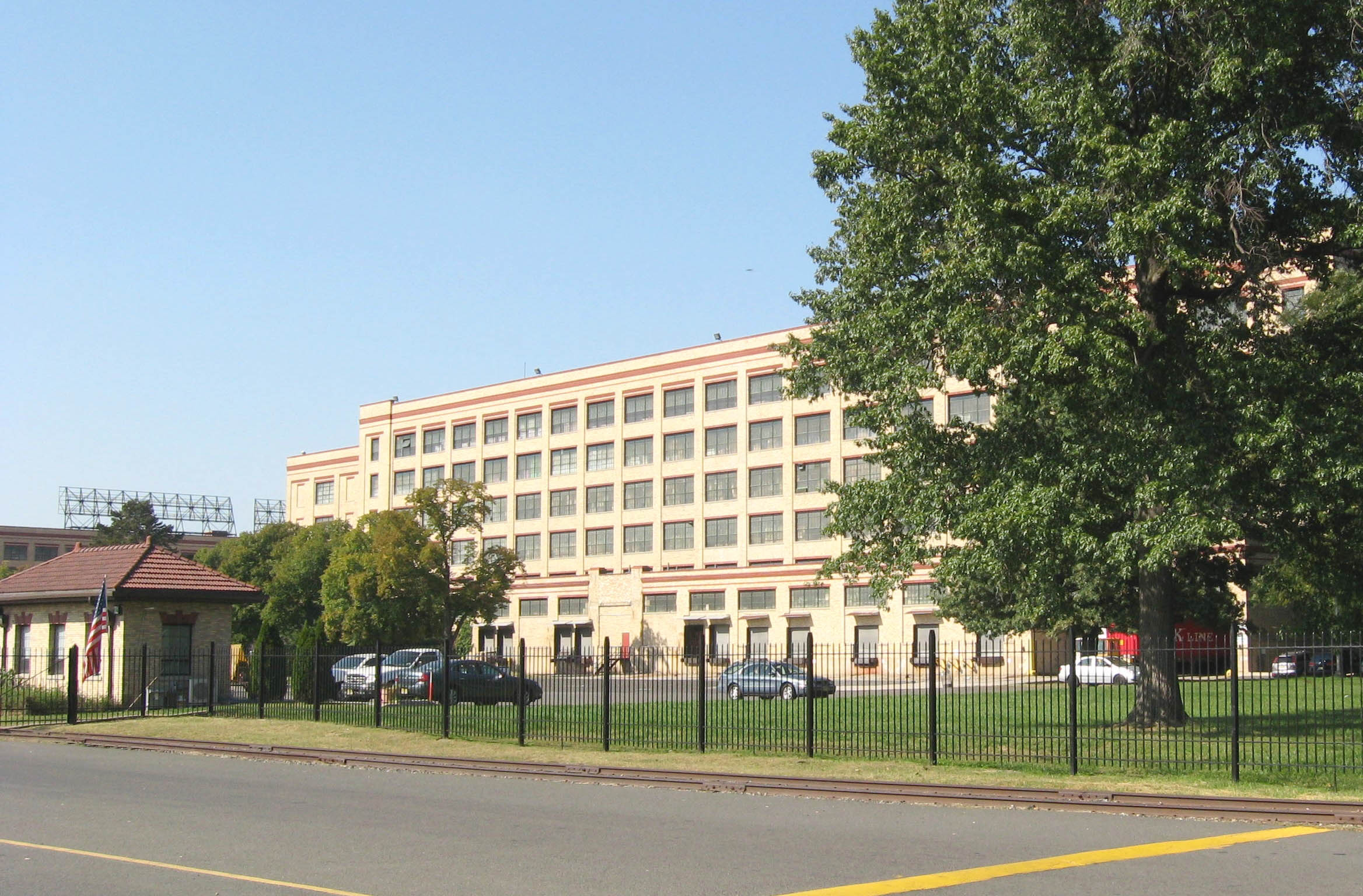
River Terminal includes the former Western Electric Kearny Works.

South Kearny, also known as Kearny Point, is an industrial district and distinct area of the western part of Hudson County, New Jersey at the northern end of Newark Bay in the town of Kearny, New Jersey. It is on the larger peninsula once called New Barbadoes Neck, which also include the other Kearny districts of the Uplands (a part of which is called Arlington) and the Kearny Meadows. It has been known as Kearny Point and, along Droyer's Point in Jersey City, marks the mouth of the Hackensack River to the east. The Passaic River flows along its western border opposite a similarly industrial portion of the Ironbound district of Newark. Most of the point is part of Foreign-Trade Zone 49.

The Newark and New York Railroad Bridge, part of Central Railroad of New Jersey, The Newark Plank Road, and the Morris Canal all crossed the point running parallel to each other. Currently, both the Lincoln Highway and The Pulaski Skyway traverse South Kearny, a ramp of the latter built specifically to spur industrial development. Among the many facilities that are located there are the Hudson County Correctional Facility and River Terminal, a massive distribution warehouse that includes the former site of a Western Electric's Kearny Works manufacturing plant and the Kearny Yard of Federal Shipbuilding and Drydock Company, now also known as Kearny Point.

Since the 2010s the area has been undergoing a transformation from industrial and distribution functions to repurposed spaces. Three film/television studios opened on Kearny Point in the 2000s: Palisades Stages, Mile End Studios and 10 Basin Studios. As of late 2025, Kearny Point's three studios comprise the single largest film and TV stage production location in New Jersey, with more than 220,000 square feet (20,000 m^{2}) of soundstage, set shop and storage, dressing, and pre and post-production spaces.

== Transportation ==
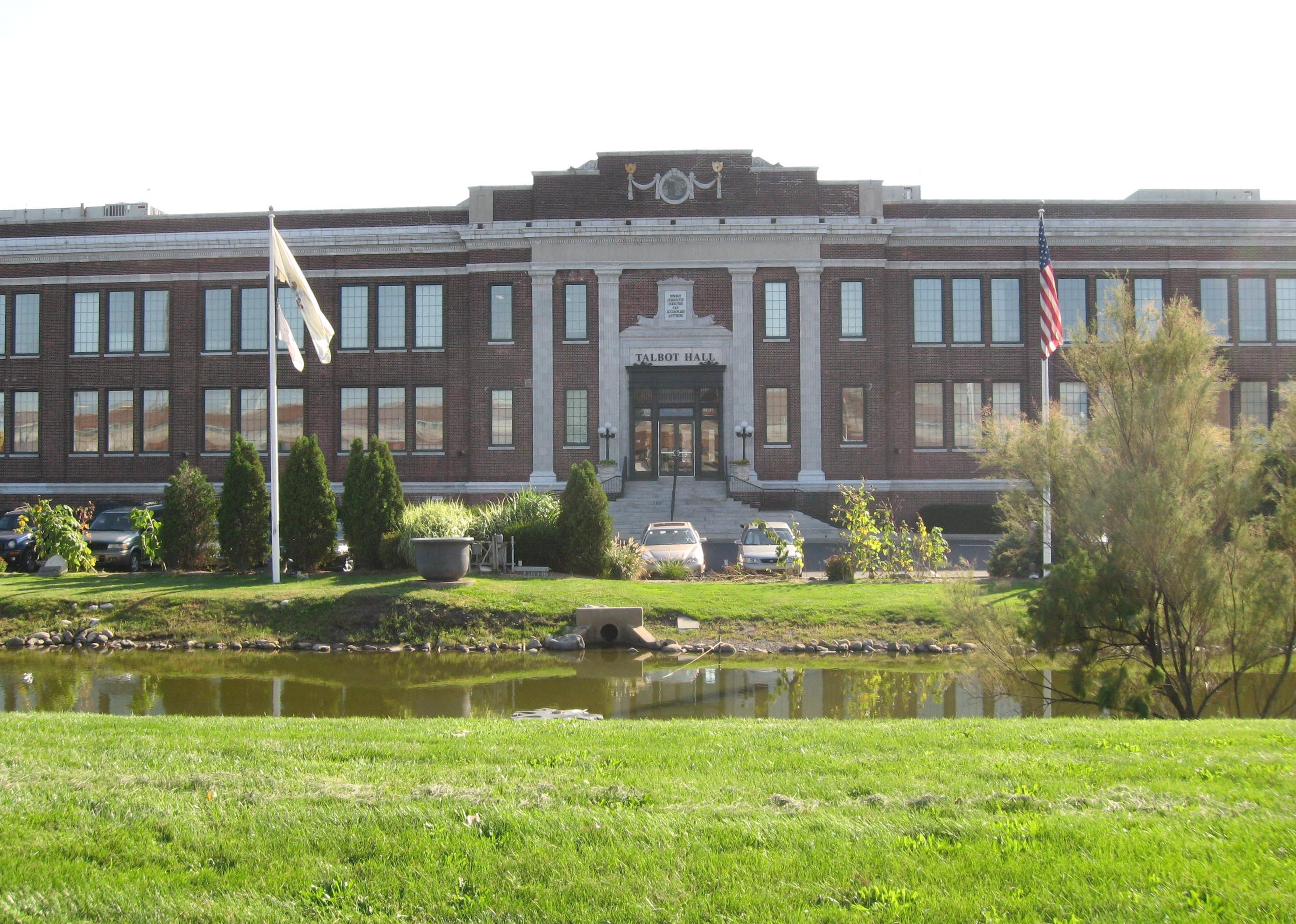
Department of Corrections

Hudson County Route 659 runs along Central Avenue, Pennsylvania Avenue, and Fish House Road. NJ Transit bus route #1 serves the area. Numerous crossings of the Hackensack and Passaic rivers pass through the area.
