= Passaic Street Bridge =

Vehicular bridge in New Jersey, US

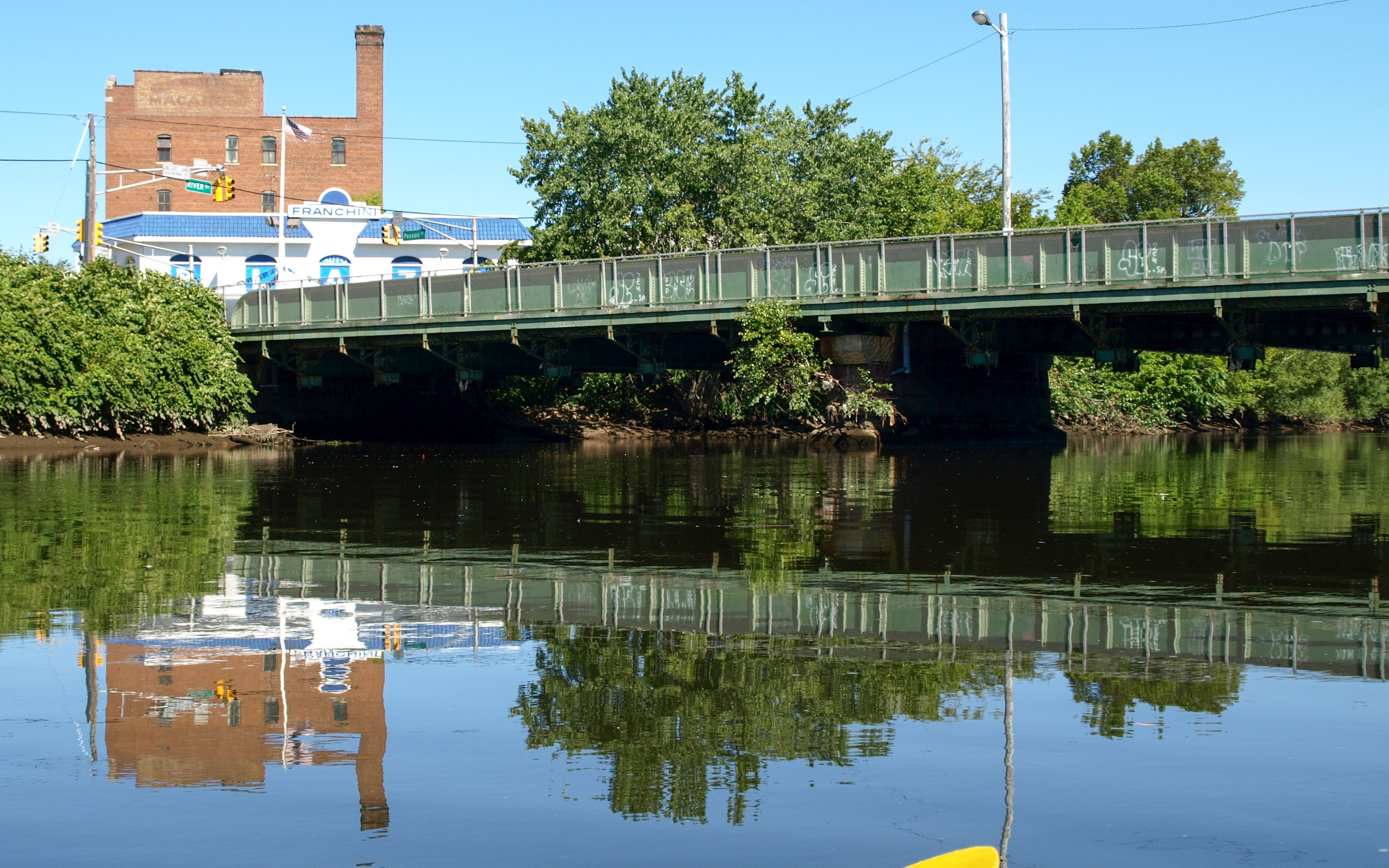
- Coordinates: 40.86478°N 74.10998°W
- Carries: Passaic Street
- Crosses: Passaic River
- Locale: Passaic & Garfield; New Jersey
- Owner: Passaic County and Bergen County
- Maintained by: Passaic and Bergen
- ID number: 020021C

Characteristics
- Design: thru girder
- Material: Steel
- Total length: 233 feet (71 m)
- Width: 27.6 feet (8.4 m)
- Longest span: 78.1 feet (23.8 m)
- No. of spans: 3

History
- Engineering design by: Wise and Watson
- Constructed by: F.R. Long
- Opened: 1898

Location
- Interactive map of Passaic Street Bridge

The Passaic Street Bridge is a vehicular bridge crossing the Passaic River in Passaic and Garfield, New Jersey. The girder bridge was built in 1898 and is the third to span the river at that point. It is considered eligible for listing on the New Jersey Register of Historic Places and National Register of Historic Places.

== See also ==
- List of crossings of the Lower Passaic River
- List of crossings of the Hackensack River
- 1903 New Jersey hurricane
