= Eighth Street Bridge (Passaic River) =

Eight Street Bridge
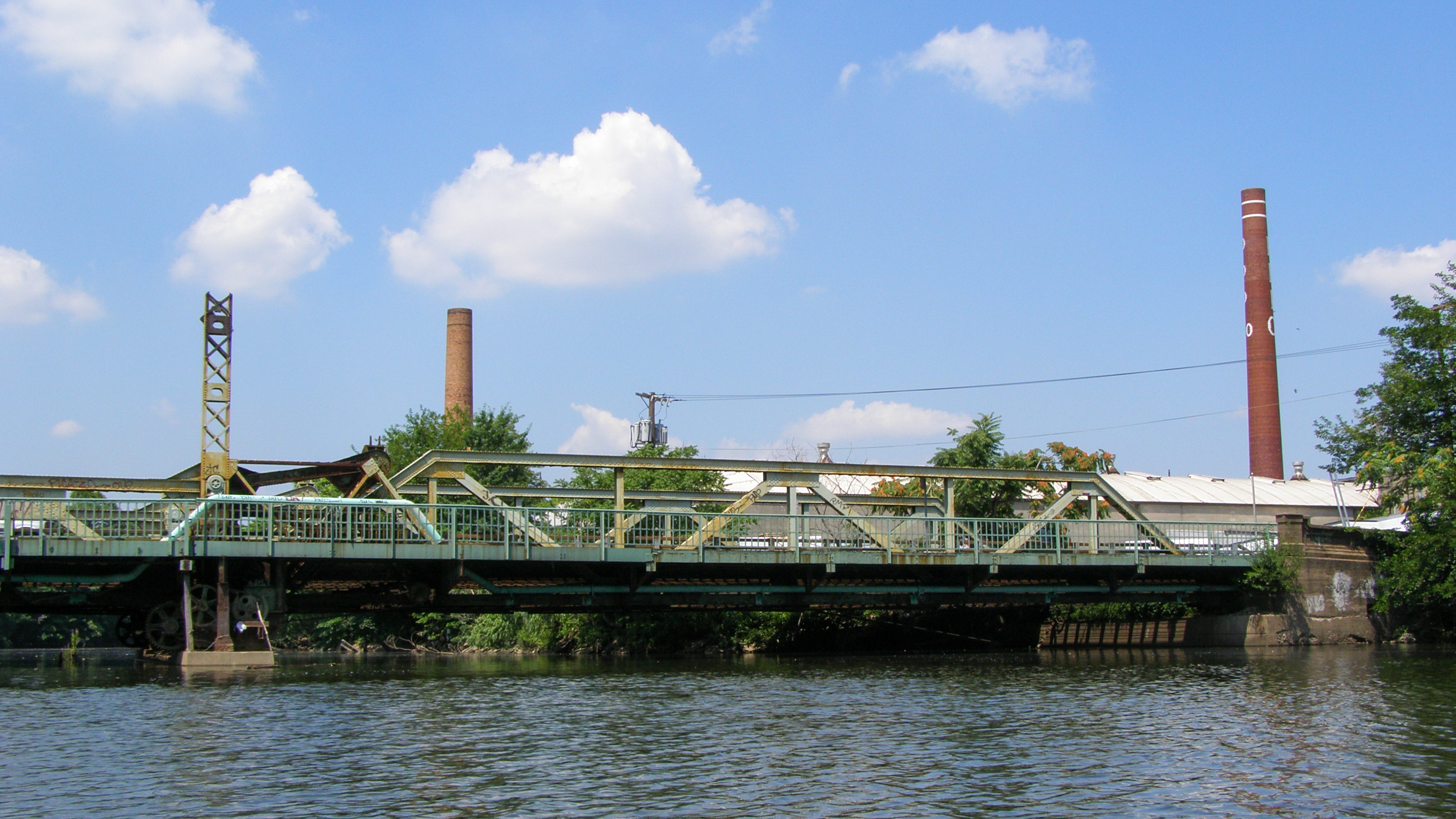
- 1914 bridge replaced in 2017-2019
- Coordinates: 40.8206°N 74.1267°W
- Carries: 8th Street
- Crosses: Passaic River
- Locale: Passaic and Wallington; New Jersey
- Owner: Passaic County and Bergen County
- Maintained by: Passaic and Bergen
- ID number: 1600004
- Preceded by: 1915

Characteristics
- Design: basule pony truss
- Material: Steel
- Total length: 282 feet (86 m)
- Width: 32.2 feet (9.8 m)
- Longest span: 85 feet (26 m)
- No. of spans: 3

History
- Designer: Strauss Bascule Bridge Company
- Constructed by: F.R. Long - W.G. Broadhurst Company (builder)
- Construction start: 1914
- Opened: 2019

Location
- Interactive map of Eight Street Bridge

Eighth Street Bridge is a road bridge over the Passaic River in northeastern New Jersey, United States. It connects the City of Passaic in Passaic County with the Borough of Wallington in Bergen County and is jointly owned by both counties. The bridge connects Eighth Street in Passaic with County Route 507 in Wallington.

Originally opened in 1915 as a bascule bridge, the bridge was fixed in place in 1977. The Eighth Street Bridge was closed to traffic permanently on July 24, 2017 so work could begin on its replacement, which was completed in 2019.

== Location and operations ==
Eighth Street Bridge passes over the Passaic 11.7 miles (18.8 km) from the river mouth at Newark Bay, at the Passaic and Bergen county line.

The lower 17 miles (27 km) of the 90-mile-long (140 km) Passaic River downstream of the Dundee Dam is tidally influenced and channelized. Once one of the most heavily used waterways in the Port of New York and New Jersey, it remains partially navigable for commercial marine traffic.

The original bridge had been in fixed closed position in 1977. Only bridge at MP 11.7 and those downstream from it are required by federal regulations to open.

== Design and construction of first bridge ==
Built in 1914, the Eight Street Bridge was a Warren pony truss bridge, originally a bascule bridge. The total length 282 feet (86 m) with a deck width was 32.2 feet (9.8 m). The length of largest span: 85 feet (26 m) It followed the design of Strauss Bascule Bridge Company of Chicago and was fabricated by the F.R. Long - W.G. Broadhurst Company of Hackensack. The main span was an 85 feet (26 m) long is a Strauss articulated overhead counterweight single leaf bascule span. The entire bridge is supported on a concrete substructure. It originally was composed of built-up members as were the trunnion columns, braced counterweight tower, and counterweight linkages that permitted the counterweight to pivot and move parallel to itself during operation of the bridge.

The bridge was significantly rehabilitated 1965, when a steel grid deck was installed. Between 1976 and 1979 the bridgeman's shanty was demolished and operating controls for the electric-motor powered span were removed and the bridge was fixed in the closed position. The gear sets and shafts were left in place as was the chain-operated manual operation. The original metal sidewalk railings are intact. The 300-ton counterweight, used to open the bridge, began to crumble onto passing cars and had to be removed.

The bridge carried a two-lane road, two sidewalks, and a utility pipe from 8th Street in Passaic to Main Avenue in Wallington. As of 2014, was used by about 6,500 vehicles per day.

The State Historic Preservation Office determined in that Eighth Street Bridge was of historical and engineering merit to be included in the state (ID#3426) and federal register of historic places.

== Replacement ==
The 1914 bridge had seriously deteriorated and as of 2015 was in a state of severe disrepair and considered to be structurally deficient and fracture critical. There were 13 ton, 19 ton and 30 ton weight restrictions. Plans to replace the bridge had been in place since 2012. Funding was provided by state and federal sources. Land acquisition of parcels in the vicinity of the bridge has been mired in legal eminent domain battles have hampered replacement.

After delays of several months, the bridge was closed to traffic on July 24, 2017.

The new 290-foot (88 m) Eighth Street Bridge with two lanes of traffic in each direction was completed in August 2019 with the assistance of $15 million in aid from the federal government

== See also ==
- List of crossings of the Lower Passaic River
- Botany Worsted Mills Historic District
