= Monroe Street Bridge (Passaic River) =

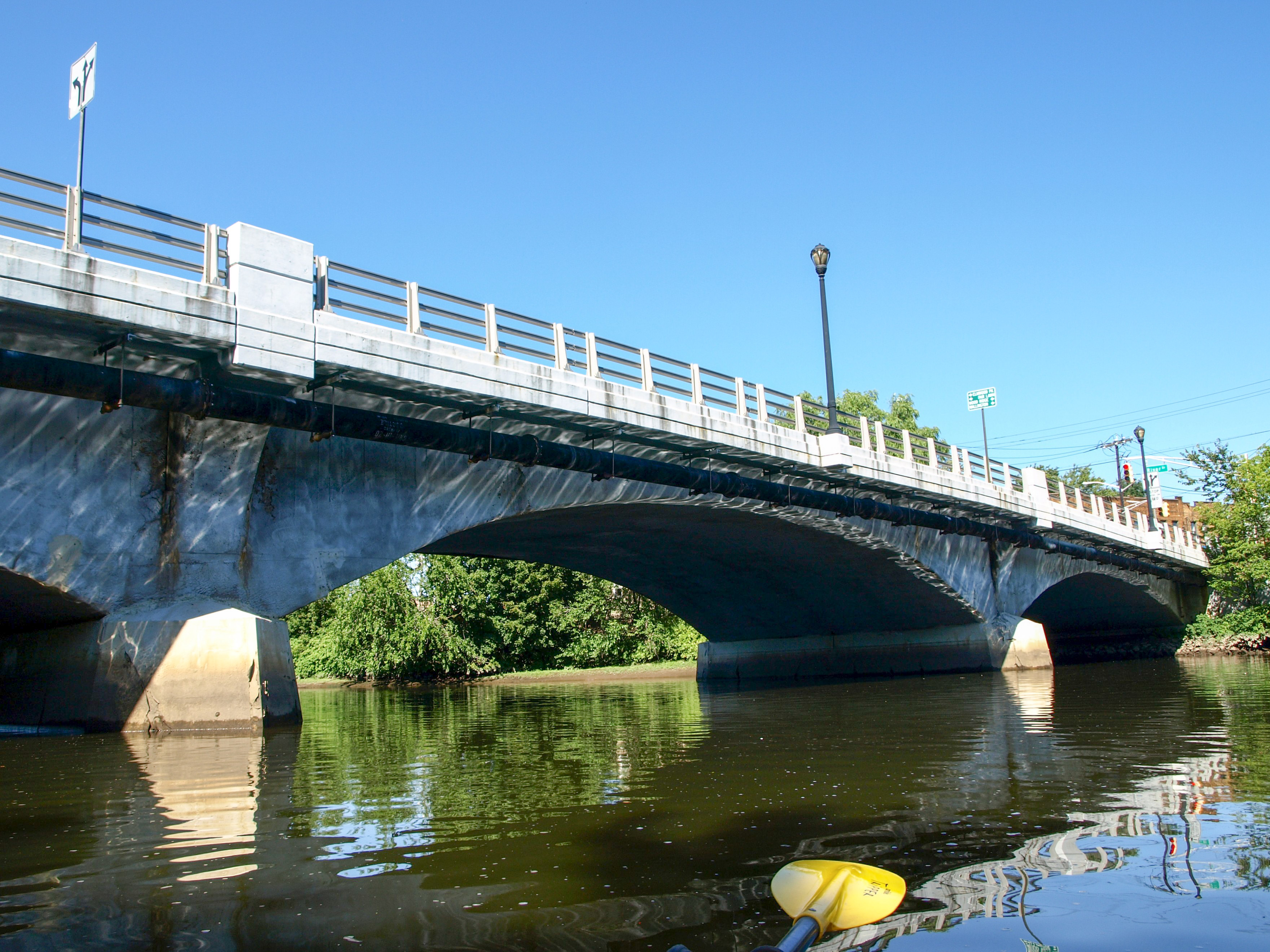
- Coordinates: 40.86883°N 74.11249°W
- Carries: Monroe Street
- Crosses: Passaic River
- Locale: Passaic & Garfield; New Jersey
- Owner: Passaic County and Bergen County
- Maintained by: Passaic and Bergen
- ID number: 02000I6; 020021D

Characteristics
- Design: deck arch
- Material: Reinforced concrete
- Total length: 306 feet (93 m)
- Width: 30.2 feet (9.2 m)
- Longest span: 87.9 feet (26.8 m)
- No. of spans: 3

History
- Engineering design by: F.R. Long Company
- Constructed by: C.W. Dean and Company
- Opened: 1908

Monroe Street Bridge is bridge over the Passaic River in Passaic and Garfield, New Jersey. The 3-span reinforced concrete elliptical deck arch bridge was built in 1908. It was designed by Colin Wise and built by C.W. Dean and Company. It is 306 feet long and 30.2 feet wide.

== See also ==
- List of crossings of the Lower Passaic River
