= Botany Mills =

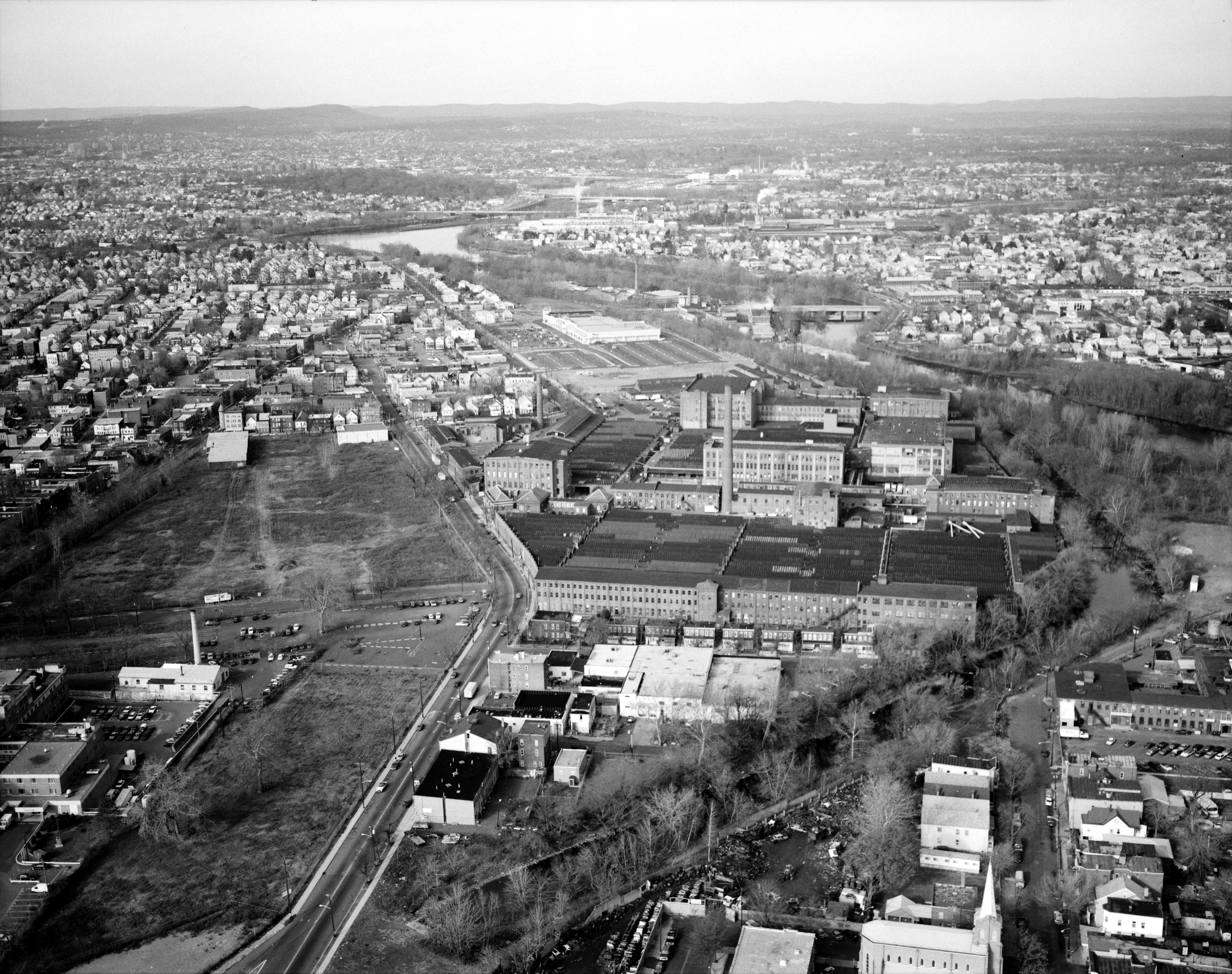
Botany Worsted Mills (center) in a 1997 photo. The mills are part of the Dundee Canal Industrial Historic District.

Botany Mills was a Passaic, New Jersey, manufacturer of textiles, which was organized in 1887. It merged with Continental Textile Co., Ltd., in January 1927. Botany Mills continued to have a controlling interest in both Botany Worsted Mills and Garfield Worsted Mills. The company was a key target of the 1926 Passaic Textile Strike, which lasted almost a year. The business is significant for having survived the Great Depression while continuing to be a leader in its field in the decades afterward.

== Corporation history ==
Botany Mills' stock listed on the New York Stock Exchange reached a low for 1929 in late September, a month prior to the 1929 Stock Market Crash. The company's net loss of $2,768,904 for 1929, exceeded the 1928 deficit which totaled $1,461,783.

In June 1932 Botany Mills formed an independent bondholders protective committee which called for immediate deposits of bonds. The firm had descended into receivership after defaulting on the payment of interest on its bonds on April 1, 1932. The Empire Trust Company served as depositary for the committee.

In October 1948 Botany Mills announced that it would absorb higher raw material and labor costs without raising prices on goods. They maintained prices on wool shirts and pants as well as on their swimming trunk line. However their gabardine boxer shorts increased in price from $6.95 to $7.50 retail.

In August 1954, Daroff and Sons, a Philadelphia clothing manufacturer which had produced worsteds for Botany under contract for several years, purchased a controlling interest in Botany Mills.

In late 1955, Botany left the textile business and transferred its Passaic plant to an affiliate company, Clarence Worsted. Botany transitioned into real estate, product licensing and cosmetics.
