= Kearny Uplands =

Populated place in Hudson County, New Jersey, US

Coordinates: 40.77560°N 74.14964°W

The Uplands district of Kearny, New Jersey is the residential area in the northwestern portion of town, on a ridge between the Kearny Meadows and the Passaic River, along which runs Riverbank Park. Arlington is located within the Kearny Uplands.

== See also ==
- WR Draw
