= West Hudson, New Jersey =

Populated place in Hudson County, New Jersey, US

Coordinates: 40.7597°N 74.1454°W

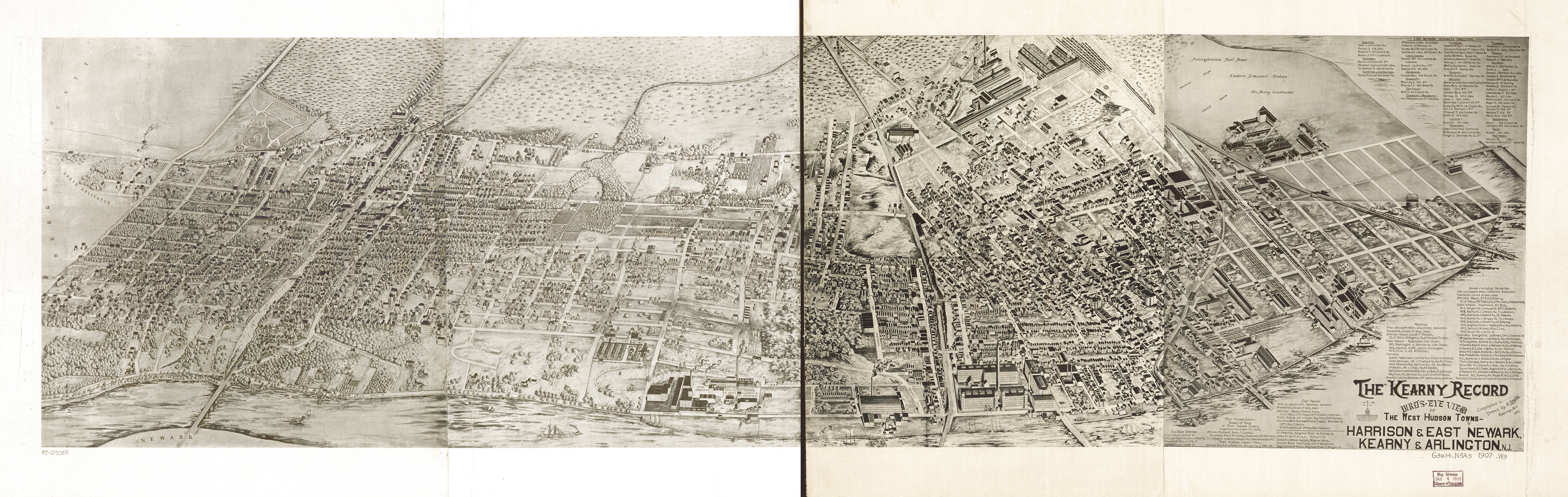
Bird's-eye view of the West Hudson towns Harrison, East Newark, Kearny & Arlington (1907)

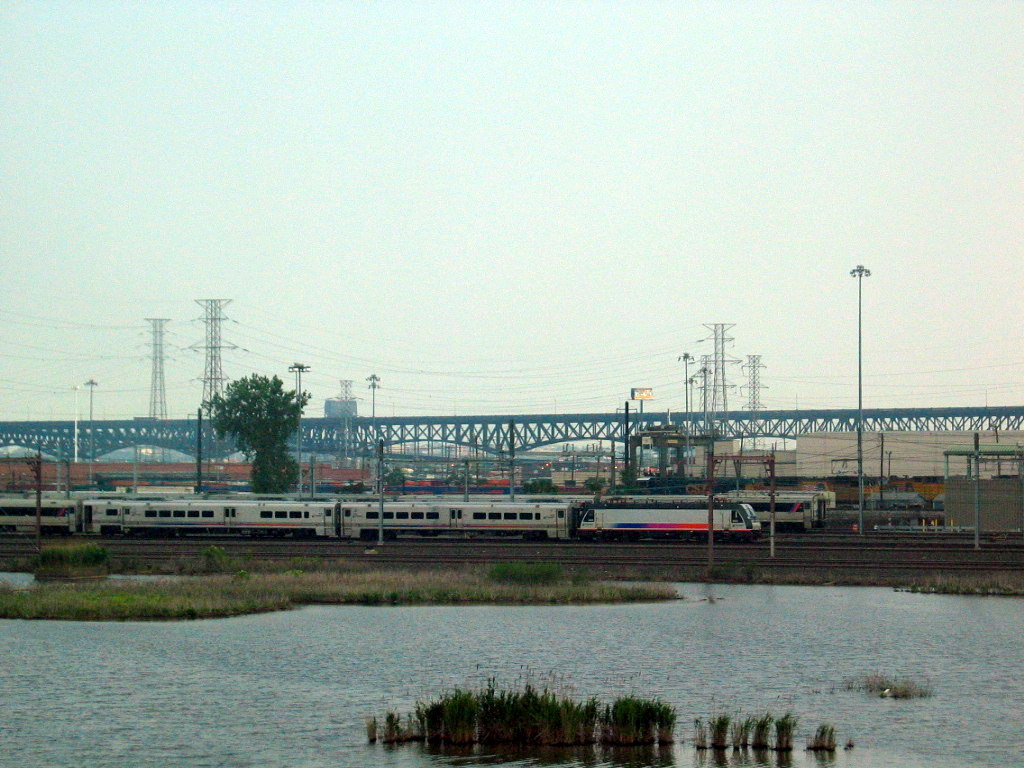
The Kearny Meadows are crisscrossed with rail infrastructure and is home to New Jersey Transit's Meadows Maintenance Complex

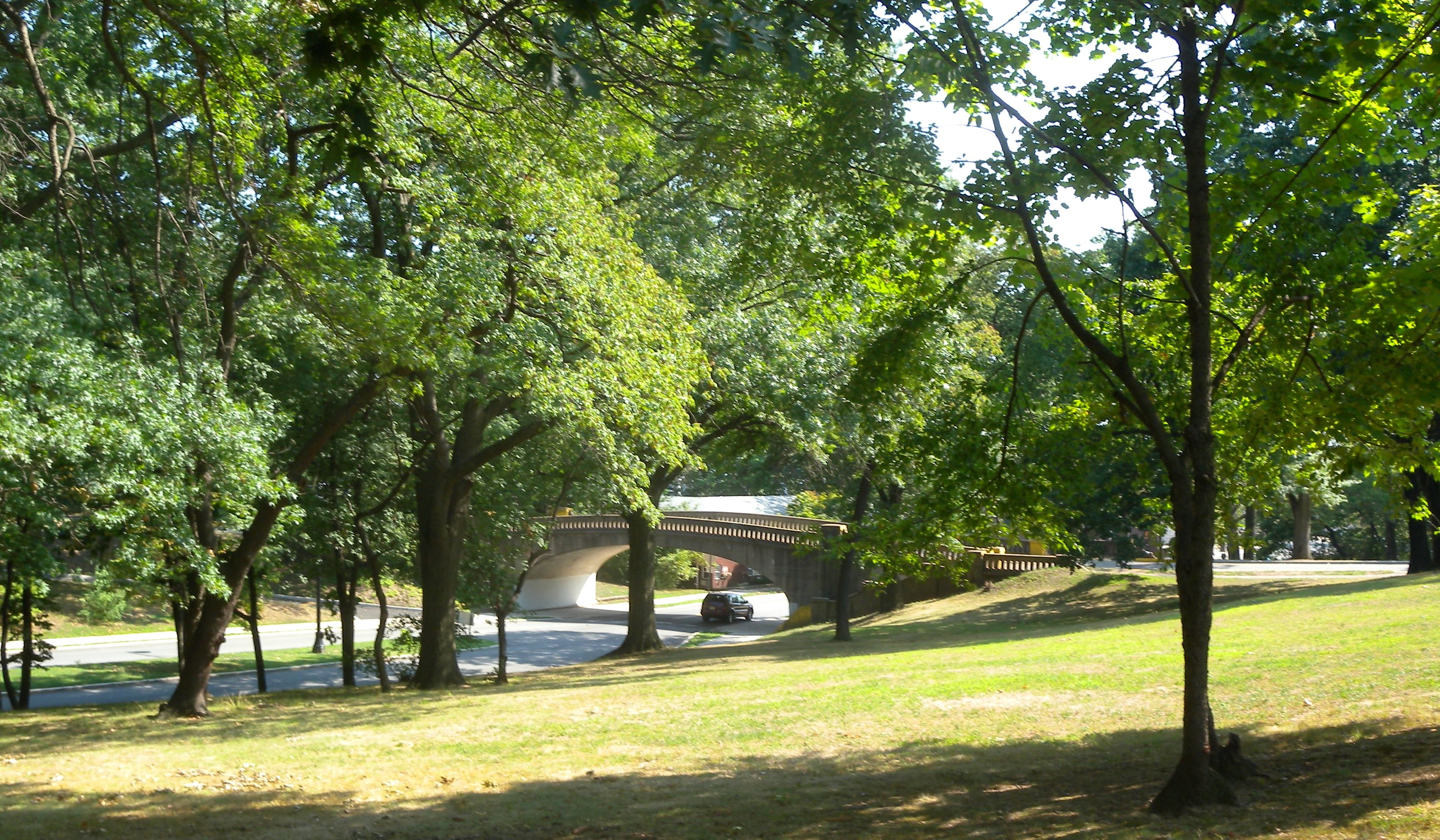
West Hudson Park in Kearny and Harrison

West Hudson is the western part of Hudson County, New Jersey comprising the contiguous municipalities of Kearny, Harrison and East Newark, which lies on the peninsula between the Hackensack River and Passaic River.

The Passaic River separates it from Newark and Belleville, and the Hackensack River separates it from Jersey City, the county seat, and Secaucus. Residential and commercial districts, including Arlington, are concentrated along the banks of the Passaic, also site of Kearny Riverbank Park. At Kearny Point there is more industry. Brownfields or protected areas known as the Kearny Meadows or the Kearny Marsh are part of the New Jersey Meadowlands. West Hudson Park is the county park in the area. Arlington Memorial Park cemetery is located on Schuyler Avenue.

The area was known as Meghgectecock (spellings include masgichteu-cunk) by the Hackensack tribe of Lenape people who lived there at the time of European colonization, meaning where May-apples grow, from a moist-woodland perennial that bears edible yellow berries and used to describe the lobe of land between and before the confluence of the Hackensack and Passaic at Newark Bay. During the 17th century was part of the area called Achter Col by New Netherlanders in the province of New Netherland. It was later given the name New Barbadoes Neck by British colonialists. All of West Hudson was originally part of Essex County under the jurisdiction of Newark. In 1710 it was made part of New Barbadoes Township, and part of Bergen County. The West Hudson municipalities were part of Harrison Township, which was created by an act of the New Jersey Legislature on April 13, 1840, and was part of Hudson County, which had been created from portions of Bergen County on February 22, 1840. The current borders were created through a series of secessions and reincorporations.

The West Hudson towns and Newark, particularly the Ironbound across the Passaic, have been called the "Cradle of American Soccer" having a long history and tradition with the game. On November 28, 1885, Kearny hosted the first international soccer match held outside of the United Kingdom between the United States and Canada at Clark Field in the neighborhood that is now East Newark. Kearny's nickname, "Soccer Town, USA" comes from tradition that originated in the mid-1870s after Scottish and Irish immigration. The Newark Portuguese, Clark A.A., Clark O.N.T. Harrison S.C., Kearny Scots and West Hudson A.A. were among the many teams that called the area home. Harrison hosts Sports Illustrated Stadium, the home of the New York Red Bulls of Major League Soccer and Gotham FC of the National Women's Soccer League, with local soccer culture being centered around the famed Harrison Soccer Courts. Harrison Park was located a few blocks northwest of the site of Sports Illustrated Stadium and was the home field of West Hudson A.A. It hosted the American Cup final in 1920 and 1921 and U.S. Open Cup final in 1918 and 1923.

Portion of the Morris Canal ran through Kearny Point, unused portions which remain today. The peninsula is crisscrossed with rail passenger and freight rail lines, including those of Amtrak, New Jersey Transit, and PATH, the last of which maintains a station at Harrison (Amtrak and NJT having ceased service there). Also in this area was the former Manhattan Transfer. The Kearny Connection and Waterfront Connection are major passenger rail junctions. The proposed high-speed rail line known as the Gateway Project will traverse the area and includes the replacement of the Portal Bridge and the Sawtooth Bridges.

West Hudson's Saint Patrick's Day Parade passes through the three municipalities.

Since the creation of the 29th Legislative District in the 1970s, the three communities have always been represented in the same district.

== See also ==
- List of bridges, tunnels, and cuts in Hudson County, New Jersey
- Belleville Turnpike
- Gateway Region
- County Route 507 (New Jersey)
- County Route 508 (New Jersey)
- Kearny Connection
- Riverbend (Hudson County)
- North Hudson
- New Jersey Meadowlands
- North Jersey Shared Assets Area
- Pulaski Skyway
