= Dundee Canal =

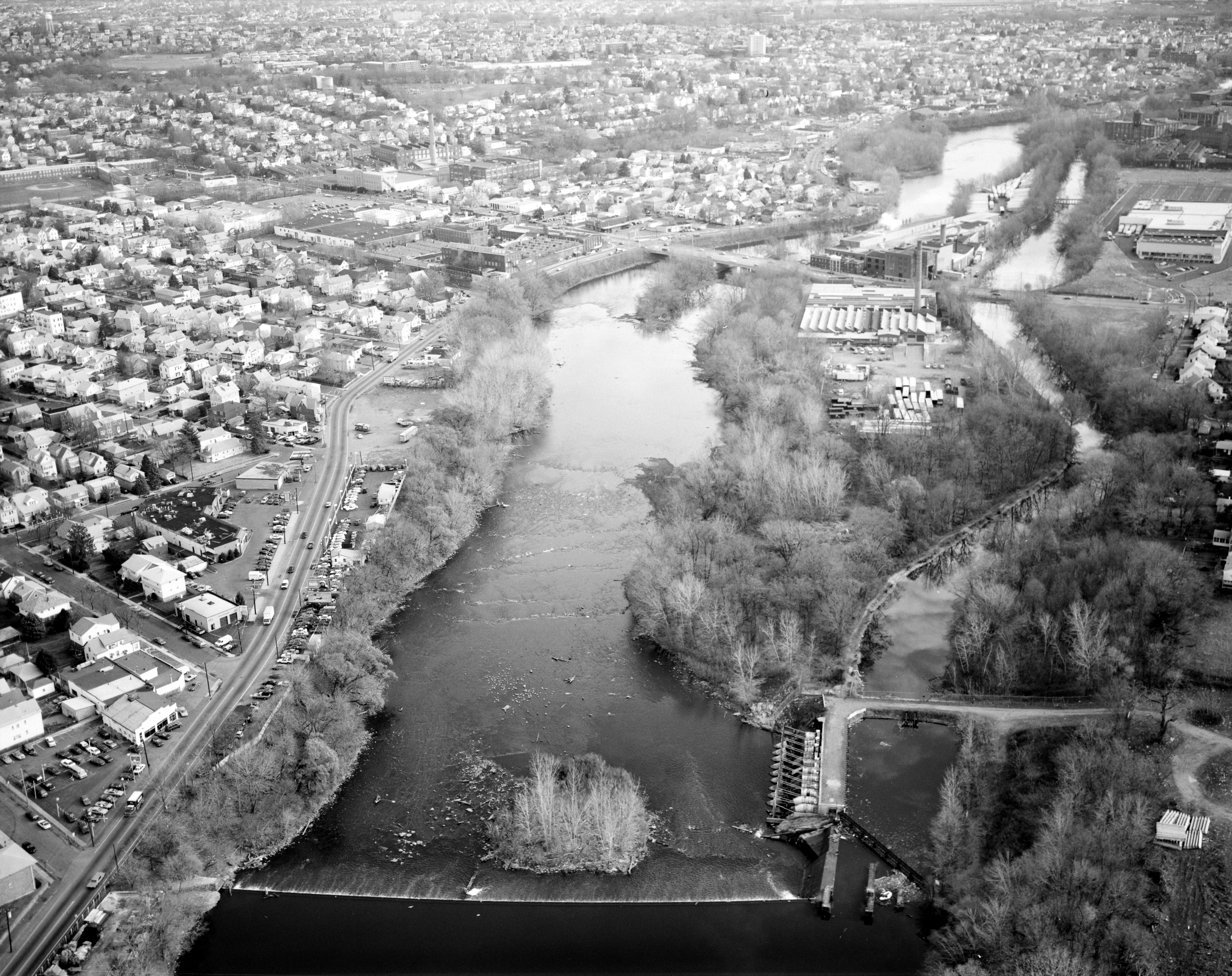
- Dundee Canal (right) in 1997, with Passaic River in the center. Looking southeast, with Garfield on the left bank of the river and Passaic on the right. The Dundee Dam with headgate for the canal is in the foreground, and the former Dundee Textile Mill is seen between the river and canal.
- Interactive map of Dundee Canal

Specifications
- Length: 1.8 mi (2.9 km)
- Status: Abandoned

History
- Original owner: Dundee Manufacturing Company
- Construction began: 1858
- Date of first use: July 1861
- Date completed: 1861
- Date closed: c. 1930s

Geography
- Start point: Clifton, New Jersey
- End point: Passaic, New Jersey
- Beginning coordinates: 40.8825°N 74.127°W
- Ending coordinates: 40.873°N 74.1167°W
- Connects to: Passaic River

The Dundee Canal was an industrial canal in Clifton and Passaic in Passaic County, New Jersey. It was built between 1858 and 1861 and ran parallel to the Passaic River. It supplied hydropower and water for manufacturing. There was interest by some members of the business community to modify the canal to support navigational uses, but the canal was never used for that purpose.

The Dundee Canal, along with the advent of railroads, stimulated rapid economic and population growth in Passaic and the surrounding area through the late 19th and early 20th century.

== Description ==
The canal was about 1.8 miles (2.9 km) long. The Dundee Dam across the Passaic River was located at the north end of the canal, between Acquackanonk Township (present-day Clifton) and East Passaic (present-day Garfield), and it provided water for the canal. The dam was the lowest hydropower site built on the river, just above the tidal zone.

== History ==
=== Founding and 19th century operations ===
The Dundee Manufacturing Company (DMC), incorporated 1832, built the Dundee Dam across the Passaic River c. 1833, replacing an earlier wing dam it had built c. 1830. The dam was designed to supply water power to clothing mills in the area. The company also built a 12 feet (3.7 m) deep, 0.5 miles (0.80 km) long canal c. 1833, adjacent to the site of the later Dundee Canal. It operated the short canal for a few years.

In 1857 the New Jersey Legislature authorized the company to raise the water level of the dam, and this action flooded adjacent areas and created Dundee Lake. The flooding of various properties led to calls by area manufacturers and other community members to make the canal into a navigable waterway. This would have been an unusual combination of uses for a single canal.

The DMC, which had reorganized in 1850, built the Dundee Canal between 1858 and 1861. This canal was not financially successful for navigation, and the company went into receivership in 1864. It reorganized as the Dundee Water Power and Land Company (DWPLC) in 1872, and the company's new emphasis on supplying water and selling land was more lucrative.

The Dundee Canal's reliable water supply (both for power and manufacturing processes), and the availability of railroad service in the area (from branch lines that became part of the Erie Railroad) attracted manufacturing businesses to Passaic for the next several decades. The population in Passaic doubled between 1860 and 1880 (to 6,500). Several large textile mills were founded, including the Botany Worsted Mills, established in 1889. By 1900 the city population was 25,000.

With increased urban development in the late 19th century, the canal water became dirtier and therefore less usable by the adjoining textile mills, but the water source was still useful for other industries, such as rubber and paper manufacturing, as well as for fire protection.

=== 20th century ===
Industrial use of the canal declined significantly during the Great Depression, and woolen manufacturing also declined. The canal continued to accumulate a large quantity of trash, and in the late 1930s the City of Passaic leased a portion of the canal, installed a culvert and paved it over, for parking lots and other public uses. After World War II ownership of the canal changed several times. A group of investors bought the DWPLC in 1946, and the company was sold to the Hackensack Water Company in 1974. Much of the remainder of the canal was destroyed starting in 1997, as the moribund waterway was used to extend the New Jersey Route 21 freeway and replace the old surface route over city streets. The canal bed was filled and used as a foundation for the highway from approximately its headwaters to Dayton Avenue.

=== Dundee Canal Industrial Historic District ===
- Dundee Canal
- U.S. National Register of Historic Places
- U.S. Historic district
- New Jersey Register of Historic Places
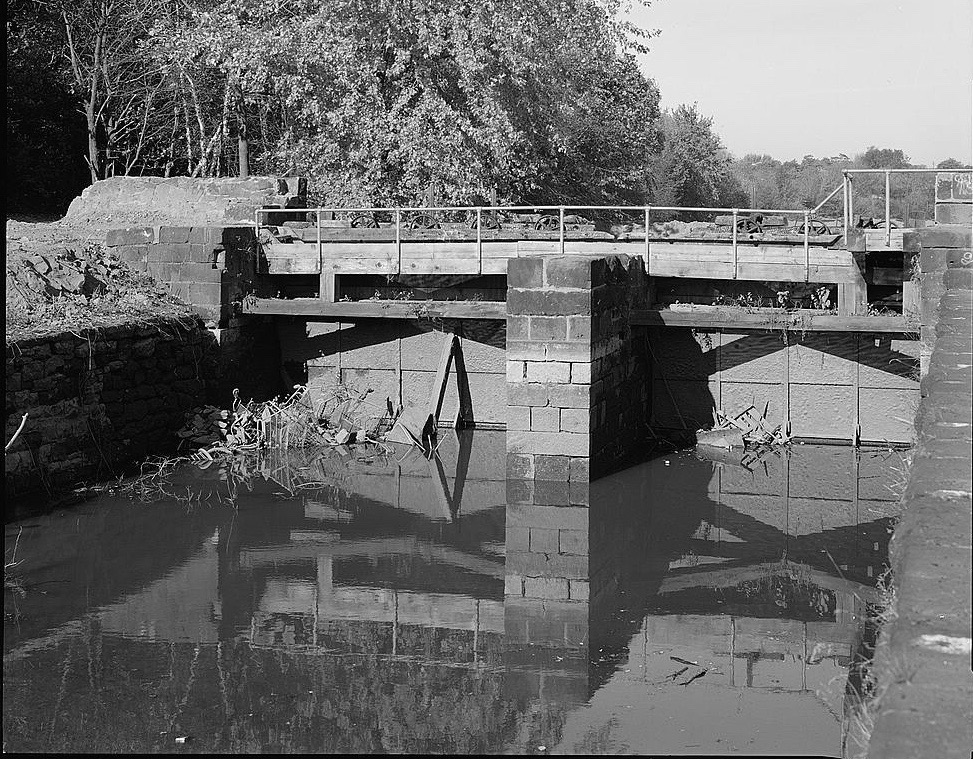

- Location within Passaic County, New Jersey Location within New Jersey Location within the United States
- Nearest city: Passaic, New Jersey
- Coordinates: 40°52′25″N 74°7′12″W
- Area: 66 acres (27 ha)
- Built: 1858
- Architect: Kick, Ludwig; et al.
- Architectural style: Colonial Revival, Functional industrial
- NRHP reference No.: 98001640
- NJRHP No.: 2351

Significant dates
- Added to NRHP: January 21, 1999
- Designated NJRHP: November 5, 1998

The Dundee Canal Industrial Historic District was added to the National Register of Historic Places on January 21, 1999. The district comprises the canal and several former textile mills, including the Botany Worsted Mills; the Acquackanonk Water Company Site; and related structures.

== See also ==
- Society for Establishing Useful Manufactures (Paterson-based early investor in Dundee Canal)
- List of canals in the United States
- List of crossings of the Lower Passaic River
