= Passaic River Bridge =

Passaic River Bridge may refer to:

- Lincoln Highway Passaic River Bridge
- Route 46 Passaic River Bridge

or any of a number of bridges included in:

- List of crossings of the Lower Passaic River
- List of crossings of the Upper Passaic River
