= List of crossings of the Upper Passaic River =

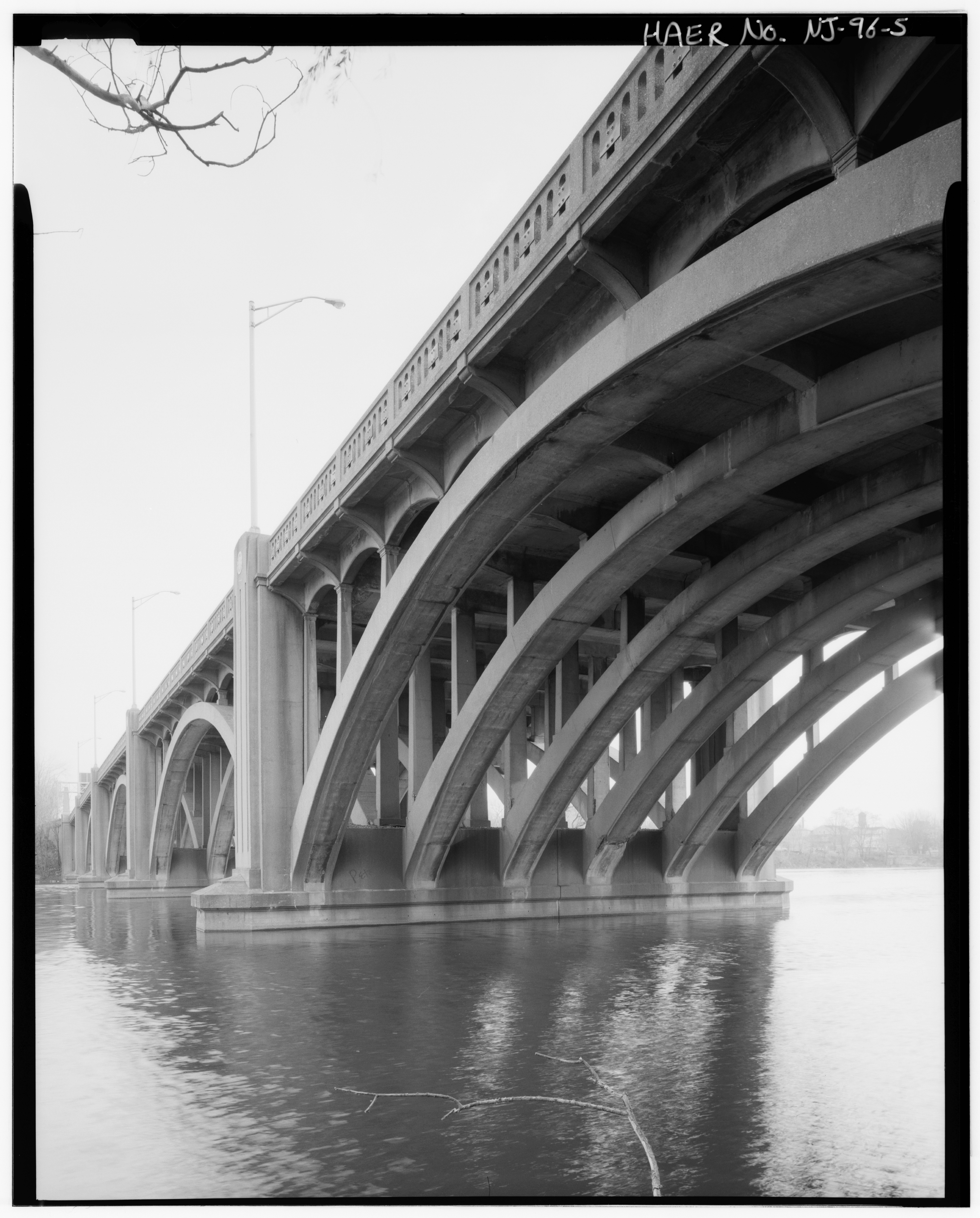
Passaic River Bridge

The Upper Passaic River in New Jersey is the section of the Passaic River above the Dundee Dam, including the Great Falls. The entire river flows for 81 miles from its river's source in Mendham to the river mouth at Newark Bay in the northeastern part of the state. The Passaic traverses 45 municipalities, and its watershed provides drinking water for more than 3.5 million people in the region. The midpoint of the upper river generally delineates the Passaic-Bergen, Passaic-Essex, Essex-Morris, Morris-Union and sections of the Morris-Somerset county lines.

There are over 110 crossings along the lower and upper river including vehicular and rail bridges. The upper reaches are also crossed by footbridges, dams, culverts, and a pre-colonial weir. In the colonial era the first bridge along the lower reaches was at Bridge Street in Newark and the first over the upper river was Totowa Bridge, constructed before 1737. The creation of Society for Establishing Useful Manufactures in 1791 began a period of development of cities and industries along the river. The emergence of the early railroads in the state led to further industrialization and urbanization and many rail bridges. The flood of 1903 caused damage or destruction of most bridges in the vicinity of Paterson. The advent of the automobile age and suburbanization in the early and mid-20th century saw the construction of highway bridges in northern New Jersey.

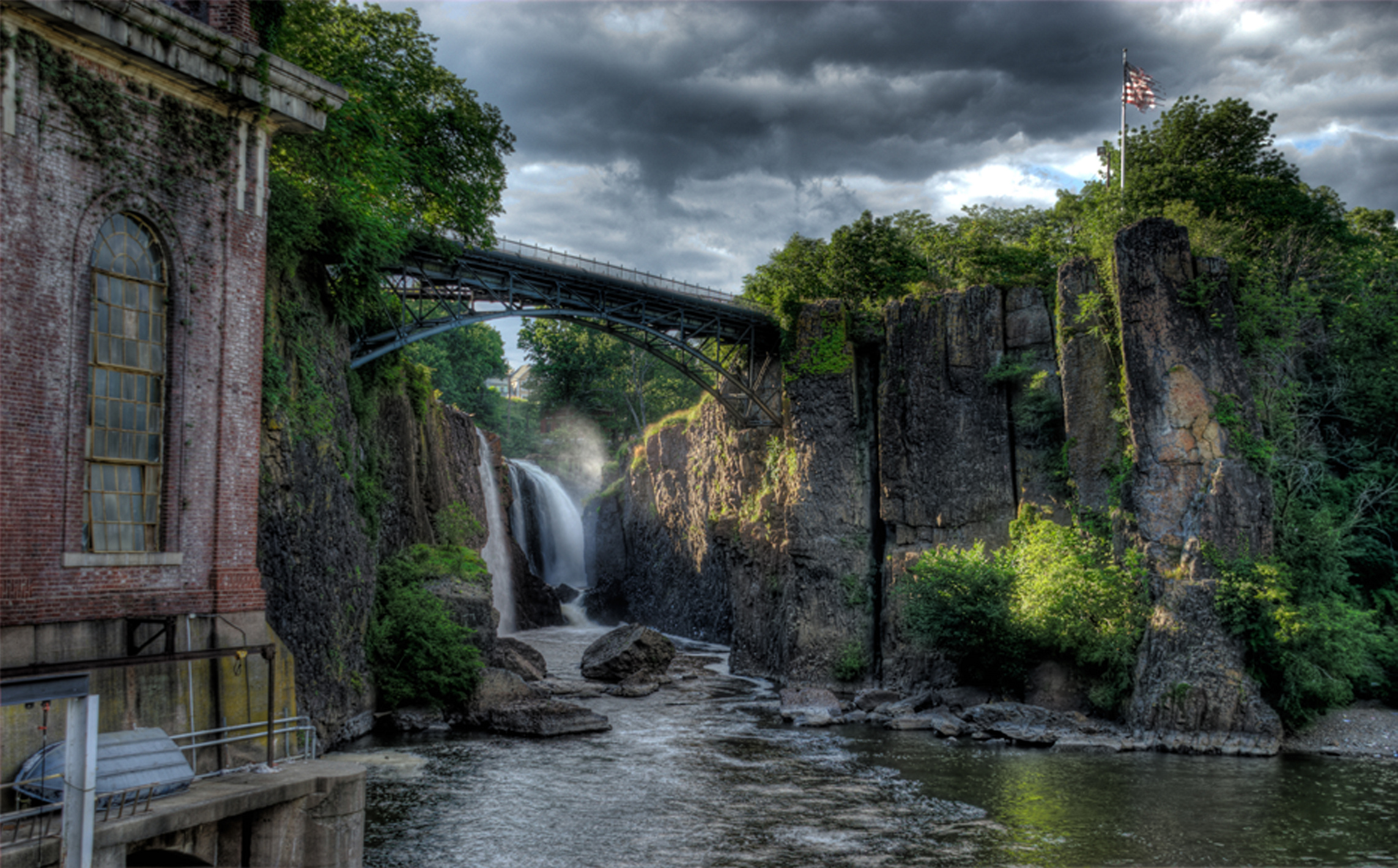
At the Great Falls

Existing crossings of the Lower Passaic are PD Draw, Lincoln Highway Passaic River Bridge, Pulaski Skyway, Point-No-Point Bridge, Chaplain Washington Bridge, Harry Laderman Bridge, Jackson Street Bridge, Dock Bridge, Bridge Street Bridge, Newark Drawbridge, William A. Stickel Memorial Bridge, Clay Street Bridge, NX Bridge, WR Draw, Belleville Turnpike Bridge, Avondale Bridge, Lyndhurst Draw, Route 3 Passaic River Crossing, Union Avenue Bridge, Gregory Avenue Bridge, Market Street Bridge, Eighth Street Bridge, Passaic Street Bridge, Monroe Street Bridge and Veterans Bridge.

Power transmission lines pass over the river several times. The Public Service Electric and Gas Company (PSE&G) Northern Inner Ring Transmission Line runs from Metuchen Substation to Athenia Substation in Clifton via Roseland Substation and also includes right of way from Roseland Substation to West Orange Substation. The Pennsylvania-New Jersey Interconnection (PJM Interconnection) Bushkill to Roseland Transmission Line extends from Roseland to Hardwick Township in Warren County. Jersey Central Power and Light also has lines across the river.

== Crossings ==
Crossing	Image	Dates	Type	Carries/Carried	Locale/Municipality	Coordinates	NBI/FRA code	Notes	References
Dundee Dam		1861	dam		Clifton - Garfield	40°53′01″N 74°07′36″W		NJRHP #22327 (SHPO)	
Garden State Parkway				Garden State Parkway milepoint 158.28	Clifton - Elmwood Park	40°53′23″N 74°07′47″W	361582T	NJTA	
Passaic River Bridge aka Crooks Avenue Bridge site of Weasel Bridge		c.1937 1995 rebuild	open spandrel (false concrete arch;true steel girder)	U.S. Route 46 milepoint 63.95	Clifton- Paterson - Elmwood Park	40°53′38″N 74°07′44″W	1607168	Morris Goodkind; NJDOT; Cedar Lawn Cemetery; NJRHP #2330 (SHPO) (breakout)	
Route 46		1955	culvert	U.S. Route 46 milepoint 64.52	Elmwood Park	40°53′36″N 74°07′07″W	0220152	over branch of the Passaic	
Christopher Columbus Highway		1964; 1969		Interstate 80 milepoint 60.47	Paterson - Elmwood Park	40°54′07″N 74°08′00″W	1610152	NJDOT	
Market Street Bridge		1903 lost flood 1923; 2005 replace		Market Street; CR 448; CR 56	Paterson - Elmwood Park	40°54′09″N 74°08′00″W	020011C		
NYS&W milepost 18.00		c.1937	rail	New York, Susquehanna and Western Railway	Paterson - Elmwood Park	40°54′15″N 74°07′57″W	6150???	NJ Midland; Passaic–Bergen Rail Line	
Broadway Bridge	1903 Bridge 1988 Bridge	1903 lost flood 1931; 1988 rebuilt	arch	NJ Route 4 milepoint 0.17; Broadway; Public Service	Paterson - Elmwood Park	40°55′06″N 74°07′49″W	0205150	NJDOT; North Jersey Rapid Transit	
Morlot Avenue Bridge		1890 lost flood 1904 new 1976 rehab 2009 replace	open truss	Morlot Avenue; 33rd Street; CR 651	Paterson - Fair Lawn	40°55′27″N 74°08′25″W	020017E		
Fair Lawn Avenue Bridge aka Fifth Avenue Bridge		1905; 1967 rehab 2018 replace (planned)	through truss bridge	Fair Lawn Avenue; Fifth Avenue	Paterson - Fair Lawn	40°56′02″N 74°08′23″W	1600009	Scheduled for replacement 2020	
Fair Lawn-Paterson Fish Weir			weir		Paterson - Fair Lawn	40°56′11″N 74°08′26″W		Acquackanonk tribe Slooterdam	
Maple Avenue Bridge replaced Wagaraw Bridge		1907; 1992 rehab		County Route 507	Paterson - Fair Lawn	40°56′26″N 74°08′38″W	1600010		
Lincoln Avenue Bridge replaced Moffat Bridge		1903 lost flood 1926; 1993 rebuilt	stringer	Lincoln Avenue; County Route 504	Paterson - Hawthorne	40°56′30″N 74°08′53″W	1600011		
NYS&W Bridge		1869 original	rail	New York, Susquehanna and Western Railway	Paterson - Hawthorne	40°56′17″N 74°09′14″W	6150???	NJ Midland; Passaic–Bergen Rail Line	
Main Line milepost 17.34		1848 original	rail Pratt through truss	NJT Main Line; EL; Erie Main Line; Newark Branch.	Paterson - Hawthorne	40°56′14″N 74°09′26″W	4003???	NJRHP #252 (SHPO)	
Sixth Avenue Bridge		c.1900 1987 rehab	pony truss	North Sixth Street; CR 652	Paterson - Prospect Park	40°56′03″N 74°10′00″W	1600012		
Hillman Street Bridge		1902 lost to flood 1907 lost to flood	arch replaced footbridge		Paterson	40°55′47″N 74°09′55″W			
Straight Street Bridge		1907; 2003 restored	Pennsylvania (petit) truss	Straight Street; North Bridge Street; CR 650	Paterson	40°55′35″N 74°09′58″W	1600014		
Arch Street Bridge		1905; 2008 rehab	Parker truss	Arch Street	Paterson	40°55′24″N 74°10′12″W	1600015	Public Service	
Main Street aka Temple Street Bridge	1905 Bridge 1998 Bridge	1905; 1998 rebuilt		Main Street	Paterson	40°55′20″N 74°10′22″W	1600016		
Totowa Bridge		pre 1737 ?? removed	wooden		Paterson	40°55′18″N 74°10′28″W		Acquackanonk Bridge	
West Broadway Bridge		1897; 2004 restore	Melan type concrete arch	Paterson-Hamburg Turnpike; West Broadway; County Route 509; CR 673	Paterson	40°55′16″N 74°10′30″W	1600017	NJRHP #3959 (SHPO)	
Mulberry Street aka Alfano Island Bridge				to Alfano Island	Paterson	40°55′13″N 74°10′32″W			
Footbridge (proposed)			pedestrian path bike path	over Alfano Island	Paterson	40°55′09″N 74°10′38″W			
Chasm Bridge; Paterson Great Falls National Historical Park		1827; 1844; 1868; 1888; 1944	utility footbridge (former)	water pipes and pedestrian path	Paterson	40°54′58″N 74°10′52″W		NJRHP #2362; NRHP #7000391	original known as Clinton Btidge
Footbridge; Paterson Great Falls National Historical Park		1971	footbridge	pedestrian path	Paterson	40°54′58″N 74°10′52″W		NJRHP #2362; NRHP #7000391	
Island Dam aka SUM Dam		c.1794 1840	dam		Paterson	40°54′56″N 74°10′55″W		Society for Establishing Useful Manufactures; NJRHP #2362; NRHP #7000391	
Footbridge at Paterson Great Falls National Historical Park			footbridge	pedestrian path	Paterson	40°54′55″N 74°10′53″W		over cove of Passaic; NJRHP #2362; NRHP #7000391	
Wayne Avenue		1985 opened 2018 rebuilt (planned)		Wayne Avenue; CR 673	Paterson	40°54′55″N 74°10′55″W	1600018		
Spruce Street Bridge		c.1931 1985 replaced			Paterson	40°54′53″N 74°10′56″W	1600018		
Westside Park Footbridge	Postcard View		footbridge	pedestrian path	Paterson	40°54′44″N 74°11′08″W			
Lincoln Bridge		removed		over island Paterson, Passaic and Rutherford Electric Railway	Paterson	40°54′29″N 74°11′44″W		Lido Venice Club (closed)	
Glover Avenue Bridge				Glover Avenue; CR 636	Paterson & Woodland Park - Totowa	40°54′27″N 74°11′45″W	16002020	Holy Sepulchre Cemetery	
Hillery Street Bridge	1898 Bridge Postcard View 1973 Bridge 2009 Bridge	1898; 1973 rehab 2009 rehab	Pratt pony truss	Hillery Street; Totowa Road; CR 644	Totowa - Woodland Park	40°54′15″N 74°12′02″W	1600039		
Paterson High Bridge milepost 18.00		1964 removed	rail Plate girder	Boonton Branch; Erie-Lackawanna Railroad; DL&W	Totowa - Woodland Park	40°53′47″N 74°12′04″W			
Christopher Columbus Highway		1964; 2009 repaired		Interstate 80 milepoint 56.34	Totowa - Woodland Park	40°53′46″N 74°12′05″W	1610153	NJDOT	
Lackawanna Avenue		1894; 1965 rehab 1976 rehab		Lackawanna Avenue part of original westbound Route 46	Totowa - Woodland Park	40°53′30″N 74°13′05″W	1600021		
Passaic Valley Water Commission			utility	Passaic Valley Water Commission water main	Totowa - Woodland Park	40°53′27″N 74°13′09″W			
Passaic River Bridge		1939; 1998 rehab	open spandrel	U.S. Route 46 milepoint 57.94	Totowa - Little Falls	40°53′25″N 74°13′12″W	1606158	Morris Goodkind; NJDOT	
Passaic Valley Water Commission			utility	PVWC water main	Totowa - Little Falls	40°52′59″N 74°13′52″W			
Little Falls Water Treatment Plant		c1925		access road	Totowa	40°52′59″N 74°13′52″W			
Little Falls Aqueduct		1828 c1925 remove	stone arch navigable aqueduct	Morris Canal	Totowa - Little Falls	40°52′59″N 74°13′52″W			
Union Avenue Bridge replaced Beatties Bridge		1850; 1890; 1966; 1995	covered (original)	Union Avenue; CR 646 over uninhabited island	Little Falls; Wayne	40°53′01″N 74°13′59″W	1600022	Little Falls Station; NJ Route 62	
Union Avenue				Union Avenue; CR 646 over uninhabited island	Totowa; Wayne	40°53′04″N 74°13′57″W	1600022	NJ Route 62	
Beatties Dam; Little Falls		1899	dam		Totowa - Little Falls	40°53′03″N 74°14′04″W			
Montclair-Boonton Line milepost 19.43		4004???	rail	Montclair-Boonton Line (NJT); New York and Greenwood Lake Railway (Erie)	Singac, Little Falls - Wayne	40°53′18″N 74°14′45″W			
Newark-Pompton Turnpike		1916; 1988 rehab	concrete arch	Newark-Pompton Turnpike; NJ Route 23 milepoint 4.52	Singac, Little Falls - Wayne	40°53′16″N 74°14′48″W	1604150		
Route 46 Passaic River Bridge dual bridges		1927 EB 1951 WB; 2008 rehab		U.S. Route 46 milepoint 55.45	Wayne - Fairfield Township	40°53′33″N 74°15′57″W	0722157; 0722158	Morris Goodkind; NJDOT	
Christopher Columbus Highway dual bridges		1967; 1988 rehab		Interstate 80 milepoint 52.87	Wayne - Fairfield Township	40°53′39″N 74°16′00″W	0726155 EB; 0726156 WB	NJDOT	
Two Bridges Road		1928		Two Bridges Road	Fairfield Township - Lincoln Park	40°53′50″N 74°16′22″W	070M060	William A. Stickel; At the confluence with the Pompton River	
Horseneck Road Bridge		1906; 2000 replace		Horseneck Road	Fairfield Township - Montville	40°52′56″N 74°20′24″W	1400282		
Christopher Columbus Highway dual bridges	EB WB	1968	stringer/multi-beam or girder	Interstate 80 milepoint 48.46	Fairfield Township - Montville	40°52′04″N 74°19′52″W	1415157 EB; 1415158 WB	Great Piece Meadows; NJDOT	
Route 46 Passaic River Bridge		1940; 2008 rebuilt		U.S. Route 46 milepoint 51.85	Fairfield Township - Pine Brook, Montville	40°51′45″N 74°19′16″W	1410159	Great Piece Meadows; NJDOT	
Pine Brook Bridge dual bridges	EB WB	c.1940 1981 reenforce		Bloomfield Avenue; NJ Route 159 milepoint 0.32	Fairfield Township - Pine Brook, Montville	40°51′31″N 74°19′09″W	1430152 EB; 1430153 WB	Great Piece Meadows	
Old Bloomfield Road		1921	stringer	Bloomfield Avenue	Pine Brook, Montville	40°51′35″N 74°19′39″W	1410433	over a branch of the Passaic	
Route 46; NJ Route 159 dual bridges		1940; 1921	stringer	Bloomfield Avenue; U.S. Route 46 milepoint 51.54; NJ Route 159 milepoint 0.25	Pine Brook, Montville	40°51′33″N 74°19′39″W	1431051 EB; 1410158 WB	over a branch of the Passaic	
Essex Freeway dual bridges				Interstate 280 milepoint 3.32	West Essex Park, Roseland - East Hanover	40°49′50″N 74°19′47″W	1410155 EB; 1410154 WB		
Eagle Rock Avenue Bi-County Bridge replaced Swinefield Bridge		1968; 2015 rebuilt		Eagle Rock Avenue; Lenape Trail; CR 611	West Essex Park, Roseland - East Hanover	40°49′39″N 74°20′06″W	1400443		
Morristown and Erie Railway			rail	ME rail spur	Roseland - East Hanover	40°49′06″N 74°20′04″W	6155???	Beaufort Station	
Route 10	1931 Bridge	1931; 2014-17 rebuilt		NJ Route 10 milepoint 17.6-17.9	Livingston - East Hanover	40°48′02″N 74°21′32″W	1402153		
Hanover Cook Bridge	1800s Bridge 1920 Bridge	1920		Newark and Mount Pleasant Turnpike; Old Mt. Pleasant Avenue	Livingston - East Hanover	40°48′00″N 74°21′35″W	070M063	William A. Stickel	
Columbia Turnpike; South Orange Avenue				Columbia Turnpike; South Orange Avenue; County Route 510	Livingston - Florham Park & Hanover	40°46′45″N 74°22′08″W	1400447		
Eisenhower Parkway		unbuilt		Triborough Road	Chatham - Livingston	40°45′30″N 74°22′31″W			
Passaic Avenue		1925 1969 redecked		Passaic Avenue; CR 607	Florham Park - Millburn	40°45′21″N 74°21′41″W	070M065		
Route 24		1975	culvert	NJ Route 24 milepoint 5.98	Chatham	40°44′34″N 74°22′14″W	1422161	over branch of the Passaic	
Route 24 dual bridges		1971		NJ Route 24 milepoint 6.52	Chatham - Millburn	40°44′34″N 74°22′14″W	1733154 EB; 1733153 WB		
Main Street westbound				NJ Route 124	Chatham - Millburn	40°44′22″N 74°22′18″W	1406157		
Main Street; Morris Turnpike eastbound		1874; 1909		Main Street; Morris Turnpike; NJ Route 124	Chatham - Millburn	40°44′21″N 74°22′18″W	1406158	Hobart Gap	
Edwards Mill Bridge		1916	concrete arch	Summit Avenue	Chatham - Summit (Passaic River Parkway)	40°44′04″N 74°22′39″W	1400514		
Bonnel's Bridge		1925	stringer	Watchung Avenue; CR 646	Chatham - Summit (Passaic River Parkway)	40°43′44″N 74°22′45″W	1400515	Shunpike Road	
Morristown Line milepost 22.31			rail	Morristown Line (NJT); EL; DL&W; Morris and Essex	Chatham - Summit (Passaic River Parkway)	40°43′33″N 74°23′13″W	4006???	NJRHP #234 (SHPO); NJT # 319	
Spillway Dam			spillway dam		Chatham - Summit (Passaic River Parkway)	40°43′34″N 74°23′21″W			
Page Mill Bridge		1929	stringer	Stanley Avenue	Chatham - Summit (Passaic River Parkway)	40°43′34″N 74°23′23″W	1400516		
Mt. Vernon Avenue		1906; 1974 rehab 1989 rehab	steel through girder	Mt. Vernon Avenue	Chatham - Summit (Passaic River Parkway)	40°43′13″N 74°23′27″W	1400520		
Passaic Street				Passaic Street	Chatham - New Providence (Passaic River Parkway)	40°42′48″N 74°24′26″W	2011060		
Central Avenue; Fairmont Avenue		1928	stringer	Central Avenue; Fairmont Avenue	Chatham - New Providence (Passaic River Parkway)	40°42′06″N 74°25′37″W	2011062		
Bridge Avenue; Snyder Avenue		1927	stringer	Bridge Avenue; Snyder Avenue	Chatham - Berkeley Heights	40°41′23″N 74°26′23″W	2001001		
Valley Road; Springfield Avenue		1936	girder	Valley Road; Springfield Avenue; CR 512	Berkeley Heights (Passaic River Parkway) - Gillette, Long Hill Township	40°40′47″N 74°27′06″W	2001017		
Gladstone Branch milepost 26.27			rail	Gladstone Branch (NJT); EL; DL&W	Berkeley Heights (Passaic River Parkway) - Gillette, Long Hill Township	40°40′47″N 74°27′06″W	4009???	aka Townley Bridge; Morris and Essex Railroad; New Jersey West Line Railroad	
Hillcrest Road; Mountain Avenue		1998	stringer	Mountain Avenue; Hillcrest Road; County Route 531	Gillette, Long Hill Township - Warren Township	40°40′14″N 74°27′52″W	18L1109		
Stirling Road; Plainfield Road		1993	slab	Stirling Road; Plainfield Road; CR 653	Long Hill Township - Warren Township	40°39′58″N 74°28′56″W	18L1108		
Valley Road		1930-31	stringer	Valley Road; County Route 512	Millington, Long Hill Township - Bernards Township	40°39′53″N 74°31′47″W	18H1110		
Stonehouse Road Bridge	1923 Bridge 2009 Bridge	1923; 2009 replace	arch	Stonehouse Rd. Haas Road	Millington, Long Hill Township - Bernards Township	40°40′16″N 74°31′33″W	1400540	Millington Station	
Millington High Bridge milepost 30.47		1928	rail	Gladstone Branch (NJT); EL; DL&W	Millington, Long Hill Township - Bernards Township	40°40′39″N 74°31′40″W	4009???	Morris and Essex Railroad; New Jersey West Line Railroad; NJT #104	
Davis Bridge				South Maple Avenue; Basking Ridge Road; CR 657	Millington, Long Hill Township - Bernards Township	40°40′53″N 74°31′43″W	1400541		
White Bridge		1890; 1952 reinforce		Lord Stirling Road; White Bridge Road	Lord Stirling Park; Millington, Long Hill Township - Basking Ridge	40°41′40″N 74°30′52″W	1400563	Great Swamp National Wildlife Refuge	
Osborn Pond Dam			Dam		Bernards Township - Harding Township	40°43′16″N 74°31′56″W			
Madisonville Road; Lee's Hill Road		1975	box beam	Lee's Hill Road; Madisonville Road	Bernards Township - Harding Township	40°43′16″N 74°31′55″W	18H1305		
Interstate 287 dual bridges	NB SB	NB 1968; SB 1966	culvert	Interstate 287 milepoint 30.17; Marine Hector Cafferata Jr. Congressional Medal of Honor Highway	Bernards Township - Harding Township	40°43′55″N 74°32′16″W	1815182 NB; 1815183 SB		
Mt. Kemble Avenue; Morristown Road	1924 Bridge	1924 2012 rebuilt		Mt. Kemble Avenue; Morristown Road; US Route 202 milepoint 39.06	Bernards Township - Harding Township	40°44′01″N 74°32′24″W	1809158		
Van Dorans Mill Dam			milldam		Bernards Township - Harding Township	40°44′00″N 74°32′34″W			
Hardscrabble Road Extension			private way		Harding Township	40°44′26″N 74°32′56″W		At confluence with Indian Grove Brook	
Patriots' Path			footbridge	Patriots' Path	Bernardsville	40°45′07″N 74°33′05″W		Morristown National Historical Park; New Jersey Brigade Encampment Site; NJRHP #3381; NRHP #66000053	
Leddell Road; Jockey Hollow Road			culvert	Leddell Road; Jockey Hollow Road	Bernardsville	40°45′25″N 74°33′18″W	1400658	Morristown National Historical Park; New Jersey Brigade Encampment Site; NJRHP #3381; NRHP #66000053	
Leddell Road				Leddell Road	Mendham Township	40°45′40″N 74°33′15″W		Morristown National Historical Park; New Jersey Brigade Encampment Site; NJRHP #3381; NRHP #66000053	
Tempe Wick Road				Tempe Wick Road; CR 646	Mendham Township	40°45′58″N 74°33′16″W		Morristown National Historical Park; New Jersey Brigade Encampment Site; NJRHP #3381; NRHP #66000053	
Ledells Dam aka Washington Corners Dam			milldam		Mendham Township	40°45′59″N 74°33′16″W		NJRHP #5410; NJRHP #316; NRHP #00000959; Tempe Wick Road-Washington Corners Historic District; Tributary sources in vicinity of West Morris Mendham High School	
Corey Lane				Corey Lane	Mendham Township	40°46′09″N 74°33′41″W		NJRHP #5410; NJRHP #316; NRHP #00000959; Tempe Wick Road-Washington Corners Historic District; Tributary sources in vicinity of West Morris Mendham High School	
Tempe Wick Road				Tempe Wick Road; CR 646	Mendham Township	40°46′18″N 74°34′11″W		NJRHP #5410; NJRHP #316; NRHP #00000959; Tempe Wick Road-Washington Corners Historic District; Tributary sources in vicinity of West Morris Mendham High School	
Corey Lane			culvert	Corey Lane	Mendham Township	40°45′51″N 74°34′32″W		NJRHP #5410; NJRHP #316; NRHP #00000959; Tempe Wick Road-Washington Corners Historic District; Tributary sources in vicinity of West Morris Mendham High School	
Hardscrabble Road			culvert	Hardscrabble Road	Mendham Borough	40°45′46″N 74°34′37″W		NJRHP #5410; NJRHP #316; NRHP #00000959; Tempe Wick Road-Washington Corners Historic District; Tributary sources in vicinity of West Morris Mendham High School	

== Abbreviations and definitions ==
- CR=County Route
- DL&W=Delaware, Lackawanna and Western Railroad
- Dual bridges=two separate parallel structures on same highway
- Erie=Erie Railroad
- EB=Eastbound
- EL=Erie Lackawanna Railway
- FRA=Federal Railroad Administration
- ME=Morristown and Erie Railway
- MP=Milepoint, milepost, (mile marker) distance from point of origin of train line, beginning of highway, or distance from river mouth
- NB=Northbound
- NBI=National Bridge Inventory
- NRHP=National Register of Historic Places
- NJDOT=New Jersey Department of Transportation
- NJM=New Jersey Midland Railway
- NJRHP=New Jersey Register of Historic Places
- NJT=New Jersey Transit Rail Operations
- NJTPA=North Jersey Transportation Planning Authority
- NJTA=New Jersey Turnpike Authority
- NYS&W=New York, Susquehanna and Western Railway
- NS=Norfolk Southern Railway
- PVWC=Passaic Valley Water Commission
- SB=Southbound
- SHPO=State Historic Preservation Office
- WB=Westbound

== See also ==
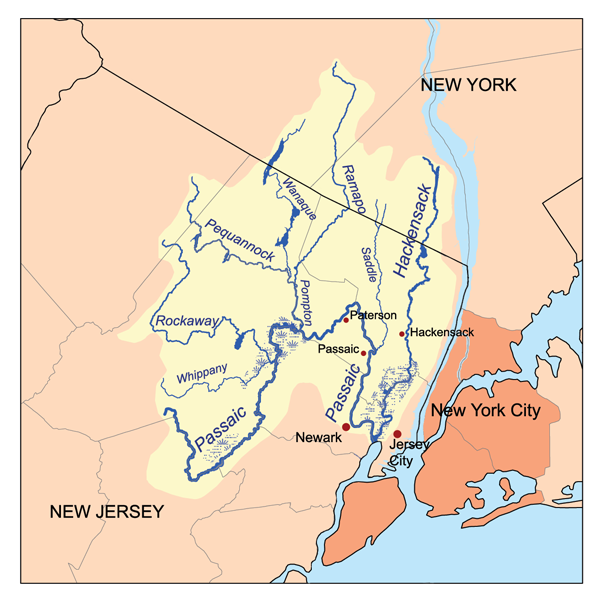
The course and watershed of the Passaic and area of the prehistoric Lake Passaic

- List of dams and reservoirs in New Jersey
- Passaic River Flood Tunnel
- List of crossings of the Hackensack River
- List of bridges, tunnels, and cuts in Hudson County
- List of bridges documented by the Historic American Engineering Record in New Jersey
- List of county routes in Bergen County, New Jersey
- List of county routes in Passaic County, New Jersey
- List of county routes in Morris County, New Jersey
- Passaic River Coalition

== Sources ==
- "Historic Bridge Survey (1991-1994)". NJDOT. 2001.
- "New Jersey and National Registers of Historic Places". NJ DEP - State Historic Preservation Office.
- "Masonry and Metal The Historic Bridges of Bergen County, New Jersey" (PDF). Richard Grubb and Associates. 2008.
- "Bridges over the Passaic River". Passaic River Basin.
- "Bridgehunter: Passaic River".
- "BridgesNYC".
- Jag9889 (August 5, 2007). "Passaic River Bridges". Flickr.
- "National Bridge Inventory Database". Archived from the original on February 2, 2019.
- Olsen, Kevin K. (2008), A Great Conveniency A Maritime History of the Passaic River, Hackensack River, and Newark Bay, American History Imprints, ISBN 9780975366776
- "County Routes". Passaic County. Archived from the original (PDF) on January 17, 2017.
- "Passaic County Road System". Passaic County. 2001. Archived from the original on July 28, 2016.
- Bauer, Ruth (May 2001). "Street Name Changes Paterson, NJ". Passaic County Historical Society.
- "National Bridge Inventory 2015 (NJ) NBI ASCII Files: Disclaimer Title 23 - United States Code Section409 - Discovery and Admission as Evidence of Certain Reports and Surveys". Federal Highway Administration. August 5, 2015.
- "Interim Bridge Report" (PDF). NJDOT. August 9, 2007.
- Title 33 of the Code of Federal RegulationsNavigation and Navigable Waters PART 117—DRAWBRIDGE OPERATION REGULATIONS Subpart B—Specific Requirements, New Jersey
