= Route 46 Passaic River Bridge =

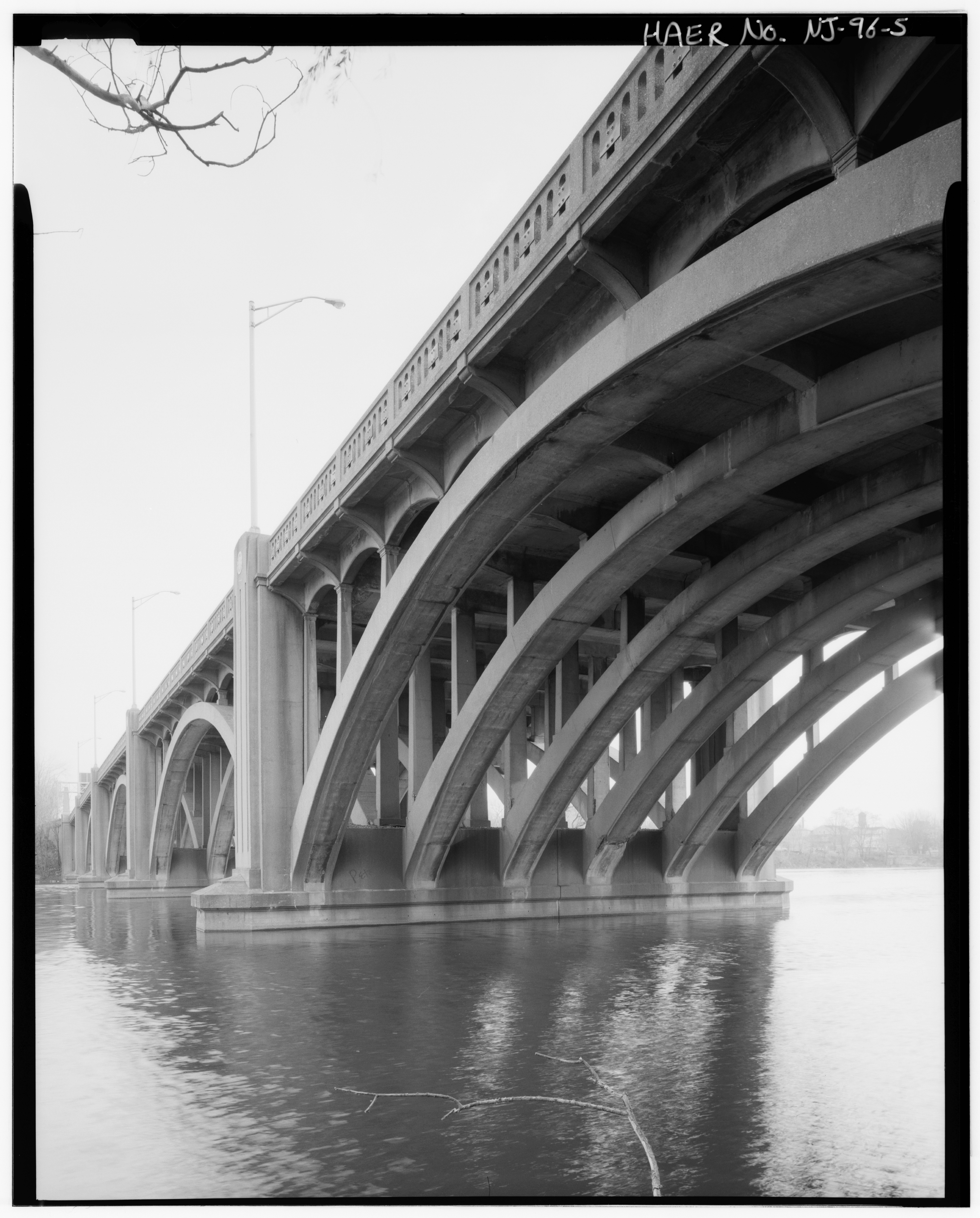
Passaic River Bridge

The Route 46 Passaic River Bridge can refer to a number of bridges that carry U.S. Route 46 (US 46) over the Passaic River in Northern New Jersey. US 46 was originally developed as Route 6 under the direction of Morris Goodkind who was chief engineer of the New Jersey Highway Department (predecessor to the New Jersey Department of Transportation) from 1922 until 1955.

The highway is designated the United Spanish War Veterans Memorial Highway. It crosses the river several times as both wind their way through Bergen, Passaic, Essex, and Morris counties. To the east the highway also crosses the Hackensack River on the Winant Avenue Bridge and the Hudson River (to the state line) on the George Washington Bridge. To the west the highway crosses several of the Passaic's tributaries.

== Route 6 (1927–1953) and Route 46 (1953–present) ==
The expansion of the highway system followed the opening of the George Washington Bridge.

In the 1927 New Jersey state highway renumbering Route 6 was assigned to the route across northern New Jersey, using the old Route 5 from Delaware to Netcong, Route 12 from Hackettstown to Paterson, and a generally new alignment parallel to Route 10 from Paterson to the proposed George Washington Bridge. In Paterson, Route 6 was marked along city streets including McBride Avenue, Spruce Street and Market Street.

In 1929, Route 6 was redefined to use none of the old road east of Paterson (it had formerly been planned to use Market Street west of roughly where Route 17 now crosses it), and Route 5 was cut back to run only east from Ridgefield. Route 6 was redefined to bypass Paterson to the south. The new highway would enter Paterson just south of Market Street, but then turn south and southwest before heading west to rejoin the route at the Little Falls bypass at the Union Boulevard crossing. The old road along Union Boulevard towards Paterson was assigned Route S6, as a spur of Route 6. Route S6 became Route 62 in the 1953 New Jersey state highway renumbering, and has since been truncated to a short distance between US 46 and I-80 in Totowa. By 1937, most of Route 6 had been completed with the exception of the Paterson bypass. A realignment at the Passaic River crossing near Pine Brook was built in the 1940s, along with a new road for a short distance west from Pine Brook.

The Route 6 designation was dropped in favor of US 46 in the 1953 renumbering.

== Bridges ==
Bridge aesthetics and the use of concrete for its moldable qualities characterized 1920-1930s New Jersey State Highway Department bridge design. The NJ 6 bridges use motifs seen on other bridges in the state. The encased steel stringer spans have Moderne-style concrete pilasters and balustrades establishing coherent design to the route. The bridges that carried NJ 6 over the Passaic River were given special attention. and are among the most distinguished and elaborate bridges in the state in their use of reinforced concrete open spandrel arches creating graceful and elegant forms which displays both structural efficiency and architectural style. The three NJ 6 open spandrel arch bridges (two over the river and another built 1939, NBI#1607163, over Lakeview Avenue in Clifton) are embellished with tile mosaics of the state seal, battered light standards, and stepped pilasters.

The Passaic River Bridge at Paterson and Passaic River Bridge at Totowa are significant sophisticated examples of an open spandrel arch, reinforced concrete highway bridge and are representative of approximately ten of the type designed and built by the New Jersey State Highway Department between 1929 and 1939 as part the expansion of the state highway system. In the 1990s, the New Jersey Department of Transportation (NJDOT) Historic Bridge Survey recommended the New Jersey State Historic Preservation Officer determine that they were eligible for inclusion on the state and federal registers of historic places

Crossing	Dates	Type	Locale/Municipality	Coordinates	NBI	Notes	References
Route 46; MP 64.52	1955	culvert	Elmwood Park	40°53′38″N 74°07′44″W	0220152	over branch of the Passaic	
Passaic River Bridge aka Crooks Avenue Bridge; MP 63.95	c.1937 1995 rebuild	open spandrel (false concrete arch;true steel girder)	Paterson - Elmwood Park	40°53′38″N 74°07′44″W	1607168	Cedar Lawn Cemetery site of Weasel Bridge, Cadmus Ford Bridge	
Passaic River Bridge; MP 57.94	1939; 1998 rehab	open spandrel	Totowa - Little Falls	40°53′25″N 74°13′12″W	1606158		
Route 46 dual bridges MP 55.45	c.1927 1951 second bridge		Wayne - Fairfield Township	40°53′33″N 74°15′57″W	EB 0722157; WB 0722158		
Route 46; MP 51.85	1940; 2008 rebuilt	stringer	Fairfield Township - Pine Brook, Montville	40°51′45″N 74°19′16″W	1410159	Great Piece Meadows	
Pine Brook Bridge dual bridges Bloomfield Avenue; Route 159	c.1940 1981 reinforce	stringer	Fairfield Township - Pine Brook, Montville	40°51′31″N 74°19′09″W	1430153	originally built as part of Route 6 Great Piece Meadows	
Bloomfield Avenue; U.S. Route 46; MP 51.54; Route 159 MP 0.25 dual bridges	1940; 1921	stringer	Pine Brook, Montville	40°51′33″N 74°19′39″W	WB-1410158; EB-1431051	over a branch of the Passaic	

== Gallery ==
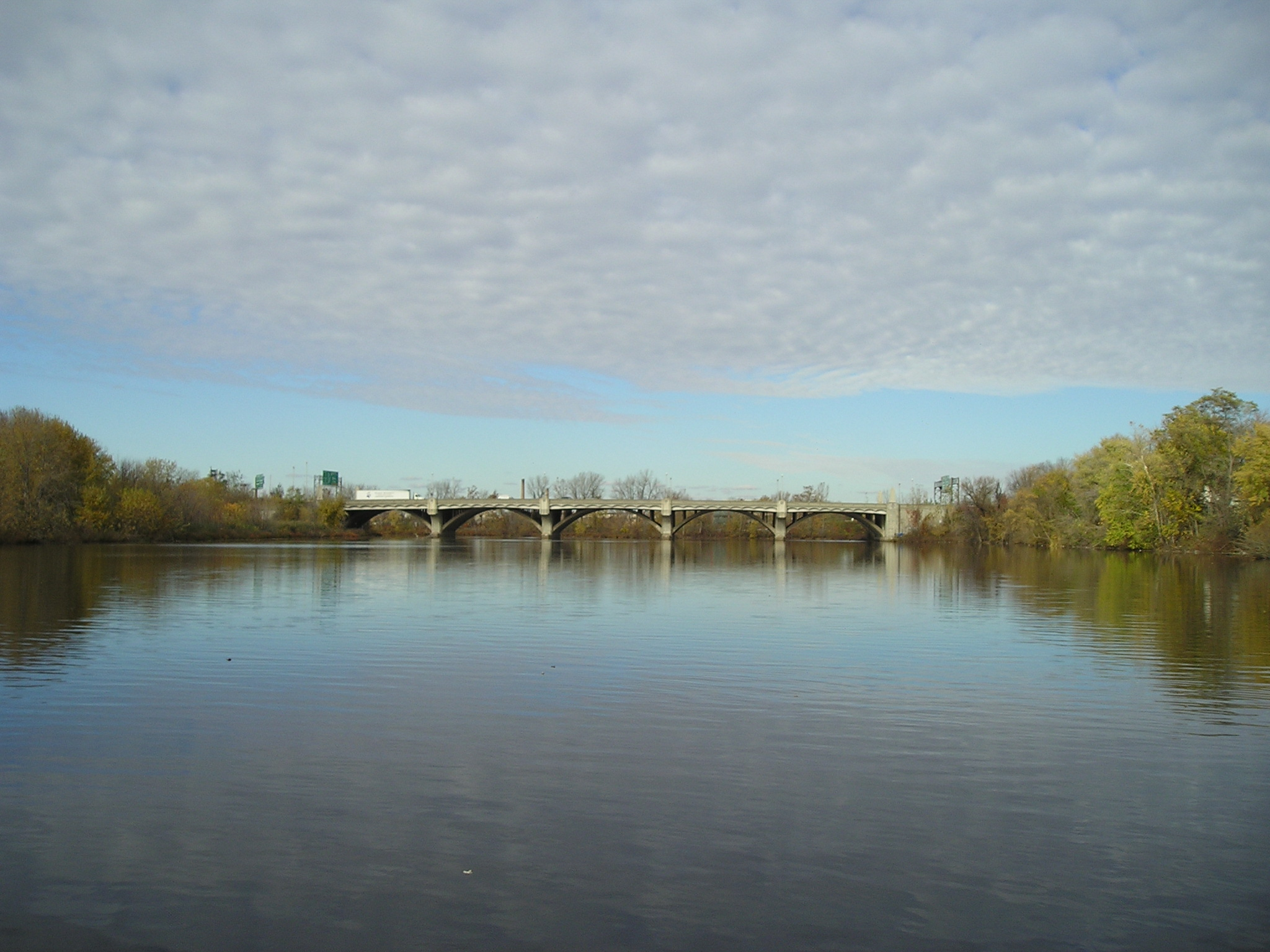
At Paterson

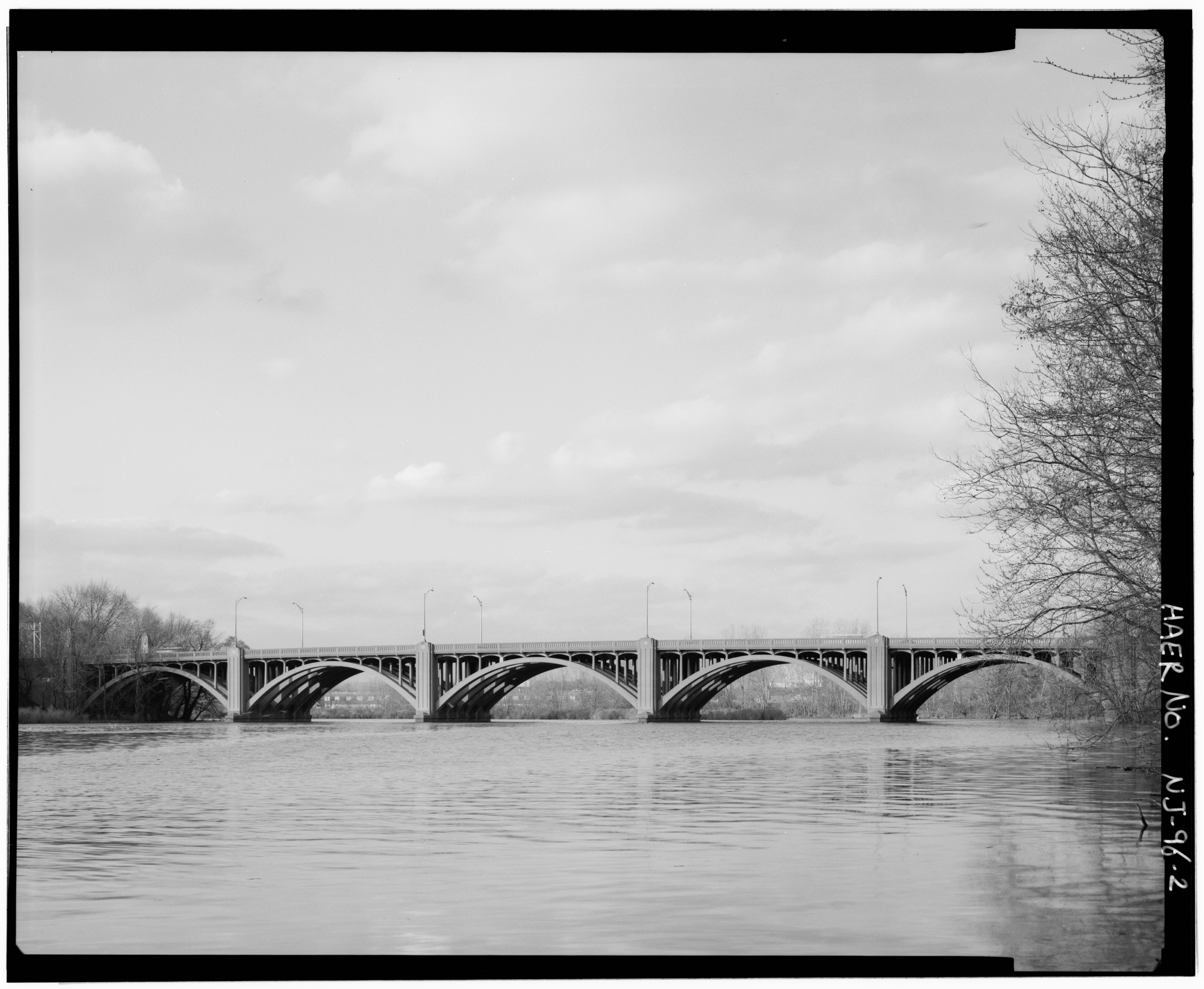
At Paterson

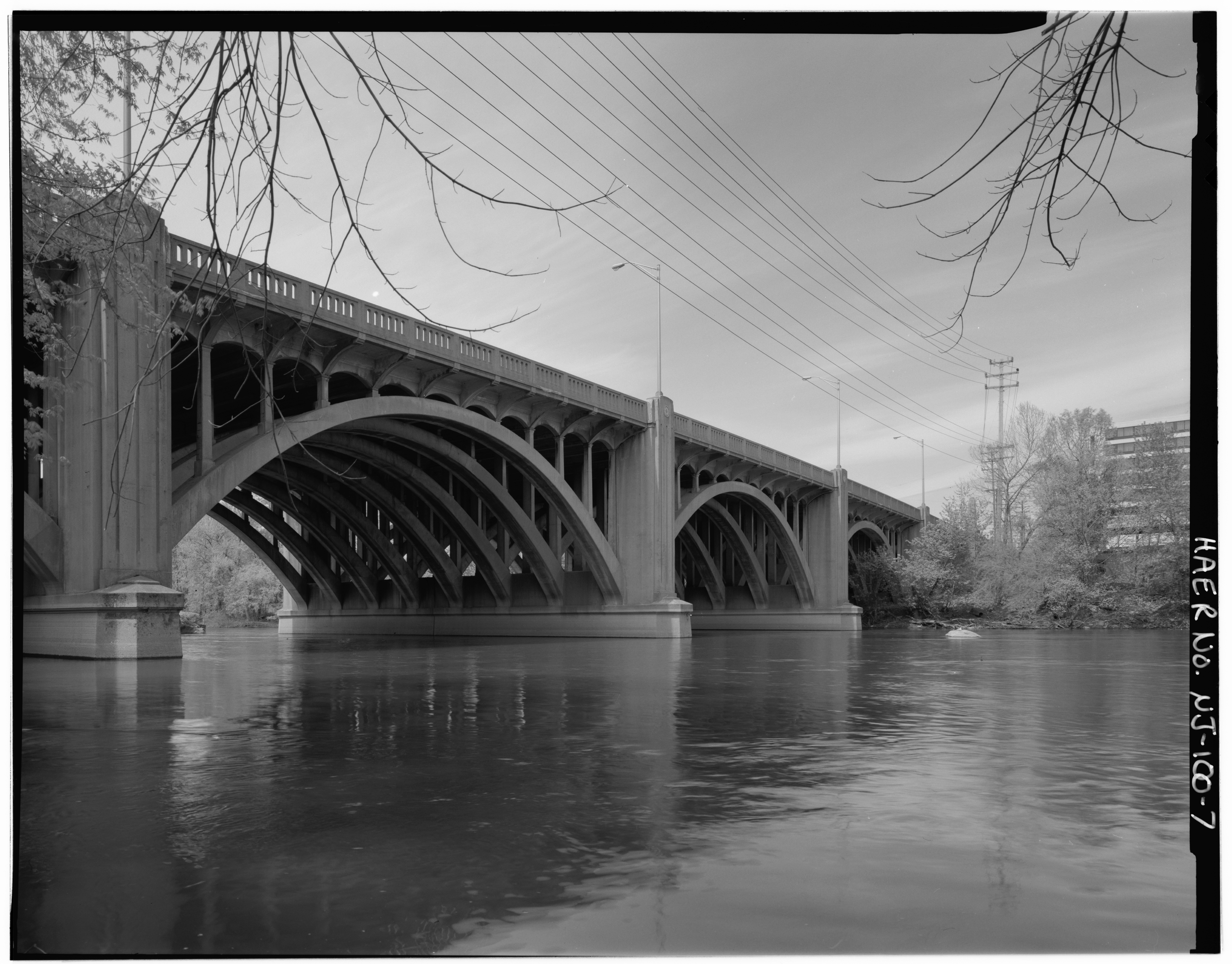
At Totowa

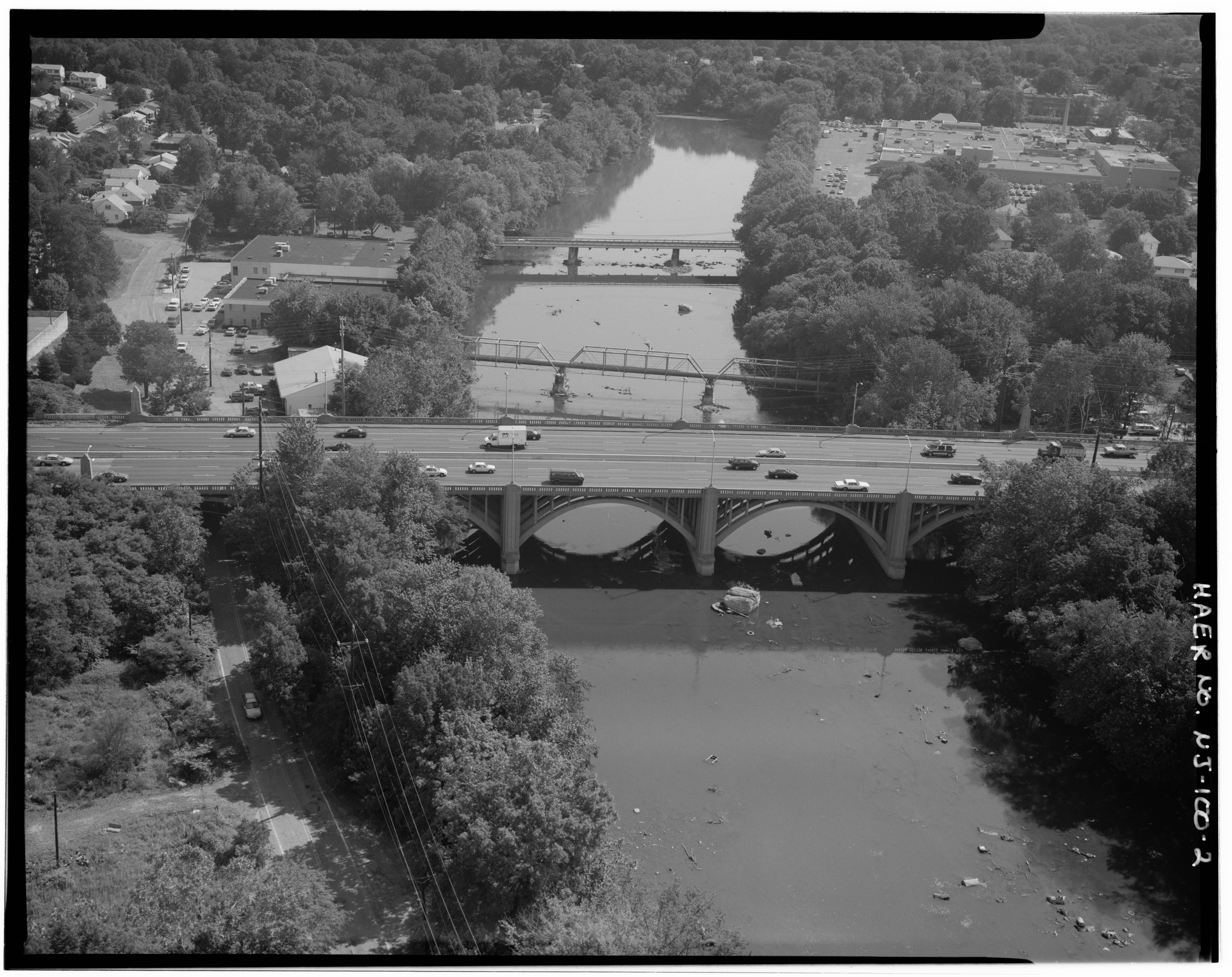
Route 6 originally crossed Lackawanna Avenue just north of Route 46 Totowa bridge

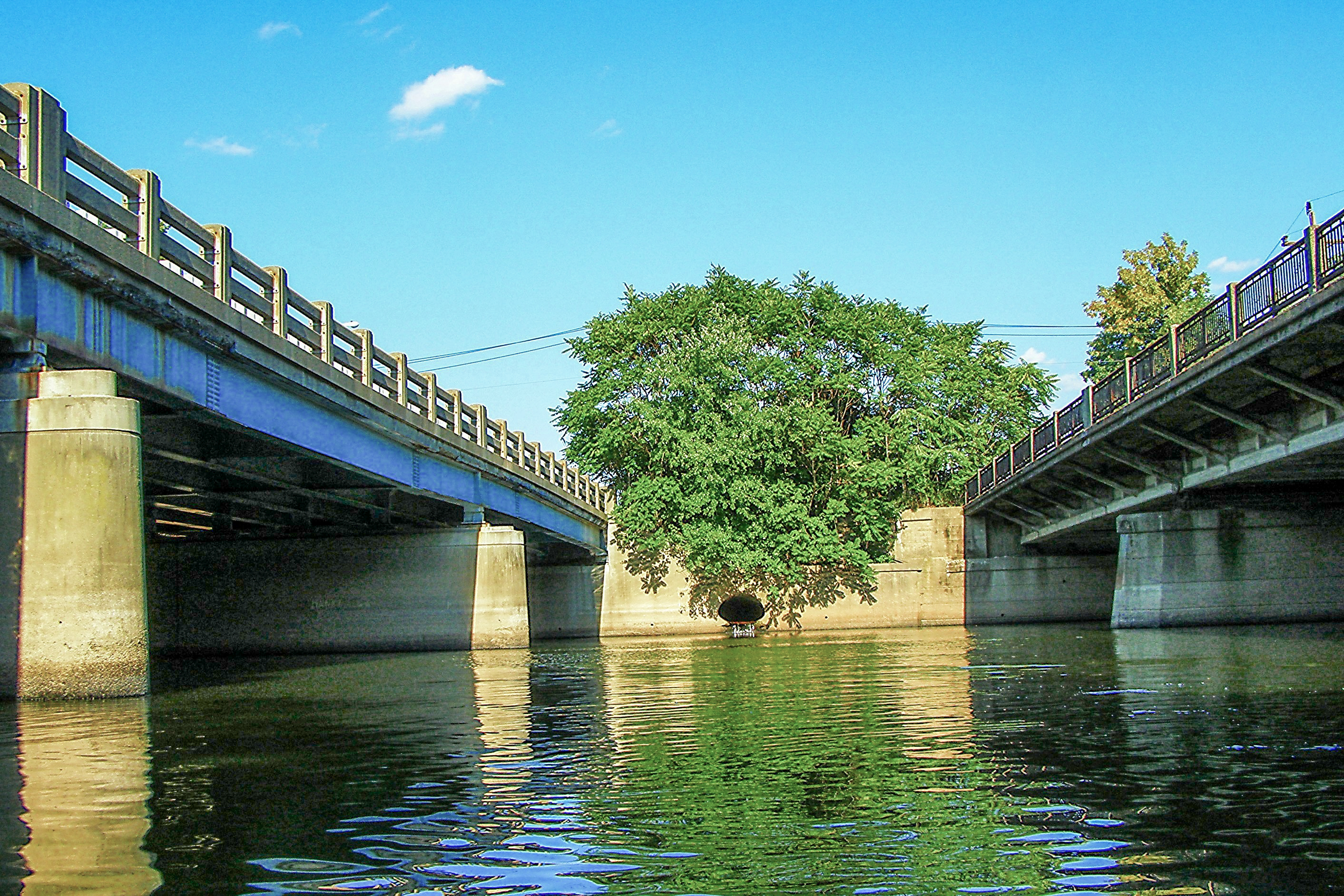
At Wayne - Fairfield

== See also ==
- List of crossings of the Upper Passaic River
- List of crossings of the Lower Passaic River
- List of crossings of the Hackensack River
- List of fixed crossing of the North River (Hudson River)
- List of bridges documented by the Historic American Engineering Record in New Jersey
