= New Jersey Route 58 =

Highway in New Jersey

Route 58

Route information
- Maintained by New Jersey Department of Transportation
- Length: 1.43 mi (2.30 km)
- Existed: 1953 (1939 as SHR 25A)–by 1997

Major junctions
- West end: Orange and Hecker Streets in Newark
- Route 21 in Newark
- East end: CR 508 in Harrison

Location
- Country: United States
- State: New Jersey
- Counties: Essex, Hudson

Highway system
- New Jersey State Highway Routes; Interstate; US; State; Scenic Byways
← Route 57	→ Route 59

Route 58 is a former state highway in the city of Newark, New Jersey and nearby town of Harrison, New Jersey. The highway ran from Orange and Hecker Streets in Newark, eastbound as a four-lane freeway across the William A. Stickel Memorial Bridge (known as the Stickel Bridge) to Harrison, where it terminated at an intersection with County Route 508. The route originates as an alignment of Route 25A, a suffixed spur designated in 1939 of State Highway Route 25. The route was rechristened as Route 58 in the 1953 state highway renumbering. The highway was constructed into Interstate 280 in the 1950s, and the route persisted internally until the 1990s, when it was finally removed as a designation. A stub alignment of Route 58 remains near Hecker and Orange Streets.

== Route description ==
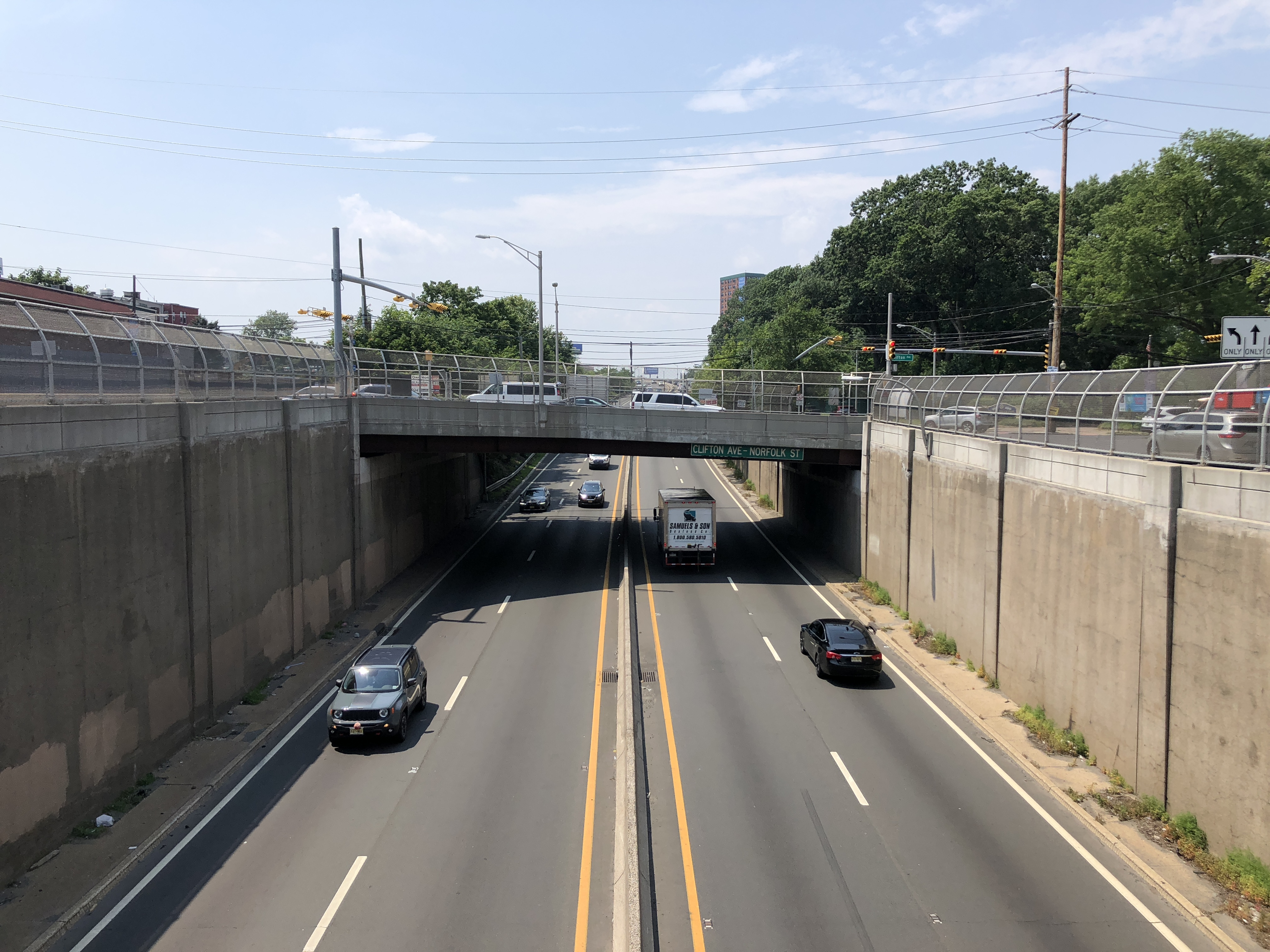
Former section of Route 58 in Newark, currently designated as part of I-280

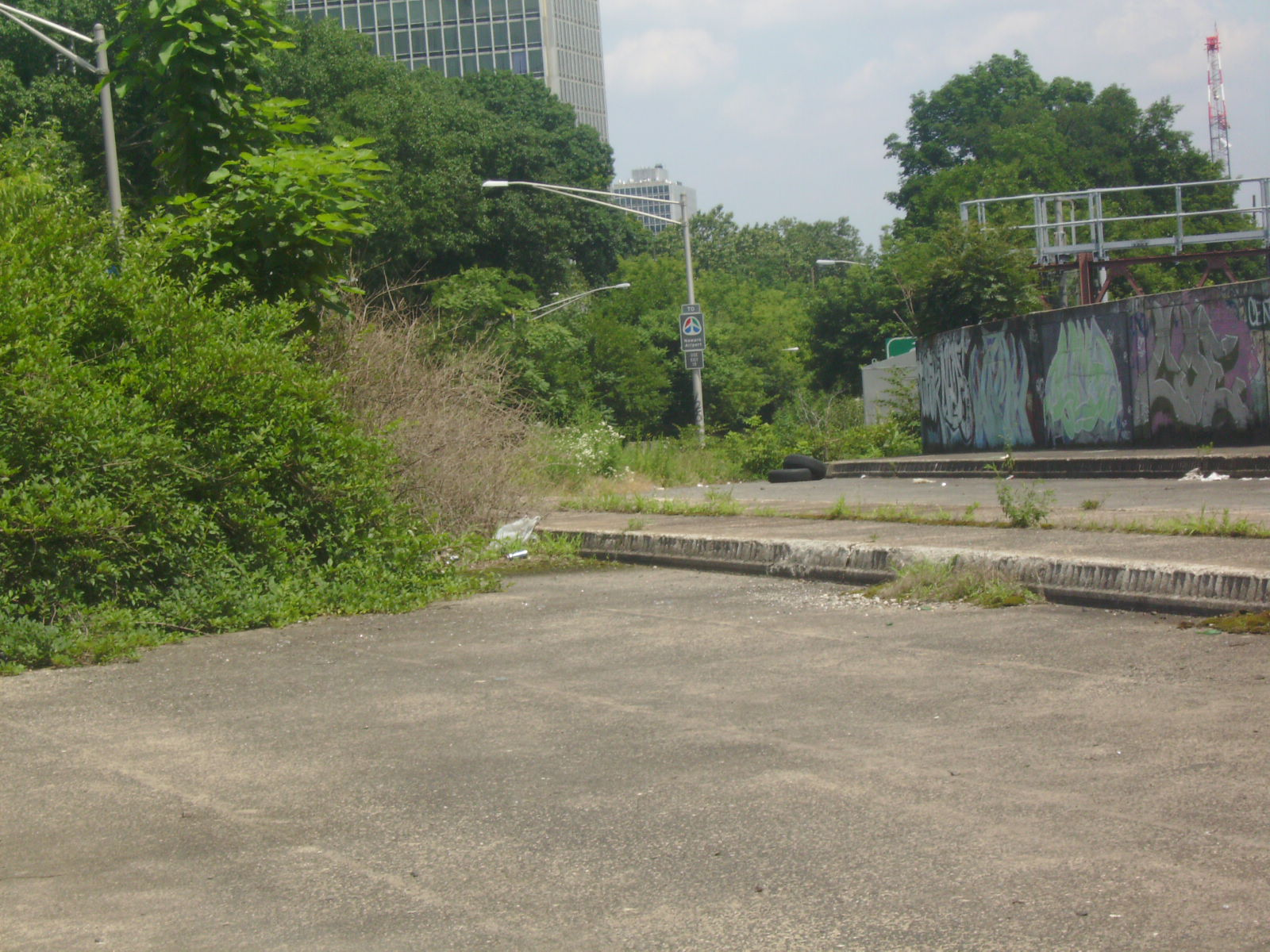
Route 58 stub near Interstate 280 in Newark

Route 58 began at an intersection with Orange Street and Hecker Street in the center of Newark. Paralleling Lackawanna Drive, the highway crossed over the Gladstone Branch, Montclair Branch and Morristown Lines maintained by New Jersey Transit. A four-lane divided highway, Route 58 headed eastward along the Essex Freeway, a short freeway in Newark. The highway interchanged with Clifton Avenue heading westbound and Martin Luther King Boulevard a short distance later. The interchange with Martin Luther King Boulevard accessed the nearby Newark Broad Street Station. A short distance later, Route 58 interchanged with Route 21 nearby. After Route 21, the Essex Freeway crossed on the Stickel Bridge over the Passaic River and into Harrison, where Route 58 interchanged with County Route 508. There the designation terminated.

== History ==
Route 25A (1939-1953)

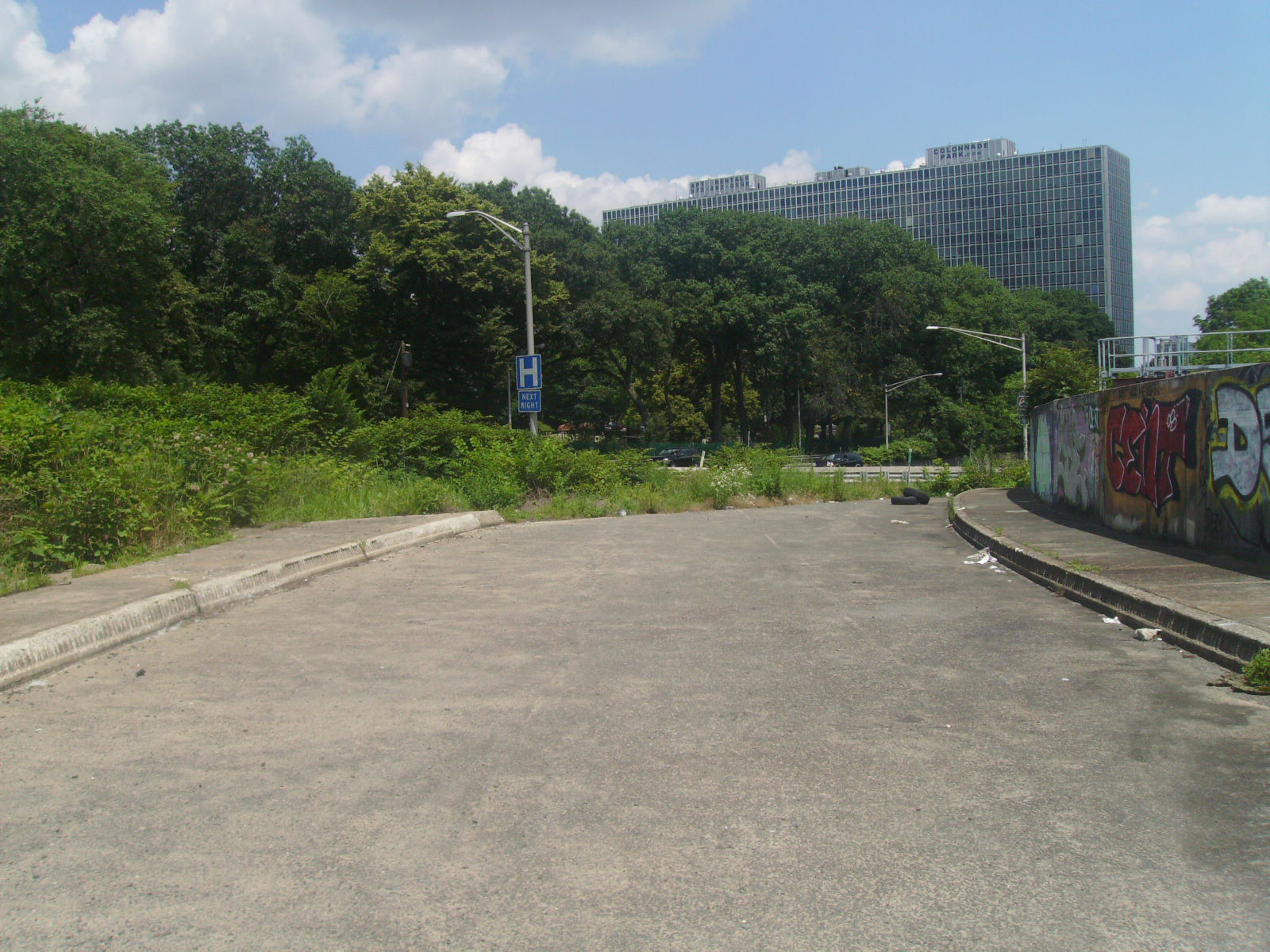
Route 58 stub in Newark

Route 58 originates as an alignment of State Highway Route 25-A, designated in 1939 as a suffixed spur of State Highway Route 25 from Jersey City to Clifton Avenue in Newark. The route was designated to cross through Kearny and Harrison, crossing the Passaic at the Bridge Street Bridge in Harrison. From there, it continued along, intersecting with State Highway Route 21 and Clifton Avenue. In 1949, a new bridge for the four-lane road was constructed, this bridge was named after William Stickel, an engineer from Essex County. That year, the New Jersey State Highway Department proposed construction of a new freeway to help alleviate traffic on the State Highway Route 10 corridor, designated as the Essex Freeway from the New Jersey Turnpike in Hudson County westward to U.S. Route 46 in Morris County.

On January 1, 1953, as part of the 1953 state highway renumbering, State Highway Route 25-A was rechristened as Route 58. In 1954, the State Highway Department decided to find a state highway to include in the new Eisenhower Interstate System. Originally proposed to use the Route 3 alignment for Federal Aid Interstate Route 105, the upgrading of Route 3 for standards would be too great. After Route 3 was deemed unusable, they moved focus to short portion of Route 58 that was constructed. In 1958, the State Highway Department gave Route 58 its official new designation, Interstate 280, when construction began on an extended Essex Freeway. Although Interstate 280 was designated onto Route 58's alignment, the Route 58 designation persisted throughout maps and straight line diagrams until at least 1997, when the designation was removed. A short, unused concrete portion of Route 58 remains at the northern end of Hecker Street, crossing over the New Jersey Transit tracks ending near Interstate 280.

== Major intersections ==
County	Location	mi	km	Destinations	Notes
Essex	Newark	0.00	0.00	Orange Street / Hecker Street	Western terminus
Hudson	Harrison	1.43	2.30	CR 508	Eastern terminus
1.000 mi = 1.609 km; 1.000 km = 0.621 mi

== See also ==
- New Jersey Route 158
