= Passaic River Coalition =

American nonprofit organization

The Passaic River Coalition (PRC) is an organization based out of Willow Hall in Morristown, New Jersey. The coalition is an urban watershed association active since 1969 in protecting water quality and quantity of the entire Passaic River watershed of northern New Jersey and Rockland and Orange Counties, New York.

== History ==
Established in 1969 and incorporated in 1972, the Passaic River Coalition has given valuable assistance and stewardship for the preservation and protection of over 1,000 miles of waterways. The organization has faced the challenges of a watershed beset with every conceivable environmental problem. The coalition has been involved in many topics including:

- Flood Management
- Enlargement of Recreational and Natural Areas
- Enhancement of Water Supply Management
- Improvement of Water Quality
- Ground Water Management

In 1993, a major land trust endowment was made to the PRC to providing funding for land acquisition. With funding from the endowment and matching payments from the New Jersey Department of Environmental Protection, the PRC has now preserved over 1,000 acres of open space. In addition to land preservation, the PRC does riverside conservation, riverfront parks, trail construction, and the creation of urban park recreation.

== Flooding: The Reason for the Passaic River Coalition ==
For many decades, two things have been certain in the Passaic River Basin - floods and flood studies. Actual progress has been less certain. The Passaic River Coalition was formed in 1969 to address this issue and has been a major force ever since, both fending off harmful ideas and promoting effective measures to reduce flood damages without destroying the very resources we are trying to protect.

The Passaic River Basin has a long history of floods. The current record flood was in 1903, when much of the basin was undeveloped but also had been subject to massive deforestation. Major floods have occurred in 1902, 1945, 1968, 1977, 1984, 1999, 2000, 2007, 2010, and 2011.

Between the State and the U.S. Army Corps of Engineers (Corps), we have over a century of flood control studies. At various times, dry flood-storage reservoirs, dual-purpose reservoirs (for both flood control and water supply), river channelization, levees, dikes and tunnels have been proposed. Eventually, non-structural concepts were introduced, such as land preservation and floodplain development controls, but it took decades for these ideas to get far.

In the late 1960s, a Corps plan (called Plan III) included large dams and reservoirs; it was that plan that triggered creation of the PRC. Problems with that plan led to Plan II-B, which led to Congressional requirements in 1976 for new studies. Right after the major flood of 1984, the state endorsed The Pompton/Passaic Dual Inlet Tunnel Diversion Plan. After lengthy debate in which the PRC played a prominent role, in 1996 Governor Whitman removed State support for this project, and the federal Water Resources Development Act of 2000 prohibited design and construction funding for the flood control tunnel. Still, the project remains authorized. Most recently, in 2011 the Corps was asked by New Jersey to reevaluate six mainstem alternatives, in response to the Passaic River Basin Flood Advisory Commission. The Corps found that three may remain economically justified, though all are very expensive and New Jersey would need to pay 35 percent:

- Alternative 14A – Levees, Floodwalls, and Non-Structural Plan ($3.1 billion)
- Non-Structural Plan for areas affected by the “10-year floods” ($1.2 billion)
- Diversion Tunnel ($4.7 billion)

Late this year, the Corps anticipates submitting a new evaluation to New Jersey for review. The Corps also plans to provide new reports on the lower portion of the tidal Passaic (addressing storm surge issues in Kearny, Harrison and Newark), and in the Lower Saddle River. In other words, Passaic Basin interests will need to engage with three major Corps reports very soon.

Meanwhile, some smaller-scale projects have been completed by the Corps, including Molly Ann Brook in Passaic County, the Ramapo River flood control project, and wetlands purchases. The state has also been active, with improved controls over wetlands and flood plain development, and land preservation (with help from many others). The latter includes the acquisition of houses with repetitive flood damages (Blue Acres), where the houses are torn down and the land dedicated to riverside park lands. Morris County has also helped fund such work, notably in Pequannock Township, and the Passaic River Coalition has been active in Little Falls Township.

== Properties ==
Since the Land Trust's creation in 1993, the PRC has acquired 20 properties in 6 counties (Passaic, Morris, Bergen, Essex, Sussex, and Somerset), 20 municipalities, and a total of almost 900 acres. The properties are:

- Bat Cave - Rockaway, NJ
- Butler Forest Preserve - Butler, NJ
- Butler Raceway - Butler, NJ
- Cynthia's Landing - Denville, NJ
- Farley Road - Millburn, NJ
- Federal Hill - Bloomingdale, NJ
- Hickory Road - Ringwood, NJ
- Long Hill Wetlands I, II, and III - Long Hill, NJ
- Lyndhurst Greenway 1, 2, 3, and 4 - Lyndhurst, NJ
- Mahwah River - Mahwah, NJ
- Morsetown Brook Wetland Preserve - West Milford, NJ
- Pine Island 1 - West Milford, NJ
- River Road Acres - Chatham NJ
- River Road Easement - Chatham, NJ
- Russia Brook Sanctuary I and II - Jefferson, Hardyston, and Sparta, NJ
- Hope Forest Reserve - West Milford, NJ
- Tory Tract - Ringwood, NJ
- Twin Brooks - Ringwood, NJ
- Waterview - Ringwood, NJ
- Willow Hall - Morristown, NJ

== See also ==
- List of crossings of the Upper Passaic River
