= New Jersey Route 158 =

State highway in New Jersey

Route 158
- Centre Street Bridge
- Route 158 highlighted in red

Route information
- Maintained by NJDOT
- Length: 0.4 mi (640 m) (unofficial)
- Existed: 1953–ca. 1979 (demolished)

Major junctions
- West end: CR 508 in Newark
- East end: Second Street in Harrison

Location
- Country: United States
- State: New Jersey
- Counties: Essex, Hudson

Highway system
- New Jersey State Highway Routes; Interstate; US; State; Scenic Byways
← Route 157	→ Route 159

Route 158 (also known as the Centre Street Bridge) was a short state highway in Newark and Harrison, New Jersey, in the counties of Essex and Hudson, which are located in the United States. The Centre Street Bridge was first constructed in 1834 as a single-level railroad bridge. However, in 1911, almost eight decades later, a second, upper level was constructed for rapid transit. In 1937, the Hudson and Manhattan Railroad, now part of the Port Authority Trans-Hudson line, was realigned onto railroad tracks along New Jersey Route 21. The upper level of the bridge was abandoned for this purpose, and was later converted to roadway. At the western end in Newark it ran just south of Park Place, beginning at Center Street. The route headed eastward, crossing over Route 21 and the Passaic River before entering Harrison, where it terminated at Second Street north of New Jersey Railroad Avenue.

Eventually, the upper level roadway was designated by the New Jersey State Highway Department as Route 25AD. A spur of the recently designated State Highway Route 25A, the highway department made the roadway a suffixed spur of the highway because of the close proximity. Route 25A later became New Jersey Route 58 and is now an alignment of Interstate 280. The designation remained intact until the 1953 New Jersey state highway renumbering on January 1, 1953, when it was changed to New Jersey Route 158. Route 158 appeared on the state map for New Jersey until up to 1960, when it disappeared from the maps as a public highway. After 1960, Route 158 did not appear on maps, and the bridge was torn down around 1979.

== Route description ==
Route 158 began at an intersection with Park Place and Center Street (County Route 508) in the city of Newark. The route went up in elevation, paralleling Park Place until crossing New Jersey Route 21 (the McCarter Highway). The highway continued eastward, crossing the last patch of land between 21 and the river before heading onto the swing bridge. Route 158 crossed as a two-lane bridge into Harrison. The route continued onto land just north of New Jersey Railroad Avenue, where it turned northward along First Street. Route 158 turned eastward onto Essex Street, with the right-of-way ending at Second Street, where the designation ended as well.

== History ==
=== Railroad bridge ===
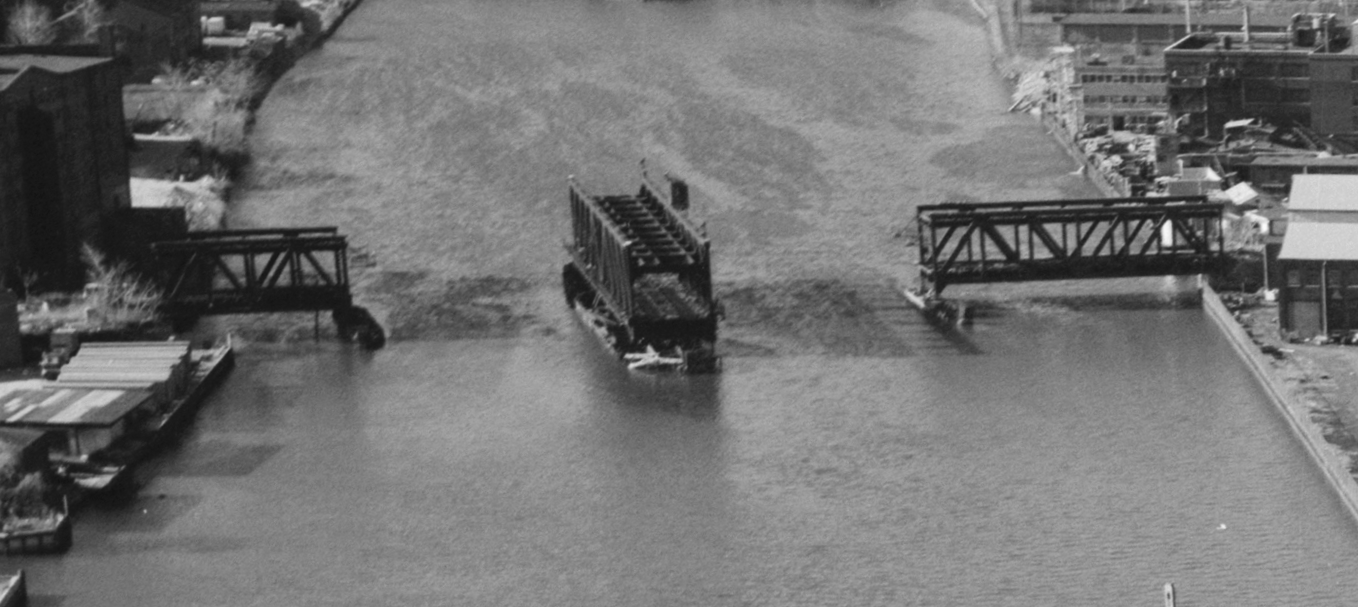
Aerial photo of bridge c. 1974 following the removal of the roadway

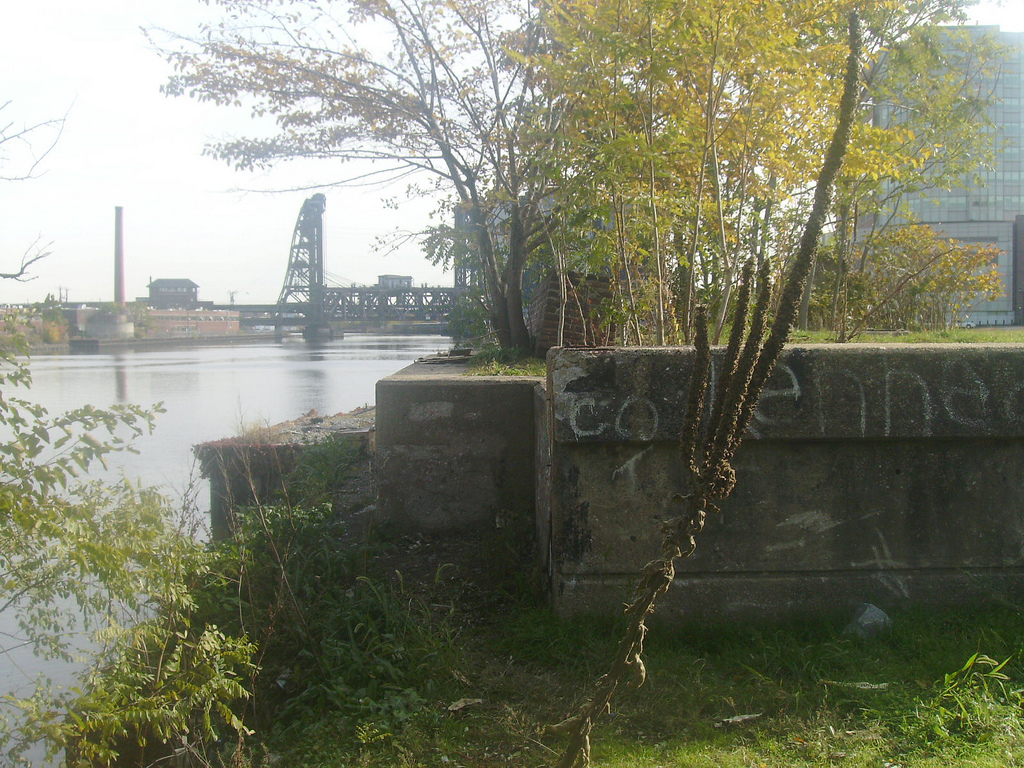
Close-up of the abutments of the Centre Street Bridge in Newark

The lower level of the Centre Street Bridge, a continuation of Centre Street in Newark, was first constructed for the New Jersey Railroad, which later became part of the Pennsylvania Railroad. On September 15, 1834, the bridge opened on a single level for trains. A cutoff around the bridge opened in 1870 and the old route became the Centre Street Branch of the New Jersey Railroad, being cut from the main line to the south when the latter was elevated around 1904. On March 1, 1901, a Pennsylvania Railroad train derailed its rear cars on the bridge at 10:23 that evening. When it derailed, the rear cars were dragged for 100 yards across the trestle. The train, a locomotive and five cars, had just left the Centre Street station when it derailed. The bridge had no guard rails at the time, and the rails hung over the bridge. The cars were disconnected, and the passengers continued to Jersey City. The reason for the cars jumping the rails was not known.

In July 1901, the states of New Jersey and New York proposed improvements to several local bridges to the United States Congress. The proposal asked for $45,000 (1901 USD) in improvements of dredging and maintaining the channel of the Passaic River below the bridge. Ten workers, known as sandhogs died during a construction accident. On April 2, 1911, almost ten years after the proposed improvements, construction began on a new high-speed line in Newark along the Hudson and Manhattan Railroad. It was proposed to be completed by the end of the summer in that year, to help commuters to New York City. The same proposal asked for authorization of a proposal for subways in the city by the state of New Jersey. The bridge at the time was made of steel with concrete flooring and pavement. The upper-level was to have a clearance of 18 feet (5.5 m) and there was to be a 230 feet (70 m) long drawbridge in the center. The upper level was to be used by the new passenger line and the lower level was to be used for the freight line of the Pennsylvania Railroad.

The new high-speed line and double-decker Centre Street Bridge was completed on November 18, 1911. The last rail that had to be constructed was completed that very day for the eighty-six Newark-bound trains to run in each direction of that line. The drawbridge's only use was for the freight line that was to go along the lower level of the bridge. As proposed, the upper level was given to the line. On November 25, 1911, the bridge re-opened once again as a double level bridge. connecting to the H&M to Park Place.

Route 25AD (1930s-1953)

On June 27, 1937, a proposal was made by the city of Newark and the counties of Hudson and Essex to convert the upper level of the span to a roadway after proposing that the Hudson and Manhattan Railroad, now the Port Authority Trans-Hudson, to be moved onto tracks that paralleled Route 21, which was assigned in 1927.

=== Road bridge ===
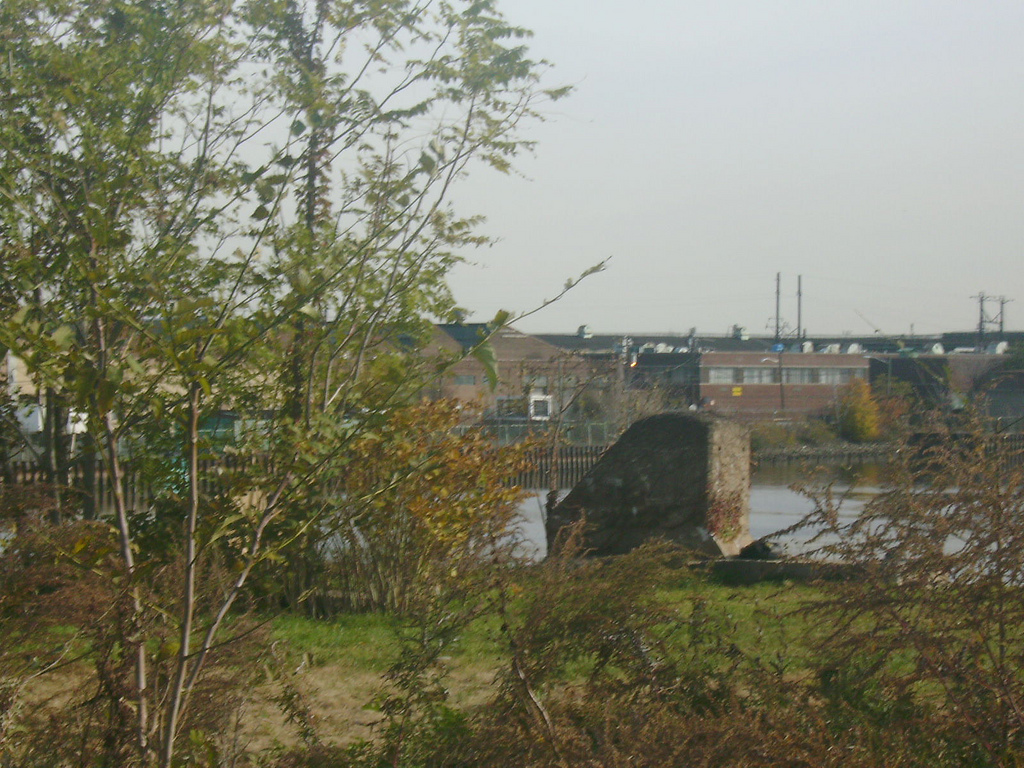
Remains of Route 158 from the Newark side

The Centre Street Bridge was later designated as a state highway under the public highway system. The New Jersey State Highway Department had recently designated Route 25A, which became Route 58, and later Interstate 280 to the south in the proximity of the bridge. The state highway department a few years later designated the alignment of the upper level span of the bridge as New Jersey State Highway Route 25A-D, which was a suffixed spur of Route 25A. Even with the designation, State Highway Route 25A-D did not connect to its parent or grandparent routes. However, unlike Route 25A, Route 25A-D did not appear in the state laws. The route remained intact along the bridge from Route 21 and Center Street in Newark to Second Street in Harrison until January 1, 1953, when the state highway department completed a second renumbering of state highways in New Jersey. Route 158 appeared in maps along the Centre Street Bridge as a publicly used highway until 1960, when it disappeared from the maps. Route 158's official decommissioning date is currently unknown, but the Centre Street Bridge was torn down around 1979.

== Major intersections ==
County	Location	mi	km	Destinations	Notes
Essex	Newark	0.0	0.0	CR 508 (Centre Street)	Western terminus
Hudson	Harrison	0.4	0.64	Second Street	Eastern terminus
1.000 mi = 1.609 km; 1.000 km = 0.621 mi

== See also ==
- List of crossings of the Lower Passaic River
