= Passaic River Parkway =

Coordinates: 40°41′43″N 74°24′04″W

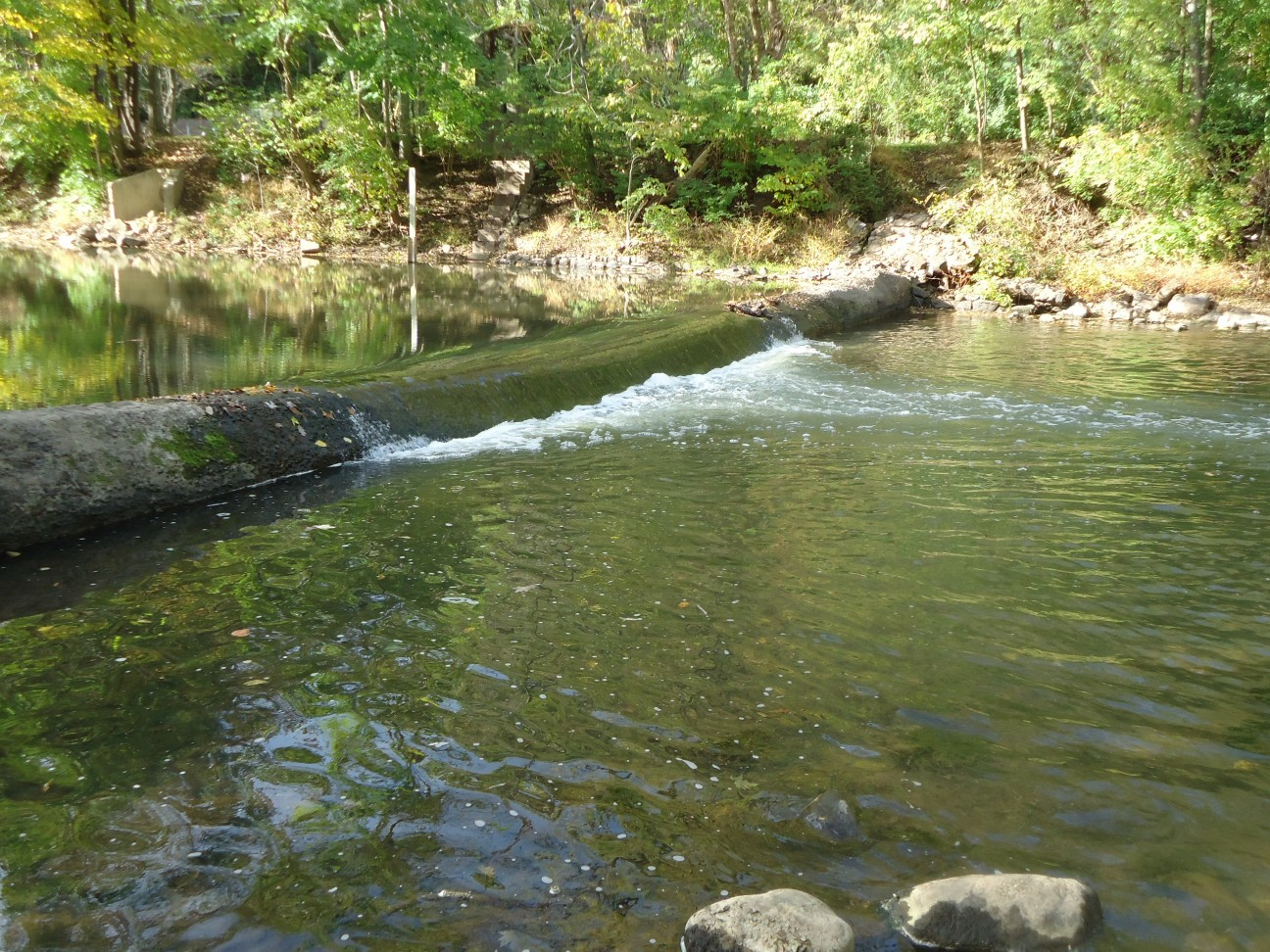
A spillway dam in Summit

Passaic River Parkway, often called Passaic River Park, is a linear park along the banks of the Passaic River in Union County, New Jersey. It is one of the three "emerald necklaces" in the Union County Park System, the others being Rahway River Parkway and Elizabeth River Parkway.

The parkland comprises 298 non-contiguous acres along the river (travelling downstream) in Berkeley Heights, New Providence, and Summit. Plans for a park were conceived as early as 1909. The Parkway was conceived in the 1920s when the county park system was being developed, following the design of the Olmsted Brothers, sons of landscape architect Frederick Law Olmsted. Much of the land along the Passaic was acquired in the 1960s.

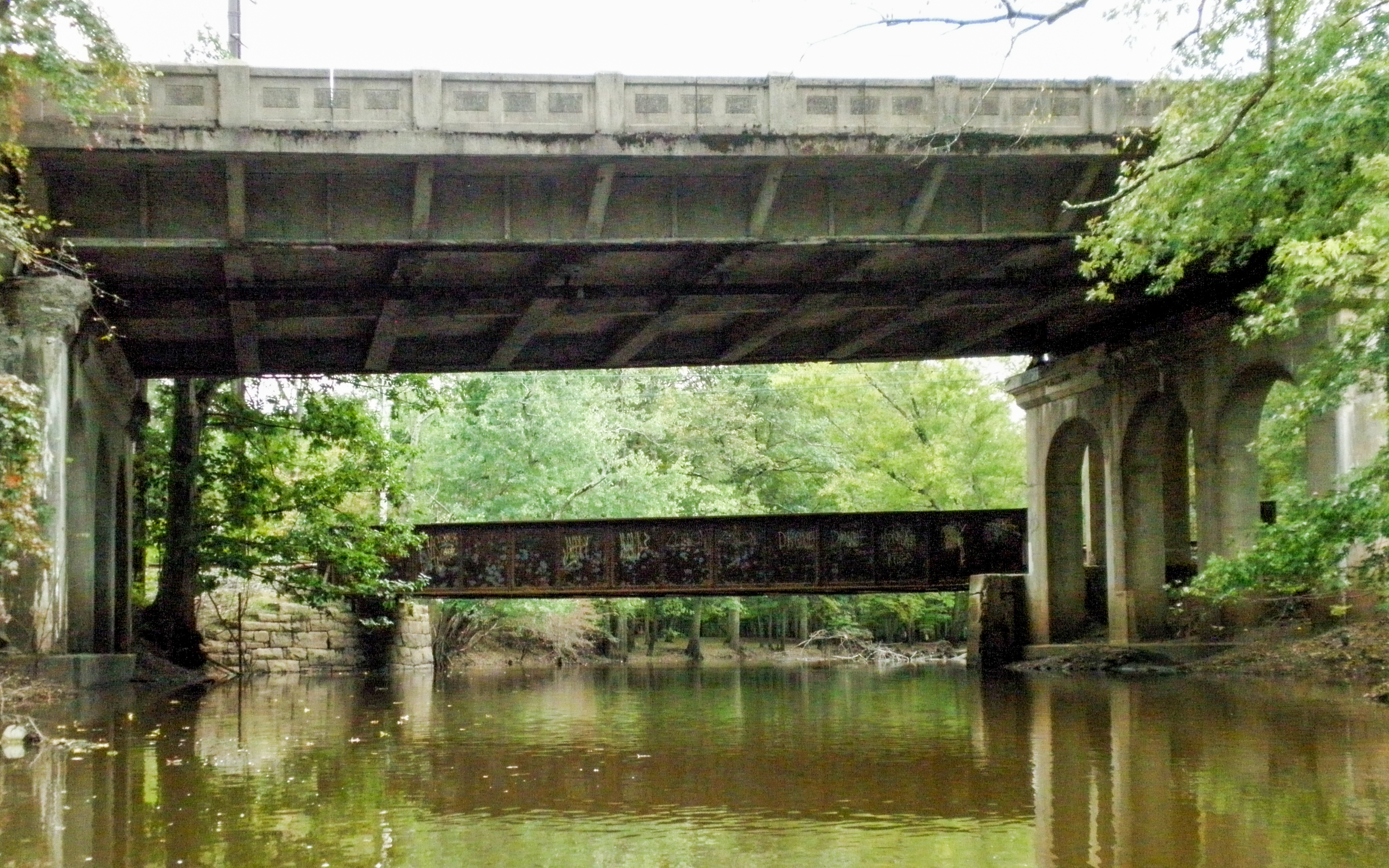
Springfield Avenue and NJ Transit Gladstone Branch crossing the Passaic in Berkeley Heights

The Passaic River Parkway lies in the valley of the Passaic River (the drainage basin of Second Watchung Mountain) in northwestern Union County, where the river creates the borders with Somerset and Morris Counties. There are also parks and nature areas in the riparian floodplain across the river in Watchung, Warren Township, Long Hill Township and Chatham. The Great Swamp National Wildlife Refuge is just west of the river.

Many of the crossings of the river in the park are late 19th century or early 20th century bridges.

== See also ==
- Murray Hill, New Jersey
- List of crossings of the Upper Passaic River
- Watchung Reservation
- Washington–Rochambeau Revolutionary Route
- Emerald Necklace
