= Morris Goodkind =

Morris Goodkind (1888 – September 5, 1968) was chief bridge engineer for the New Jersey State Highway Department from 1925 to 1955 (now New Jersey Department of Transportation), and was responsible for the construction of numerous bridges during that period. Goodkind emphasized the integration of architecture and aesthetics in bridge design and received awards from the American Society of Civil Engineers and the American Institute of Steel Construction for his designs.

Goodkind was a graduate of Columbia University. He worked for the New York City Public Service Commission in the development of the subway system before working on bridge designs for engineering firms and Mercer County, New Jersey. He joined the New Jersey Highway Department in 1922, and was its Chief Bridge Engineer from 1925–1955, after which he retired to private practice.

Morris Goodkind designed the northbound span of the bridge that crosses the Raritan River at Route 1, completed in 1929, and now known as the Morris Goodkind Memorial Bridge. His son Donald Goodkind (1922–2013) was an architect and engineer who became assistant commissioner for highways of the New Jersey Department of Transportation. Donald Goodkind designed the southbound span of the bridge that crosses the Raritan River at Route 1, built in 1974, and now known as the Donald Goodkind Bridge.

== Works associated with Goodkind ==
- Pulaski Skyway
- Donald and Morris Goodkind Bridges
- Edison Bridge (New Jersey)
- Lincoln Highway Passaic River Bridge
- Basilone Memorial Bridge
- Bridges along the Burma Road
- Bridges along the Garden State Parkway
- Shark River Bridge
- Cheesequake Creek Bridge
- Absecon Boulevard Bridge
- Perth Amboy Bypass – NJ Route 35 Extension
- Route 46 Hackensack River Bridge
- Route 46 Passaic River Bridge

== See also ==
- Gilmore David Clarke
- William A. Stickel
- List of crossings of the Hackensack River
- List of crossings of the Lower Passaic River
- List of crossings of the Upper Passaic River
- List of crossings of the Raritan River
- List of bridges, tunnels, and cuts in Hudson County, New Jersey
- List of bridges documented by the Historic American Engineering Record in New Jersey
- List of bridges on the National Register of Historic Places in New Jersey
