= Hillery Street Bridge =

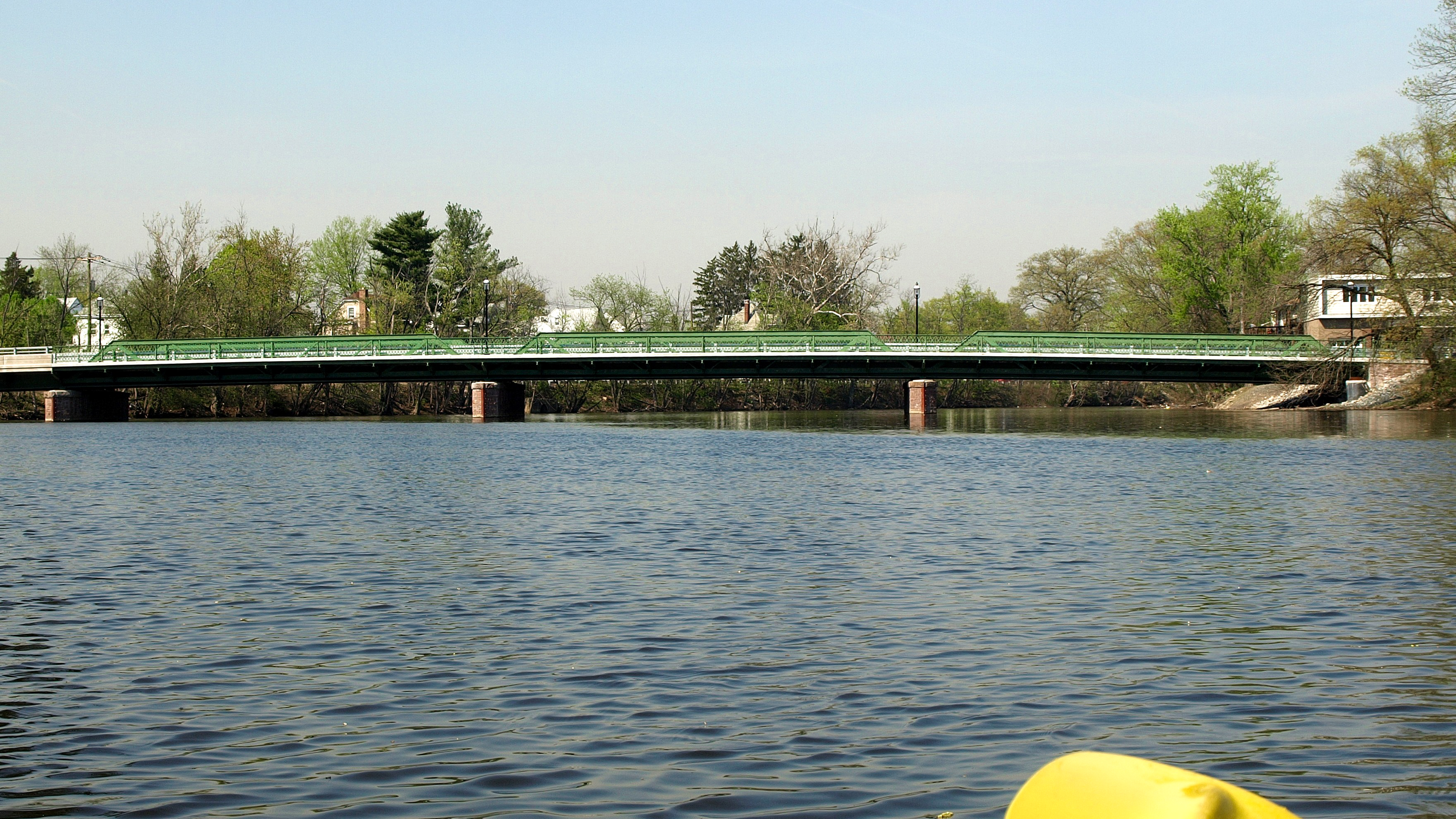
- Coordinates: 40°54′15″N 74°12′02″W
- Carries: CR 644
- Crosses: Passaic River
- Locale: Totowa and Woodland Park; New Jersey
- Owner: Passaic County
- Maintained by: County
- ID number: 1600039

Characteristics
- Material: Steel/concrete
- Total length: 353 feet (108 m)
- Width: 32.8 feet (10.0 m)
- Longest span: 87.9 feet (26.8 m)
- No. of spans: 4

History
- Construction end: 1898; 1973 rehab 2009 refurbish

The Hillery Street Bridge is a vehicular bridge over the Passaic River in Totowa and Woodland Park, New Jersey. The Pratt pony truss carries Hillery Street and Totowa Road and is designated County Route 644. It was originally built in 1898 and rehabilitated in 1973. It was extensively refurbished in 2009 to its original historic state, including its original lattice-work sidewalk railings. A historic bridge survey conducted by the New Jersey Department of Transportation from 1991–1994 determined that the bridge was eligible for listing on the New Jersey Register of Historic Places and the National Register of Historic Places.

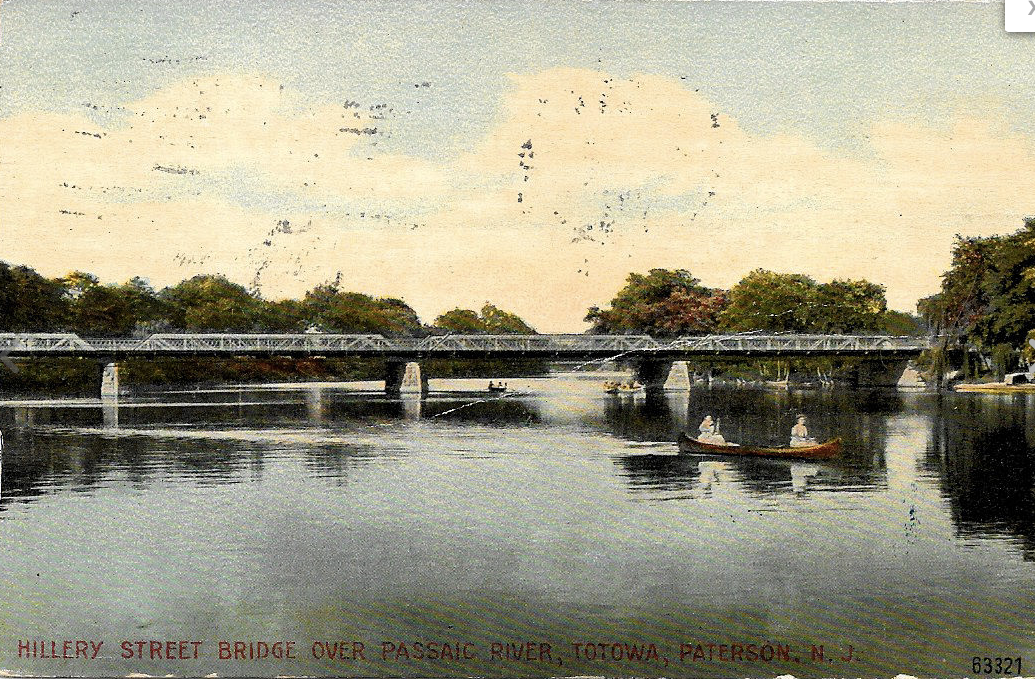
1898 postcard view

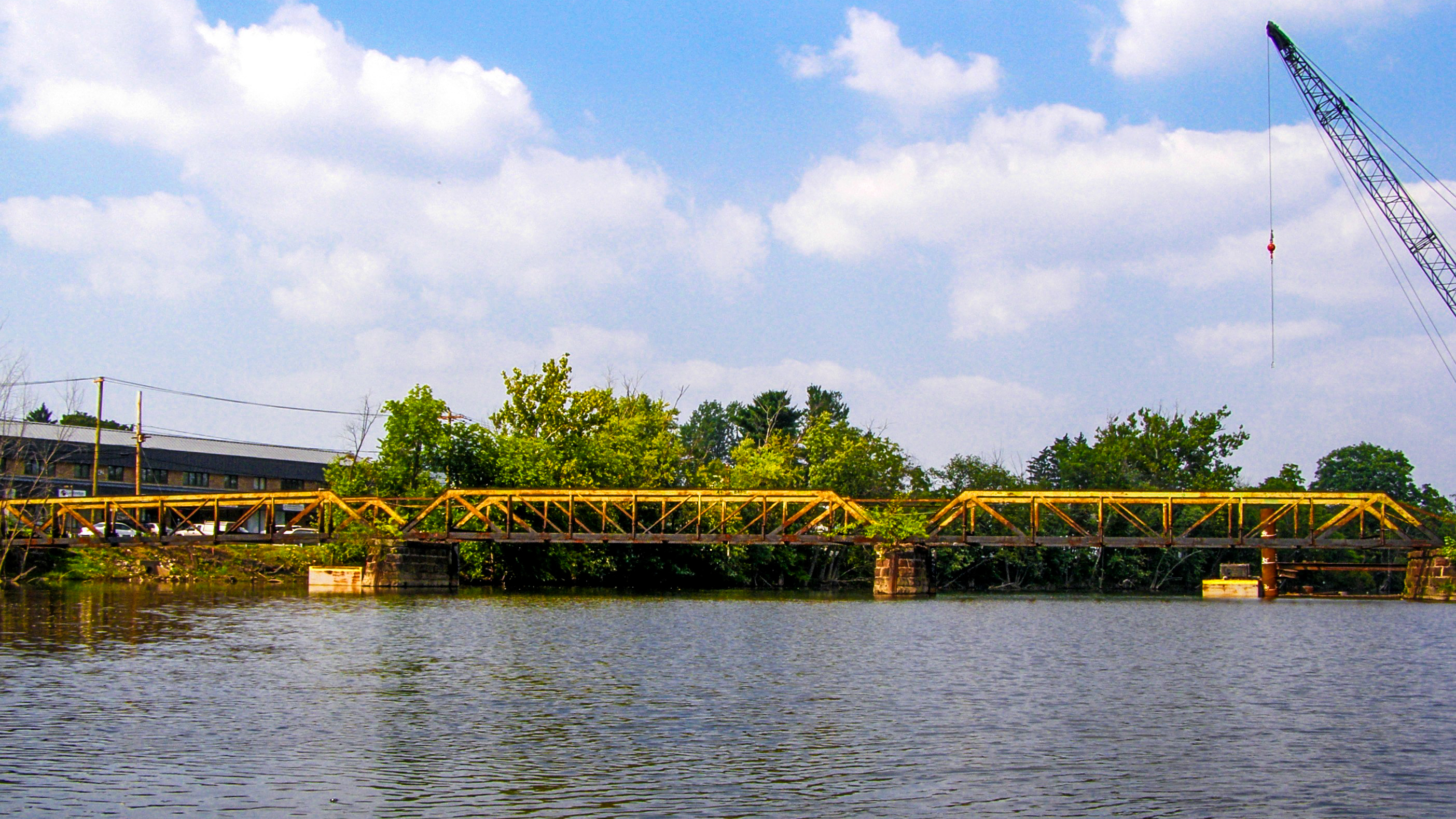
1973

== See also ==
- List of crossings of the Upper Passaic River
- List of crossings of the Lower Passaic River
- List of county routes in Passaic County, New Jersey
