= William A. Stickel Memorial Bridge =

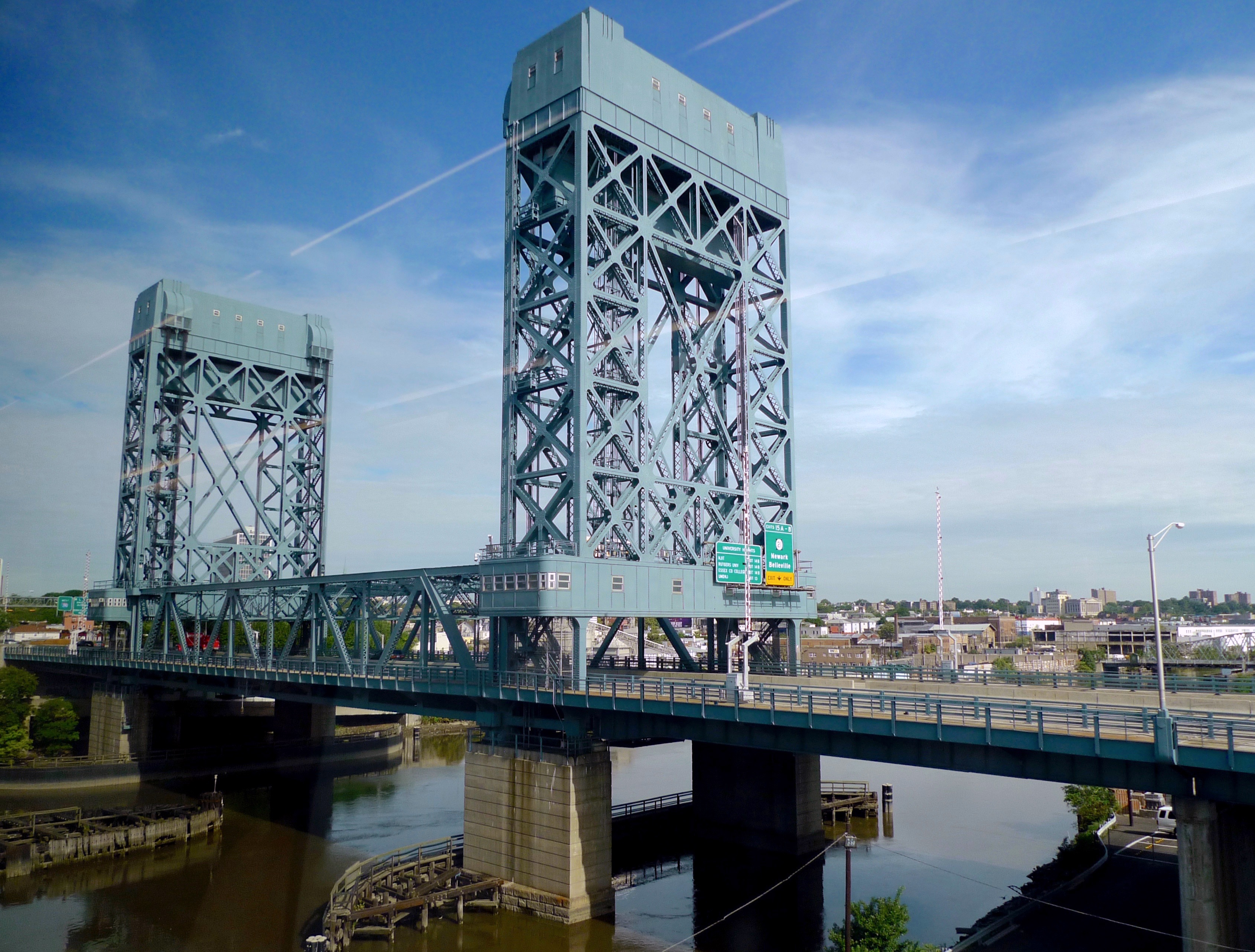
- Coordinates: 40°44′53″N 74°09′58″W
- Carries: 6 lanes of I-280
- Crosses: Passaic River
- Locale: Newark and East Newark, New Jersey
- Owner: New Jersey Department of Transportation
- ID number: 0731161

Characteristics
- Design: Vertical-lift truss bridge
- Material: Steel
- Total length: 687.6 feet (209.6 meters)

History
- Inaugurated: May 1, 1949

Statistics
- Daily traffic: 120,000

The William A. Stickel Memorial Bridge is a vertical-lift bridge in New Jersey that crosses the Passaic River, connecting Newark and East Newark as part of Interstate 280. The bridge is named in honor of William A. Stickel, a civil engineer from Newark who served as the Essex County engineer for over 20 years.

The bridge was constructed from 1948 to 1949 as Route 25A and is owned and operated by the New Jersey Department of Transportation. The total length of the structure is 209.6 metres (688 ft), and it provides a clearance of 11.7–15.1 metres (38–50 ft). The length of the movable section is 41.9 metres (137 ft). The bridge was inaugurated on May 1, 1949, and became part of the interstate system in 1971.

The bridge is one of the few movable bridges that remain in the Interstate Highway System. The bridge remained operated by a drawtender until March 3, 1999. It rarely opens and requires 24-hour notice to NJDOT for opening. The six-lane Stickel Bridge has four through-traffic lanes and two lanes for traffic entering and exiting Route 21 at exit 15 just west of the bridge.

== Rehabilitation ==
The April 2001 release of a New Jersey Department of Transportation report labeling the Stickel Bridge "structurally deficient and functionally obsolete" has prompted officials to consider options to either rehabilitate or replace the bridge. Inspectors found both the superstructure and substructure of the old span to be in "poor" condition, the result of wall cracks and severe corrosion of structural steel. Furthermore, the steel-grated roadway, narrow lanes and tight ramps leading to the local streets have contributed to the bridge's high accident rate.

In May 2008, the rehabilitation work on the span was completed. Work included having its mechanical systems overhauled, and removal of its old black coating, in favor of a light blue paint.

== Pedestrian Access ==
Built prior to the conception of the Interstate Highway System, the bridge initially provided pedestrian access between the McCarter Highway (SR 21) in Newark and Hamilton Street in Harrison. A 2016 project to improve safety at the I-280/Route 21 interchange resulted in the permanent closure of the pedestrian access to the bridge, in accordance with the prohibition of pedestrian access to interstate highways. The stairways up to the bridge and the sidewalks along the bridge are still extant but are gated off, and guardrail reconfiguration on the exit ramps additionally limits access.

== See also ==
- List of crossings of the Lower Passaic River
