= William A. Stickel =

American bridge engineer

William A. Stickel (1893–1944) was a bridge engineer for the Essex County, New Jersey, and the New Jersey State Highway Department (now New Jersey Department of Transportation) who was associated with the construction of numerous bridges throughout the state built in the early part of the 20th century. The William A. Stickel Memorial Bridge is named in his honor.

== See also ==
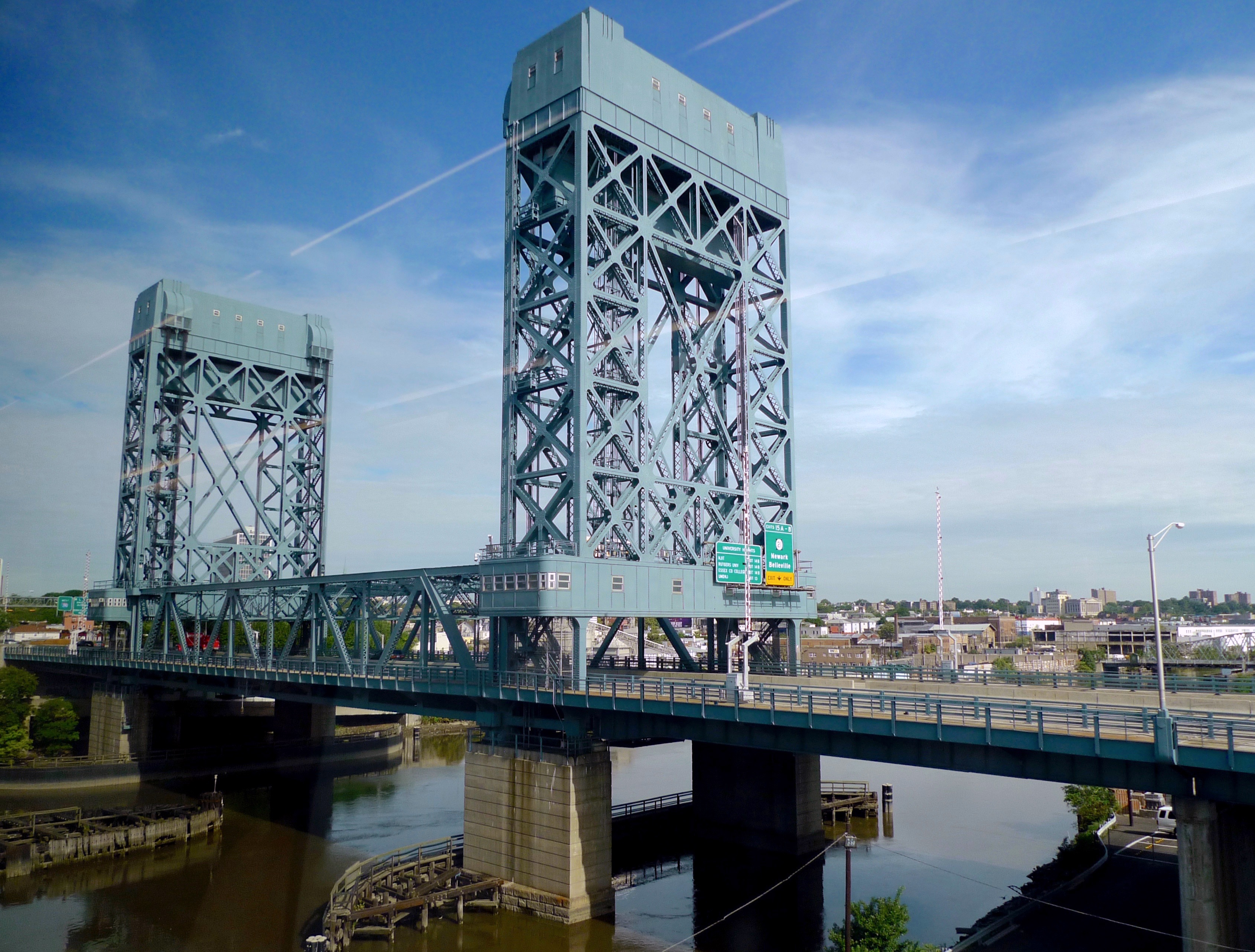
The William A. Stickel Memorial Bridge

- Morris Goodkind
- Gilmore David Clarke
- List of crossings of the Hackensack River
- List of crossings of the Lower Passaic River
- List of crossings of the Upper Passaic River
- List of crossings of the Raritan River
- List of bridges, tunnels, and cuts in Hudson County, New Jersey
- List of bridges documented by the Historic American Engineering Record in New Jersey
- List of bridges on the National Register of Historic Places in New Jersey
