= Twin bridges =

Set of two bridges running parallel to each other

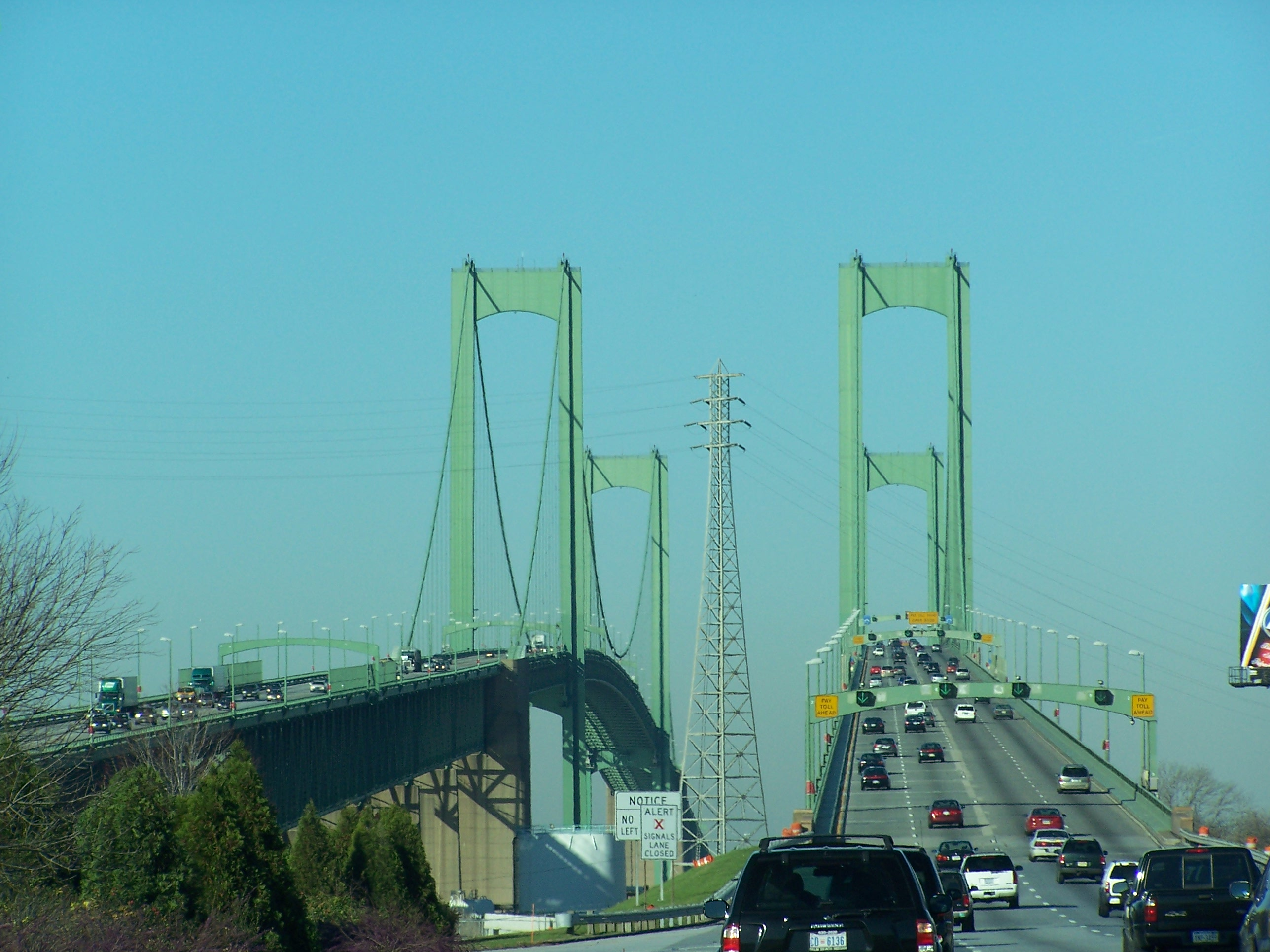
The Delaware Memorial Bridge twin-span suspension bridge

Twin bridges are a set of two bridges running parallel to each other. A pair of twin bridges is often referred to collectively as a twin-span or dual-span bridge. Twin bridges are independent structures and each bridge has its own superstructure, substructure, and foundation. Bridges of this type are often created by building a new bridge parallel to an existing one in order to increase the traffic capacity of the crossing.

Twin-span bridges may or may not have been constructed at the same time, and may not be identical or even the same type of bridge. Many but not all twin bridges carry one-way pairs of traffic.

For a bridge owner, twin bridges can improve the maintenance and management of the structures. For motorists, twin bridges can limit the risk that both directions of traffic will be disrupted by an accident.

== Visually similar bridges ==
This section includes bridges that have the same overall visual appearance, but may still have minor differences. For example, the 1951 span of the Delaware Memorial Bridge is riveted, while the 1968 span is welded.

| Bridge | First span | Second span | Notes |
|---|---|---|---|
| Bi-State Vietnam Gold Star Bridges | 1932 cantilever span | 1965 cantilever span | |
| Blanchette Memorial Bridge | 2013 cantilever span | 1979 cantilever span | 2013 span replaces the original built in 1959 |
| Buck O'Neil Bridge | 2024 beam spans | | |
| Chaplain Washington and Harry Laderman Bridges | 1952 causeway | 1970 causeway | Not a one-way pair; each bridge carries bidirectional traffic for one of the two spurs of the New Jersey Turnpike |
| Crescent City Connection | 1958 cantilever span | 1988 cantilever span | |
| Delaware Memorial Bridge | 1951 suspension span | 1968 suspension span | |
| Fairfax and Platte Purchase Bridges | 1934 continuous truss span | 1957 continuous truss span | Both demolished and replaced with U.S. Route 69 Missouri River Bridge |
| Interstate 65 Tennessee River Bridge | 1973 plate girder bridge | 1973 plate girder bridge | |
| Iron Cove Bridge | 1955 steel truss bridge | 2011 box girder span | |
| Kosciuszko Bridge | 2017 cable-stayed span | 2019 cable-stayed span | |
| Lake Pontchartrain Causeway | 1956 causeway | 1969 causeway | |
| Liberty Bend Bridge | 1949 continuous truss span | 2001 continuous truss span | |
| Maria Skłodowska-Curie Bridge | Three 2012 beam spans | | |
| Navajo Bridge | 1929 arch span | 1995 arch span | |
| Newburgh–Beacon Bridge | 1963 continuous truss span | 1980 continuous truss span | |
| Tappan Zee Bridge | 2017 cable-stayed spans | | |
| Thaddeus Kosciusko Bridge | 1961 through-arch spans | | Carries the Adirondack Northway between Latham, New York and Halfmoon, New York. |
| Sir Leo Hielscher Bridges | 1986 cantilever box girder span | 2010 cantilever box girder span | |
| South Grand Island Bridge | 1935 truss-arch span | 1962 truss-arch span | |

== Visually dissimilar but same type ==
| Bridge | First span | Second span | Notes |
|---|---|---|---|
| Chesapeake Bay Bridge | 1952 suspension and cantilever spans | 1973 suspension and cantilever spans | |
| Crimean Bridge | 2018 road bridge | 2020 rail bridge | Main span of road bridge destroyed in 2026 attack |
| Tacoma Narrows Bridge | 1950 suspension span | 2007 suspension span | 1950 span replaced a collapsed 1940 span |

== Different types ==
| Bridge | First span | Second span | Notes |
|---|---|---|---|
| Blue Water Bridge | 1938 cantilever span | 1997 tied arch span | |
| Carquinez Bridge | 1958 cantilever span | 2003 suspension span | 2003 span replaced a 1927 cantilever span |
| Donald and Morris Goodkind Bridges | 1929 Art Deco arch span | 1976 steel bridge | |
| 14th Street bridges | Five spans, see article | | |
| John F. Kennedy Memorial Bridge and Abraham Lincoln Bridge | 1963 cantilever span | 2015 cable-stayed span | |
| Québec Bridge and Pierre Laporte Bridge | 1919 cantilever span | 1970 suspension span | Not a one-way pair |
