= Great Piece Meadows =

Coordinates: 40.89665°N 74.31393°W

Great Piece Meadows is a 7,100-acre (29 km^{2}) fresh water swamp located in the towns of Lincoln Park, Montville, and Fairfield in New Jersey. The wooded swamp is mostly inside the bow of the Passaic River which floods during the year from heavy rain or heavy snow melt.

The meadows are part of the Northeastern coastal forests ecoregion.

== See also ==
- Great Swamp National Wildlife Refuge
