= Lincoln Highway Passaic River Bridge =

Lincoln Highway Bridge
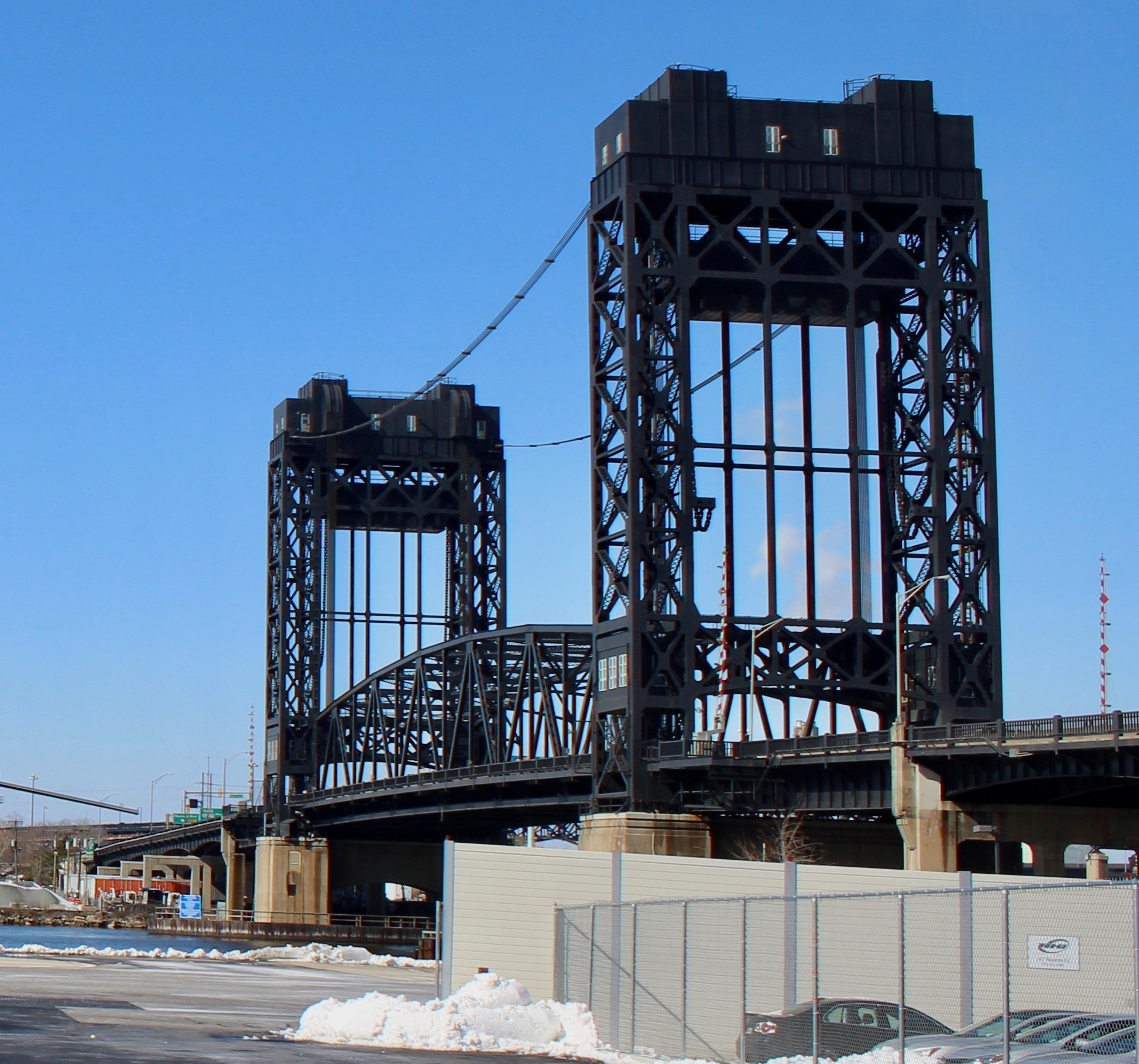
- The bridge in 2018
- Coordinates: 40.7324°N 74.1180°W
- Carries: US 1/9 Truck; East Coast Greenway
- Crosses: Passaic River
- Locale: Newark and Kearny
- Other name(s): Route 1&9 Lincoln Highway Bridge; Rte 1&9 Passaic River Bridge
- Owner: New Jersey Department of Transportation
- ID number: 0705151

Characteristics
- Design: Vertical lift
- Material: Steel
- Total length: 2,005 feet (611 m)
- Width: 52 feet (16 m)
- Longest span: 322.5 feet (98.3 m)
- No. of spans: 18
- Clearance above: 15.9 feet (4.8 m)
- Clearance below: 35 feet (11 m) (mean high water); 40 feet (12 m) (mean low water); 140 feet (43 m) (open position)

History
- Designer: Ash, Howard, Needles, and Tamman & Morris Goodkind
- Engineering design by: Feidinan'd Coyne
- Construction start: 1939
- Construction end: 1940
- Construction cost: $2,500,000
- Opened: 1941

Location
- Interactive map of Lincoln Highway Bridge

The Lincoln Highway Passaic River Bridge is a vehicular moveable bridge crossing the Passaic River at a point 1.8 mi (2.9 km) from the river mouth at Newark Bay in northeastern New Jersey, United States. The vertical lift bridge, along the route of the Lincoln Highway, carries U.S. Route 1/9 Truck (at milepoint 0.67) and the East Coast Greenway between the Ironbound section of Newark and Kearny Point in Kearny. Opened in 1941, it is owned by and operated by the New Jersey Department of Transportation (NJDOT) and required by the Code of Federal Regulations to open on 4-hour notice for maritime traffic.

== Location ==
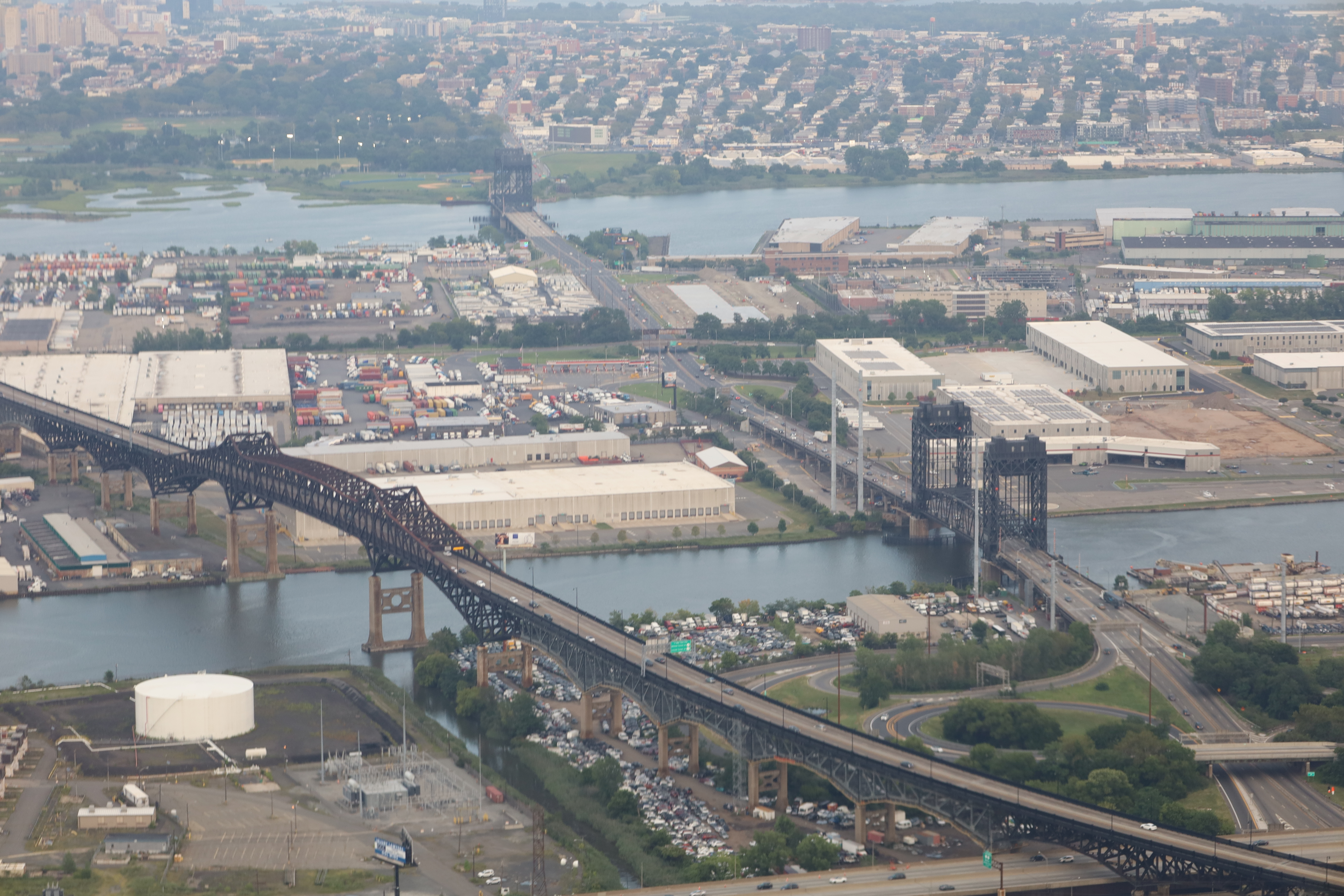
Aerial view of the Pulaski Skyway (left) and Lincoln Highway Bridge (right) crossing the Passaic River in 2023

The Lincoln Highway Bridge crosses the Passaic in the vicinity of Kearny Point Reach following the route that was once Newark Plank Road. The east bank at Kearny Point is an industrial and distribution warehouse area. During the first half of the 20th century it was a site of yards of the Federal Shipbuilding and Drydock Company. At its western end there are connections to Raymond Boulevard, US Route 1/9, and the New Jersey Turnpike.

The bridge and its sister, the Lincoln Highway Hackensack River Bridge are important components in the transportation of goods in the Port of New York and New Jersey. Since the nearby Pulaski Skyway prohibits trucks they often use Route 1/9 Truck to serve traffic at Port Newark, Newark Airport, the Holland Tunnel and the numerous intermodal freight transport facilities in the New Jersey Meadowlands. The NJDOT is considering building a new bridge along the alignment of the now defunct PD Draw, the former Newark and New York Branch bridge at mile point 1.2. Studies are being conducted as part of an extensive project conceived to facilitate freight transshipment through the port known as Portway. A new bridge could include a rail component. The dual bridge combination would allow for two one-way crossings of the Passaic.

== History ==
Approval for the bridge was given by the War Department in 1937. Construction began in 1939 and it was opened in January 1941. It was designed by the firm of Ash, Howard, Needles, and Tamman in conjunction with Morris Goodkind of the New Jersey Highway Department to incorporate many innovative concepts of the era.

== See also ==
- List of crossings of the Lower Passaic River
- List of crossings of the Hackensack River
- List of bridges, tunnels, and cuts in Hudson County, New Jersey
- Lincoln Highway Hackensack River Bridge
- HNTB
- Waddell & Harrington
