= Wiman (surname) =

Wiman is a surname. Notable people with the surname include:

- Al Wiman, American reporter
- Anders Wiman (1865–1959), Swedish mathematician
- Carl Wiman (1867–1944), Swedish paleontologist
- David Wiman (1884–1950), Swedish gymnast
- Dwight Deere Wiman (1895–1951), American film actor, playwright, director and Broadway producer
- Erastus Wiman (1834–1904), Canadian journalist and businessman
- Joni Wiman (born 1993), Finnish rallycross driver
- Kenneth G. Wiman (1930–2021), United States Coast Guard rear admiral
- Matt Wiman (born 1983), American mixed martial arts fighter
