= George Glasgow =

American basketball player

Personal information
- Born: September 26, 1931 Kearny, New Jersey, U.S.
- Died: October 28, 2013 (aged 82) Yardley, Pennsylvania, U.S.
- Listed height: 6 ft 2 in (1.88 m)

Career information
- High school: Kearny (Kearny, New Jersey)
- College: Fairleigh Dickinson (1950–1953)
- NBA draft: 1953: 2nd round, 10th overall pick
- Drafted by: Fort Wayne Pistons
- Position: Guard
- Stats at Basketball Reference

George Glasgow
Managerial career
- Years: Team
- 1956–1969; 1974–1976: Fairleigh Dickinson

George Glasgow (September 26, 1931 – October 28, 2013) was an American basketball player and soccer coach. He served as the head coach of the Fairleigh Dickinson Knights men's soccer team from 1956 to 1969 and 1974 to 1976.

Raised in Kearny, New Jersey, Glasgow graduated from Kearny High School in 1949.

Glasgow played college basketball for the Fairleigh Dickinson Knights from 1950 to 1953 and became the program's first player to score 1,000 career points. He was selected by the Fort Wayne Pistons as the 10th overall pick of the 1953 NBA draft but he never played in the National Basketball Association (NBA) as he instead served in the United States Army during the Korean War. He returned to Fairleigh Dickinson University to earn his bachelor's degree and attended Columbia University for his master's degree. In 1956, Glasgow was hired as head coach of the Fairleigh Dickinson Knights men's soccer team. During his two stints with the Knights, he guided the team to eight post-season tournaments: a National Association of Intercollegiate Athletics (NAIA) tournament appearance in 1958 followed by seven NCAA tournament berths. He amassed a 130–51–17 record over 17 seasons.

Glasgow was an inaugural member of Fairleigh Dickinson University's Athletics Hall of Fame in 1999.
