= Gamero =

Gamero is a surname. Notable people with the surname include:

- Alberto Gamero (born 1964), Colombian football manager and former player
- Benjamín Muñoz Gamero (1817–1851), Chilean naval officer and politician
- Franco Gamero (born 1990), Puerto Rican footballer
- Isabel Bayón Gamero (born 1969), Spanish flamenco dancer, choreographer and teacher of flamenco dance
- José Ramírez Gamero, Mexican politician
- Lucila Gamero de Medina (1873–1964), Honduran romantic novelist
- Manuel de Adalid y Gamero (1872–1947), Honduran composer
- Pedro Gamero del Castillo (1910–1984), Spanish politician
