= Kearny School District =

School district in Hudson County, New Jersey, US

Address
- 100 Davis Avenue Kearny, Hudson County, New Jersey, 07032; United States
- Coordinates: 40.756695°N 74.148102°W

District information
- Grades: PreK-12
- Superintendent: Flora Encarnacao
- Business administrator: Juan Faciolince
- Schools: 7

Students and staff
- Enrollment: 5,142 (as of 2021–22)
- Faculty: 455.7 FTEs
- Student–teacher ratio: 11.3:1

Other information
- District Factor Group: B
- Website: www.kearnyschools.com
Ind.	Per pupil	District spending	Rank (*)	K-12 average	%± vs. average
1A	Total Spending	$14,854	3	$18,891	−21.4%
1	Budgetary Cost	12,532	13	14,783	−15.2%
2	Classroom Instruction	7,892	17	8,763	−9.9%
6	Support Services	1,136	1	2,392	−52.5%
8	Administrative Cost	1,725	90	1,485	16.2%
10	Operations & Maintenance	1,512	37	1,783	−15.2%
13	Extracurricular Activities	193	28	268	−28.0%
16	Median Teacher Salary	68,383	73	64,043
Data from NJDoE 2014 Taxpayers' Guide to Education Spending. *Of K-12 districts with more than 3,500 students. Lowest spending=1; Highest=103

The Kearny School District is a public school district that provides public education for students in pre-kindergarten through twelfth grade from the Town of Kearny, in Hudson County, in the U.S. state of New Jersey.

As of the 2021–22 school year, the district, comprising seven schools, had an enrollment of 5,142 students and 455.7 classroom teachers (on an FTE basis), for a student–teacher ratio of 11.3:1.

The district is classified by the New Jersey Department of Education as being in District Factor Group "B", the second lowest of eight groupings. District Factor Groups organize districts statewide to allow comparison by common socioeconomic characteristics of the local districts. From lowest socioeconomic status to highest, the categories are A, B, CD, DE, FG, GH, I and J.

== Schools ==
Schools in the district (with 2021–22 enrollment data from the National Center for Education Statistics) are:

Elementary schools

- Franklin Elementary School with 842 students in grades PreK-6
  - Yvonne Cali, principal
- Garfield Elementary School with 439 students in grades PreK-6
  - Donna Masters, principal
- Roosevelt Elementary School with 385 students in grades PreK-6
  - Antonio Moyano, principal
- Schuyler Elementary School with 410 students in grades PreK-6
  - Valerie Iacono, principal
- Washington Elementary School with 474 students in grades PreK-6
  - Jon Zimmerman, principal

Middle school

- Lincoln Middle School with 752 students in grades 7-8
  - James Hempel, principal

High school

- Kearny High School with 1,742 students in grades 9-12
  - Curtis Brack, principal

== Haiti relief effort ==
On January 22, 2010, the entire school district held a "dress-down day" to raise money to help the Haitian people after suffering from the 2010 Haiti earthquake. The students were allowed to wear whatever they wanted, and at their discrepancy, they could and were encouraged to donate to those in need in Haiti. The high school alone reported early on that they had raised over $6,500. Shortly after, it was posted on the district website that in total, all seven schools were able to raise $29,000. All funds were donated to the Clinton Bush Haiti Fund.

== Administration ==
Core members of the school administration are:

- Flora Encarnacao, superintendent of schools
- Juan Faciolince, business administrator and board secretary

== Board of education ==
The district's board of education, comprised of nine members, sets policy and oversees the fiscal and educational operation of the district through its administration. As a Type II school district, the board's trustees are elected directly by voters to serve three-year terms of office on a staggered basis, with three seats up for election each year held (since 2012) as part of the November general election. The board appoints a superintendent to oversee the district's day-to-day operations and a business administrator to supervise the business functions of the district.
