= Standard Tool & Manufacturing =

American tool manufacturer

Standard Tool & Manufacturing was a Swedish-American Tool and main supplier of electronics to the Radio Corporation of America (RCA) based in Kearny, New Jersey, United States.

Another company called Standard Tool & Mfg was founded in 1994.

== History ==
The company was founded in 1910 by Swedish emigrant Johannes Strandberg. In the early history of Standard Tools the company consisted of a small machine shop that made metal parts, machine tools and metalworking equipment. In 1926 Mr Bernard "Bearny" J. Keating took over as chairman and the company expanded. On March 13, 1945, Standard Tool and Manufacturing company received the Army-Navy E, Award of Excellence for Achievement in Production. In 1955 Standard Tools was cited by the RCA for "many outstanding contributions to R.C.A. and the electronics industry over the past twenty-five years". Mr Keating was named the outstanding Roman Catholic layman of the year by St. John's University, Brooklyn and received its St. Vincent de Paul Medal.
