= Kearny High School (New Jersey) =

High School in Hudson County, New Jersey, US

Location
- 336 Devon Street; Kearny, Hudson County, New Jersey 07032; United States; 40.761818°N 74.148097°W

Information
- Type: Public high school
- Established: 1923
- School district: Kearny School District
- NCES School ID: 340789002866
- Principal: Curtis Brack
- Faculty: 142.5 FTEs
- Grades: 9-12
- Enrollment: 1,825 (as of 2024–25)
- Student to teacher ratio: 12.8:1
- Colors: Red and Black
- Athletics conference: Hudson County Interscholastic League (general); North Jersey Super Football Conference (football)
- Team name: Kardinals
- Website: www.kearnyschools.com/o/khs

Kearny High School is a four-year comprehensive public high school serving students in ninth through twelfth grades from Kearny in Hudson County, in the U.S. state of New Jersey, and operating as the lone secondary school of the Kearny School District.

As of the 2024–25 school year, the school had an enrollment of 1,825 students and 142.5 classroom teachers (on an FTE basis), for a student–teacher ratio of 12.8:1. There were 1,118 students (61.3% of enrollment) eligible for free lunch and 167 (9.2% of students) eligible for reduced-cost lunch.

== History ==
Kearny's first high school was established in 1894. Construction began on the present school facility began in 1921 and Kearny High School opened for the fall semester in September 1923. The school's stadium was completed in 1925. In 1940, an addition costing $400,000 was added. In 1974, another addition was added that cost $5 million, providing a new Music and Art Department, new gymnasium, locker rooms, classrooms and parking. The school is divided into two different buildings that are connected to each other.

The Kearny Museum includes a full collection of Kearny High School yearbooks.

== Awards, recognition and rankings ==
The school was the 244th-ranked public high school in New Jersey out of 339 schools statewide in New Jersey Monthly magazine's September 2014 cover story on the state's "Top Public High Schools", using a new ranking methodology. The school had been ranked 224th in the state of 328 schools in 2012, after being ranked 230th in 2010 out of 322 schools listed. The magazine ranked the school 235th in 2008 out of 316 schools. The school was ranked 200th in the magazine's September 2006 issue, which surveyed 316 schools across the state.

Schooldigger.com ranked the school 246th out of 367 public high schools statewide in its 2009-10 rankings which were based on the combined percentage of students classified as proficient or above proficient on the language arts literacy and mathematics components of the High School Proficiency Assessment (HSPA).

== Extracurricular activities ==
=== Athletics ===
The Kearny High School Kardinals compete in the Hudson County Interscholastic Athletic Association, which is comprised of public and private high schools in Hudson County, operating under the jurisdiction of the New Jersey State Interscholastic Athletic Association (NJSIAA). Prior to the 2010 reorganization, the school had competed in the Watchung Conference, which consisted of high schools in Essex, Hudson and Union counties in northern New Jersey. With 1,293 students in grades 10-12, the school was classified by the NJSIAA for the 2019–20 school year as Group IV for most athletic competition purposes, which included schools with an enrollment of 1,060 to 5,049 students in that grade range. The football team competes in the Liberty Red division of the North Jersey Super Football Conference, which includes 112 schools competing in 20 divisions, making it the nation's biggest football-only high school sports league. The school was classified by the NJSIAA as Group V North for football for 2024–2026, which included schools with 1,317 to 5,409 students.

The school participates as the host school / lead agency in a joint ice hockey team with North Arlington High School and Secaucus High School. The co-op program operates under agreements scheduled to expire at the end of the 2023–24 school year.

The boys' cross country team won the overall state championship in 1936, 1937, 1938 (public school) and 1940, and won the Group IV title in 1947 and 1983. In 1978, Joe Weber, won the All-Groups Cross Country State Meet of Champions and was selected as an All-American. In 2004 and 2005 Joe Weber Jr. won the Hudson County Cross Country Championship. With the win in 2004, Joe and Joe Jr. became the second father/son duo in state history to win the same county championship, with Joe Sr. having won in 1977.

The boys' track team won the public school indoor track championship in 1927-1929, 1932 and 1936. The boys track team won the Group IV spring / outdoor track state championship in 1927.

The boys' soccer team has won NJSIAA Group IV state championship in 1947, 1948, 1950, 1951, 1954–1956, 1958, 1975 (as co-champions with Steinert High School), 1981 (vs. Hamilton High School West), 1982 (co-champions with Freehold Township High School), 1984 (vs. East Brunswick High School), 1987 (vs. Cherry Hill High School East), 1999 (vs. East Brunswick), 2002 (vs. Shawnee High School), 2004 (co-champion with Rancocas Valley Regional High School) and 2017 (vs. Princeton High School) and 2021 (vs. Freehold Township High School). The NJSIAA ranks the team's 10 state championships as tied for fifth-most among public high schools in the playoff era. NJ.com ranks the team third in the state, with a total of 18 titles that includes championships awarded to the school by the NJSIAA in 1947, 1948, 1950, 1951 and 1954. The 1984 team finished the season with a 24-0 record, making it the state's only unbeaten team, after winning the Group IV title with a 2-1 victory against East Brunswick in the championship game at Rutgers University. In 2002, the boys' soccer team earned the North I, Group IV sectional title, edging Clifton High School 3-2 in the tournament final. The 2017 team finished the season with a 21-0-3 record after winning the program's 12th Group IV title with a 3-1 victory against Princeton in the championship game. The 2021 team that finished the season with a 22-1-1 record after winning the program's 13th Group IV title with a 6-2 victory against Freehold Township in the championship game at Kean University.

In 1948, the Kearny High School varsity football team was awarded the New Jersey high school state championship.

The softball team won the North I sectional title in 1973 and won the Group IV state championship in 1982, defeating runner-up Edison High School in the tournament finals. The 1982 team took the lead after scoring four runs in the top of seventh and ended a rally in the bottom of the inning with a triple play to seal a 4-2 victory over Edison in the championship game at Mercer County Park to win the Group IV title and finish the season with a record of 24-3.

In 1973, coach Tom Krulik led the track team to win both the indoor and outdoor Big Ten Relays. The two-mile relay team set the New Jersey state record at 7:52 at the Highland Park Relays, earning an invitation to compete in the Nationals at the Penn Relays weeks later.

The baseball team won the North I, Group IV state sectional championship in 2003 with a 5-3 win vs. Ridgewood High School in the tournament final.

In 2007, the girls' soccer team, seeded #2, won the North I, Group IV state sectional championship with a 3-0 win over fourth-seeded Montclair High School in the tournament final, the team's second consecutive title. The team won the first-ever Hudson County Tournament, defeating Bayonne High School 6-0.

In 2009, the boys' indoor track and field team won the county championship as the team continues its return to its previous status when many nationally ranked relays and individuals competed for the school. In cross country the school has produced many county, conference and state champions.

The girls' cross country team won consecutive county championships in 2007 and 2008, in addition to four consecutive state sectional titles and a Meet of Champions title in 1986, when Liz Duarte took the Group IV title.

The Kardinals wrestling team won consecutive conference championships from 2001 to 2004 again in 2006, and then again in 2008 in the Watchung Conference. Dave Cordoba won the 1999 state championship at 130 lbs, and holds the school record for career victories.

In May 2016, the Kearny girls' crew Lightweight Four placed 3rd out of 15 boats at the Scholastic Rowing Association of America's National Championship Regatta, taking home the bronze medal. In May 2017 the Kearny girls'crew Lightweight Four placed 1st in the Garden State Championships, the Girls J8 placed 2nd qualifying them for nationals along with the Women's V4. In June 2017, the Girls J8 placed 1st in the National Schools Regatta, while the LWT 4 placed 2nd.

The boys' soccer team has won the Hudson County Interscholastic Athletic League - Red/American Division in 2010, 2012, 2014, 2015, 2016, 2017, 2019, 2021. The Kardinals also won the Hudson County Tournament in 2010 (vs. Bayonne High School), 2012 (vs. St. Peter's Preparatory School), 2014 (vs. North Bergen High School), 2015 (vs. Union City High School), 2017 (vs. St. Peter's Preparatory School), 2021 (vs. Harrison High School). Coach Bill Balka managed to lead the team to win all 4 major trophies in 2021.

The girls' soccer team has won the Hudson County Interscholastic Athletic League - Red/American Division in 2010, 2011, 2012, 2013, 2014, 2015, 2016, 2017, 2018, 2019, 2020 The Kardinals also won the Hudson County Tournament in 2010 (vs. Bayonne High School), 2011 (vs. Saint Dominic Academy), 2012 (vs. Bayonne High School), 2013 (vs. Bayonne High School), 2014 (vs. Memorial High School), 2015 (vs. Bayonne High School), 2016 (vs. Bayonne High School), 2017 (vs. North Bergen High School), 2018 (vs. Bayonne High School), 2019 (vs. Bayonne High School), 2021 (vs. North Bergen High School), Coach Michael Sylvia led the girls into winning their county final against North Bergen with a 4-0 victory at the Red Bull Arena.

=== Marching Unit ===
The Kearny High School Marching Unit has enjoyed several years of great success in the past. Most notably, they were Tournament of Bands Class III Atlantic Coast champions in 1985, and their percussion section won High Percussion honors for three years straight, from '83 to '85. In addition the Kearny High School Marching Unit under the direction of Patrick Ragnoni was group 3A USSBA Champions two years in a row in 1999 Marching Band Champion Show and 2000 Marching Band Champion Show

=== International Festival ===
Kearny High School conducts an annual International Festival. Each year in late May or June, the student body of Kearny High School has the opportunity to collectively display and celebrate its rich cultural diversity. On the day of the festival, students go down to the school's football field to visit the multiplicity of tents and tables that are set-up; with some selling food, desserts, and jewelry. Additionally, many students perform dances and play music native to their cultures for the entire student body to celebrate in. Kearny High School's student populated is largely represented by Irish-Americans, Peruvian-Americans, Portuguese-Americans, Brazilian-Americans, Puerto Rican-Americans, and Dominican-Americans, among many other groups. In 2010, the school celebrated its 13th Annual International Festival, of which featured over 85 different cultural tables.

== Legal cases and controversy ==
=== Religion in classroom controversy ===
In the autumn of 2006, a controversy was generated by the discovery that David Paszkiewicz, a history teacher at Kearny High of 14 years, taught Christian doctrine to his students during an American history class. When confronted by Kearny High School junior Matthew LaClair in a meeting with Paszkiewicz and the administration, Paszkiewicz denied the charge. After this, LaClair produced recorded tapes in which Paszkiewicz was recorded saying that God "did everything in his power to make sure that you could go to heaven, so much so that he took your sins on his own body, suffered your pains for you, and he's saying, 'Please, accept me, believe.' If you reject that, you belong in hell."

The teacher is said to have also taught that there were dinosaurs aboard Noah's Ark and that there is no scientific basis for evolution or the Big Bang theory of the origin of the universe.

The controversy raised questions over the legal right of students to record what teachers tell them during class, with some advocating the practice to ensure teacher accountability, and others arguing that it infringes on the teacher's personal liberty.

LaClair's supporters reported that "he has been the target of harassment and a death threat from fellow students and 'retaliation' by school officials who have treated him, not the teacher, as the problem. The retaliation, they say, includes the district's policy banning students from recording what is said in class without a teacher's permission and officials' refusal to punish students who have harassed Matthew."

Deborah Jacobs, executive director of the American Civil Liberties Union of New Jersey (ACLU-NJ) said Kearny High School had "violated the spirit and the letter of freedom of religion and the First Amendment", and that the ACLU would support the LaClairs if they were to file suit. The People for the American Way Foundation expressed similar support.

On November 16, 2006, The Jersey Journal reported that the district had taken "corrective action" against Paszkiewicz, the precise nature of which was not specified. The administrators stated that further action might be warranted, based on Paszkiewicz's continuing conduct.

This matter is the subject of an hour-long documentary film In God We Teach, which includes statements from a variety of people involved (in particular both the teacher and student) as well as others outside the school.

=== Sexual conduct allegation ===
During the 2006-07 school year Celeste Adamski, a 27-year-old English teacher was suspended with pay on suspicion of sexual activity with one or more of her students. In mid-October she pleaded guilty to an allegation concerning her behavior with a male student as part of a plea agreement in which she gave up her teaching certificate and was barred from teaching or holding a public job.

== Administration ==
The school's principal is Curtis Brack. His administration team includes two assistant principals and the athletic director.

== Notable alumni ==
- Karen Akunowicz (born 1978, class of 1996), award-winning chef, Top Chef contestant
- Marcello Borges (born 1997), soccer player who plays for Atlantic City in the National Premier Soccer League
- John F. Cali (1928–1992), politician who represented the 30th Legislative District in the New Jersey General Assembly from 1974 to 1980
- Gary Michael Cappetta (born 1952), professional wrestling ring announcer, author, voice over artist, screenwriter and stage performer
- Sam Dente (1922–2002), major league baseball shortstop from 1947 to 1955
- Jennifer Dore (born 1971), US National Team rower at the 1996 and 2000 Olympics, who was winner of the world championships in 1995
- Santiago Formoso (born 1953), former soccer defender who spent five seasons in the North American Soccer League and earned seven caps with the U.S. national team in 1976 and 1977
- Franco Gamero (born 1990), international footballer who has played for the Puerto Rico national football team
- George Glasgow (1931–2013, class of 1949), basketball player and soccer coach who served as the head coach of the FDU Knights men's soccer team from 1956 to 1969 and 1974 to 1976
- Gene Grabowski, former soccer forward who earned a cap with the United States men's national soccer team in a 1958 FIFA World Cup qualification game
- Ed Halicki (born 1950), baseball pitcher who played for the San Francisco Giants
- John Harkes (born 1967), soccer player who was captain of the US Men's National team for ten years, playing in two World Cups (1990 and 1994) and an Olympian
- Jeffrey Klepacki (born 1968), rowing Olympian in 1992, 1996 and 2000, who was world champion in 1994, 1998 and 1999
- Joan Lippincott (born 1935), concert organist and former head of the organ department at Westminster Choir College
- Martyna Majok (born 1985, class of 2003), Pulitzer Prize winning playwright
- Paul McCurrie (1929–2020), lawyer and politician who served in the New Jersey General Assembly
- Steve McLean (born 1961), retired soccer forward who played professionally in the Major Indoor Soccer League and was a member of the U.S. team at the 1981 FIFA World Youth Championship
- Meagan McClelland (born 2000), professional soccer goalkeeper for USL Super League club Carolina Ascent FC
- Tony Meola (born 1969), soccer goalkeeper and USMNT goalkeeper at 1990 and 1994 World Cups
- Brian O'Hara (born 1979, class of 1997), law enforcement official who is serving as the 54th Chief of the Minneapolis Police Department
- Bill Sheppell (born 1926, class of 1944), former soccer forward who played in both the American Soccer League and German American Soccer League
- Archie Stark (1897–1985), early American soccer player
- Bob Stanley (born 1954), class of 1973, baseball pitcher for Boston Red Sox
- Ray Toro (born 1977), guitarist for My Chemical Romance
- Alex Webster (born 1931), former fullback and head coach for the New York Giants
- Ray Yagiello (born 1923), former Los Angeles Rams player and Montclair State University head football coach
