= Paul McCurrie =

American politician (1929–2020)

Member of the New Jersey General Assembly
- In office 1962–1964

Personal details
- Born: March 27, 1929; Kearny, New Jersey, U.S.
- Died: May 15, 2020 (aged 91); Newark, New Jersey, U.S.

Paul J. McCurrie (March 27, 1929 – May 15, 2020) was an American lawyer and politician from New Jersey.

McCurrie was born in Kearny, and graduated in 1947 from Kearny High School. He served in the United States Navy and was commissioned an ensign. McCurrie received his law degree from Rutgers Law School and practiced law in Kearny, New Jersey. McCurrie served in the New Jersey General Assembly from 1962 to 1964 and was a Democrat.

McCurrie died of COVID-19 in Newark, on May 15, 2020, at age 91. His wife had also died from the virus 3 days earlier.
