= Fairleigh Dickinson Knights men's basketball =

American collegiate basketball team

2026–27 Fairleigh Dickinson Knights men's basketball team
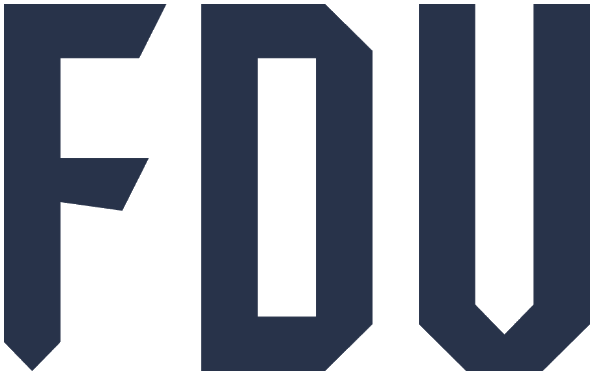
- University: Fairleigh Dickinson University
- Head coach: Jack Castleberry (4th season)
- Location: Hackensack, New Jersey
- Arena: Bogota Savings Bank Center (capacity: 1,852)
- Conference: Northeast Conference
- Nickname: Knights
- Colors: Burgundy and blue

NCAA Division I tournament round of 32
- 1963*, 2023

NCAA Division I tournament appearances
- 1963*, 1985, 1988, 1998, 2005, 2016, 2019, 2023

Conference tournament champions
- 1985, 1988, 1998, 2005, 2016, 2019

Conference regular-season champions
- 1982, 1986, 1988, 1991, 2006, 2019

Uniforms
Home	Away
- * at Division II level

The Fairleigh Dickinson Knights men's basketball is the NCAA Division I intercollegiate men's basketball program that represents Fairleigh Dickinson University in Hackensack, New Jersey. The school's team currently competes in the Northeast Conference (NEC) and plays their home games at the Bogota Savings Bank Center. The Knights have appeared seven times in the NCAA Tournament, most recently in 2023.

Fairleigh Dickinson's most notable NCAA tournament run came in the 2023 NCAA tournament. On March 17, 2023, during March Madness, the Knights became the second men's No. 16 seed team and first First Four team to beat a No. 1 seed team when they defeated the Purdue Boilermakers, 63–58. They also advanced past the Round of 64 for the first time in the school's history.

== Postseason results ==
=== NCAA Division I ===
The Knights have appeared in seven NCAA tournaments. Their combined record is 3–7.

Year	Seed	Round	Opponent	Result
1985	#16	First Round	#1 Michigan	L 55–59
1988	#16	First Round	#1 Purdue	L 79–94
1998	#15	First Round	#2 Connecticut	L 85–93
2005	#16	First Round	#1 Illinois	L 55–67
2016	#16	First Four	#16 Florida Gulf Coast	L 65–96
2019	#16	First Four; First Round	#16 Prairie View A&M #1 Gonzaga	W 82–76; L 49–87
2023	#16	First Four; First Round; Second Round	#16 Texas Southern #1 Purdue #9 Florida Atlantic	W 84–61; W 63–58; L 70–78

=== NCAA Division II ===
The Knights appeared in one NCAA Division II men's basketball tournament. Their combined record was 0–2.

Year	Round	Opponent	Result
1963	First Round; Regional Third Place	Springfield; Assumption	L 54–66; L 51–66

=== NAIA tournament results ===
The Knights appeared in two NAIA tournaments. Their record was 1–2.

Year	Round	Opponent	Result
1952	First Round	Indiana State	L 72–79
1959	First Round; Second Round	Culver-Stockton; Illinois State	W 77–66; L 64–68

=== NIT results ===
The Knights have appeared in two National Invitation Tournaments (NIT). Their combined record is 0–2.

Year	Round	Opponent	Result
1991	First Round	Siena	L 85–90
2006	Opening Round	Manhattan	L 77–80

== Notable players ==
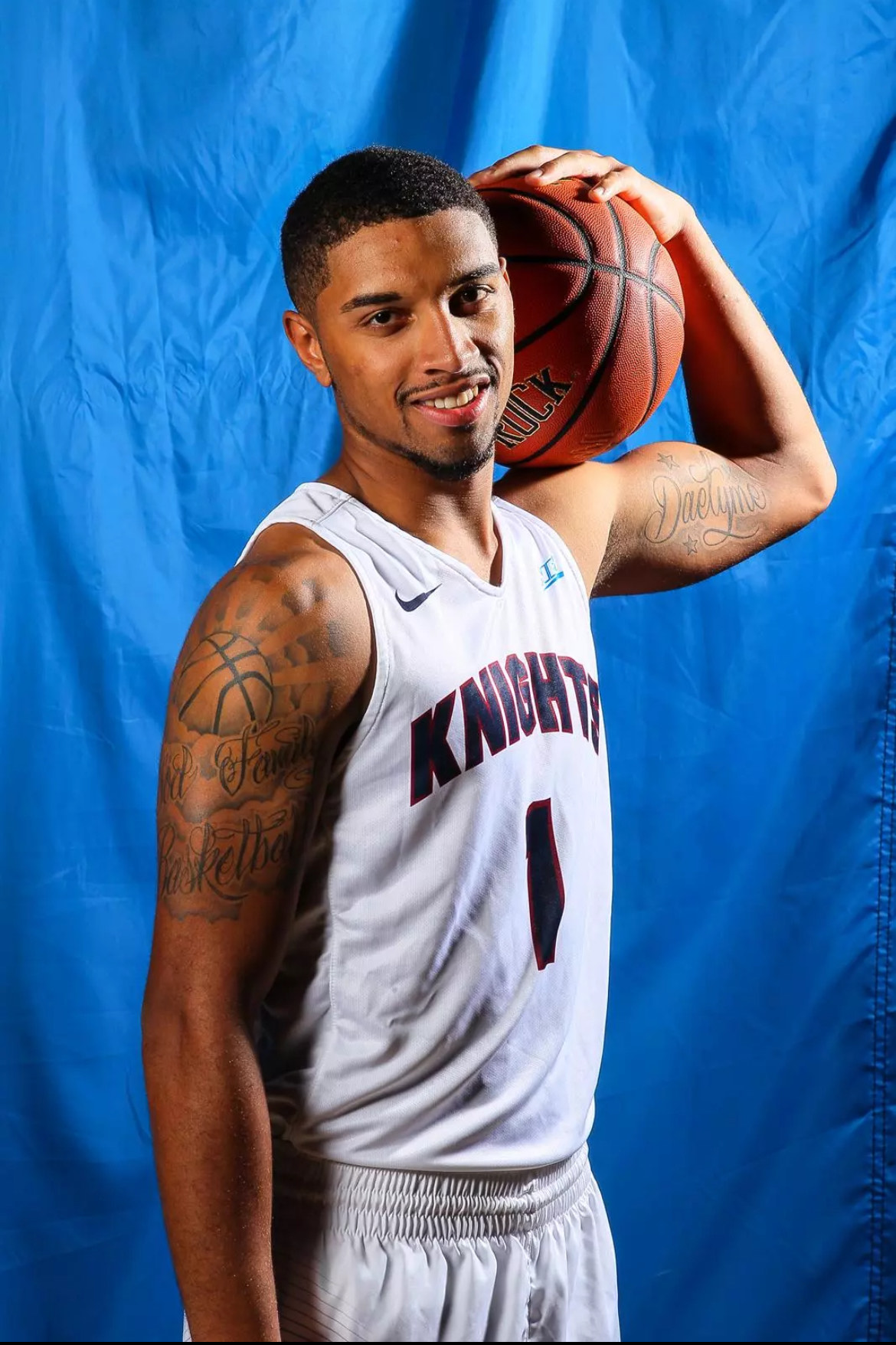
Darnell Edge

- Darnell Edge (born 1997), basketball player in the Cyprus Basketball Division A
- Seth Greenberg, ESPN college basketball analyst

=== National Basketball Association (NBA) ===
No Fairleigh Dickinson player has ever played in the NBA. Three former players have been selected in the NBA draft:

- Marcus Gaither, 1984 NBA draft, pick 108 by the Utah Jazz
- Ken Webb, 1981 NBA draft, pick 164 by the Detroit Pistons
- George Glasgow, 1953 NBA draft, pick 10 by the Fort Wayne Pistons
