= Franco Gamero =

American-born Puerto Rican footballer

Personal information
- Full name: Franco Carlos Gamero
- Date of birth: October 11, 1990 (age 36)
- Place of birth: Kearny, New Jersey, U.S.
- Position: Striker

Youth career
- 2009–2013: NJIT Highlanders

Senior career*
Years	Team	Apps	(Gls)
2013	NJ-LUSO Rangers	11	(1)

International career^{‡}
2012	Puerto Rico	2	(0)
- * Club domestic league appearances and goals as of May 19, 2012 ‡ National team caps and goals as of May 19, 2012

Franco Carlos Gamero (born October 11, 1990) is a Puerto Rican former international footballer.

Raised in Kearny, New Jersey, Gamero played prep soccer at Kearny High School.

== Career ==
Gamero has played for NJIT Highlanders.

Gamero made his senior international debut for Puerto Rico in 2012.
