= Kenneth G. Wiman =

US Coast Guard rear admiral (1930–2021)

Kenneth Gustave Wiman (October 1, 1930 – March 25, 2021) was a rear admiral in the United States Coast Guard.

== Biography ==
Wiman was born on October 1, 1930, in Kearny, New Jersey. He graduated from Rensselaer Polytechnic Institute. He was married and has five children.

== Career ==
Wiman graduated from the United States Coast Guard Academy in 1952. During the Korean War, he served aboard the USS Ramsden (DE-382). Later, he was assigned to the USCGC Mackinac (WAVP-371), the USCGC Campbell (WPG-32) and the USCGC Mendota (WHEC-69).

Other assignments included being stationed in Ketchikan, Alaska, and Galveston, Texas. In 1981, he became Chief of Research and Development of the Coast Guard.

During his career, Wiman was awarded the Meritorious Service Medal three times. He retired in 1988.
