= Kearny, New Jersey =

Town in Hudson County, New Jersey, US

- Town
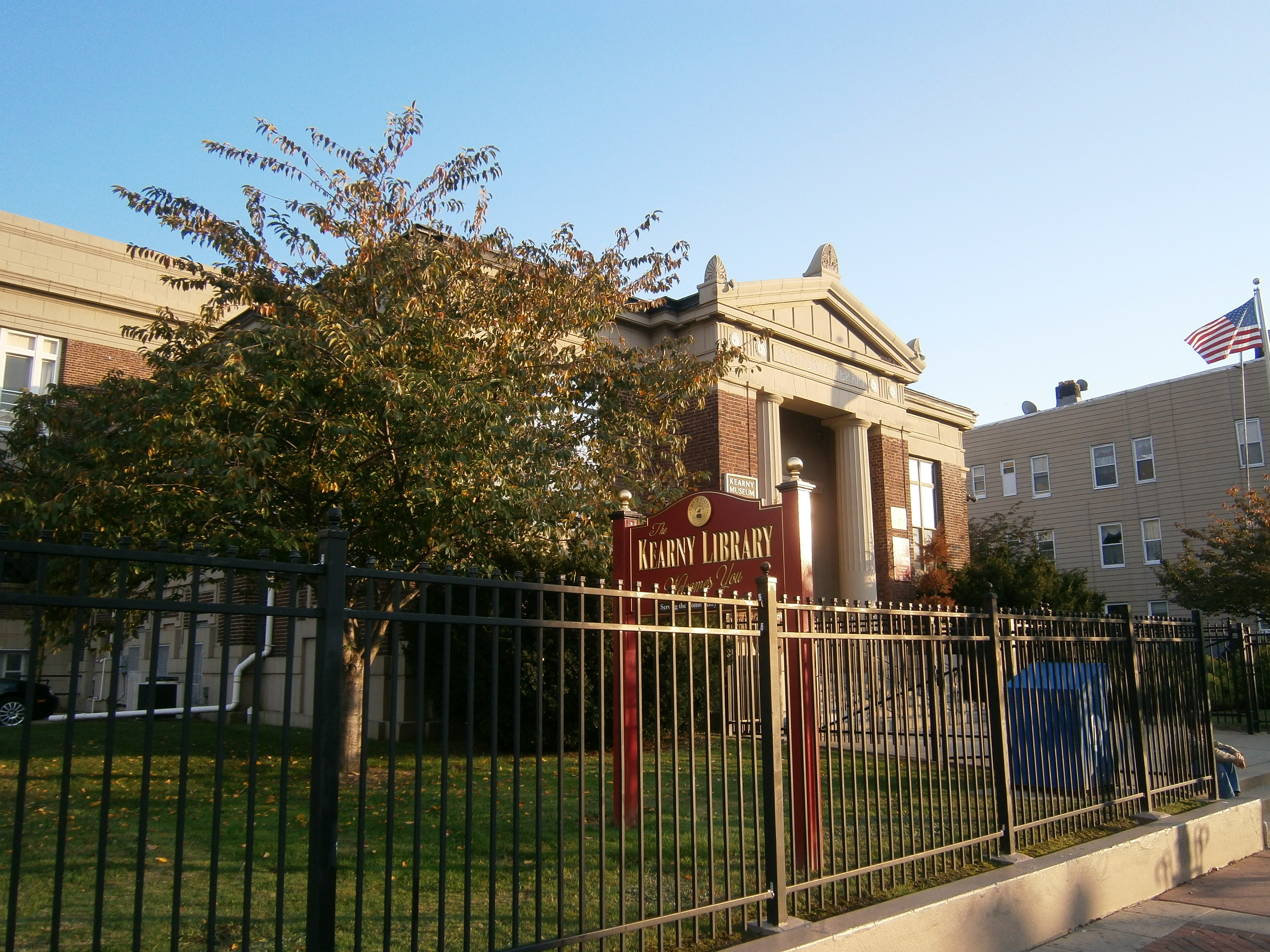
- Kearny Library and Museum, November 2011

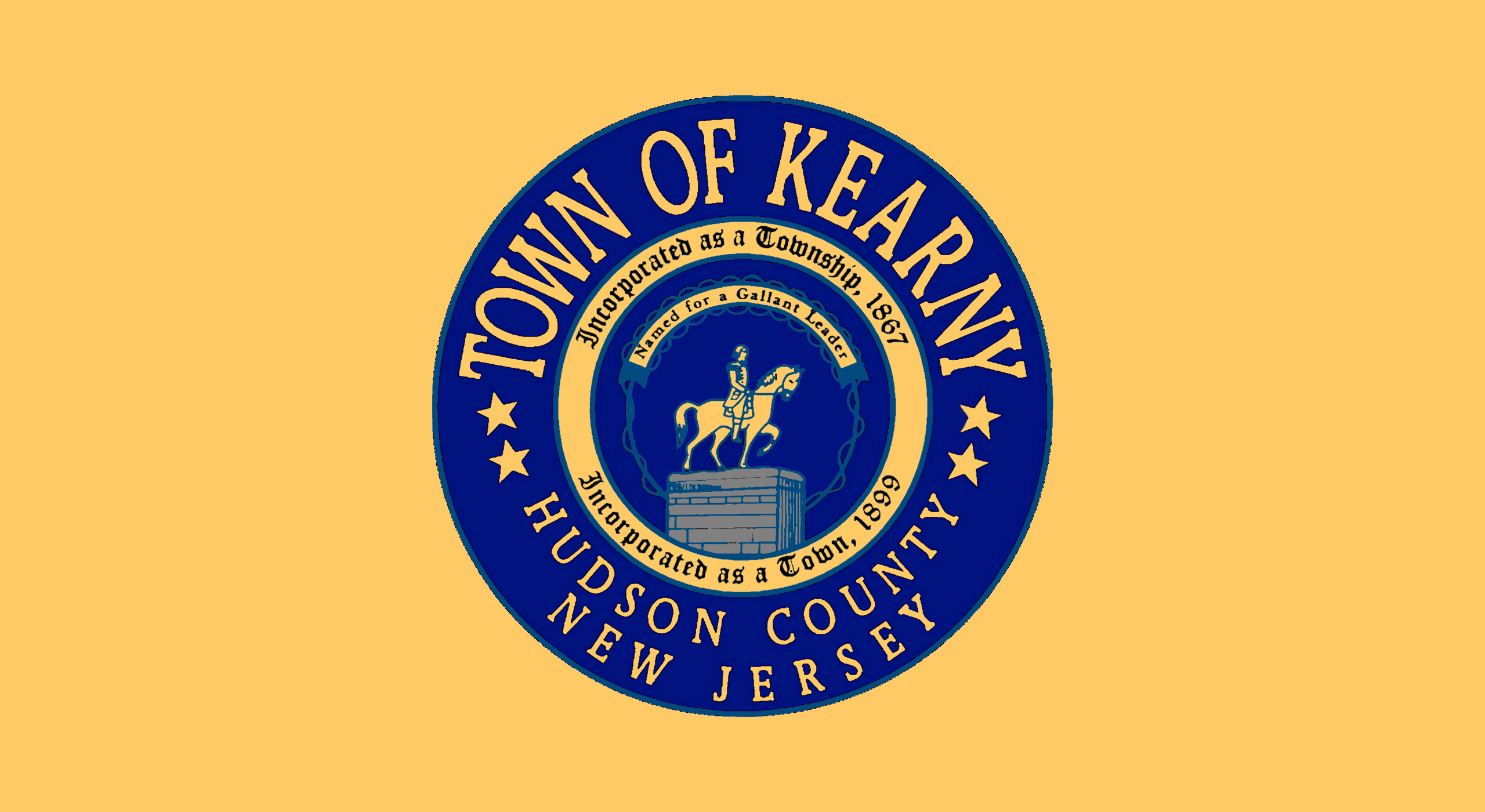
- Flag Seal
- Nicknames: Soccer Town, U.S.A.; K-Town
- Interactive map of Kearny, New Jersey
- Location in Hudson County Location in New Jersey Location in the United States
- Coordinates: 40.752332°N 74.123093°W
- Country: United States
- State: New Jersey
- County: Hudson
- Incorporated: April 8, 1867
- Named for: Philip Kearny

Government
  - Type: Town
  - Body: Town Council
  - Mayor: Carol Jean Doyle (I)
  - Administrator: Stephen Marks
  - Municipal clerk: Pat Carpenter

Area
  - Total: 10.27 sq mi (26.61 km^{2})
  - Land: 8.85 sq mi (22.91 km^{2})
  - Water: 1.43 sq mi (3.70 km^{2}) 13.91%
  - Rank: 209th of 565 in state 3rd of 12 in county
- Elevation: 7 ft (2.1 m)

Population (2020)
  - Total: 41,999
  - Estimate (2023): 39,370
  - Rank: 54th of 565 in state 7th of 12 in county
  - Density: 4,748.9/sq mi (1,833.6/km^{2})
  - Rank: 122nd of 565 in state 11th of 12 in county
- Time zone: UTC−05:00 (Eastern (EST))
  - Summer (DST): UTC−04:00 (Eastern (EDT))
- ZIP Codes: 07032, 07099
- Area codes: 201 and 973
- FIPS code: 3401736510
- GNIS feature ID: 0885266
- Website: www.kearnynj.org

Kearny (/ˈkɑːrni/ KAR-nee) is a town in the western part of Hudson County, in the U.S. state of New Jersey, and a suburb of Newark. As of the 2020 United States census, the town's population was 41,999, an increase of 1,315 (+3.2%) from the 2010 census count of 40,684, which in turn reflected an increase of 171 (+0.4%) from the 40,513 counted in the 2000 census.

Kearny is named after Civil War general Philip Kearny. It began as a township formed by an act of the New Jersey Legislature on April 8, 1867, from portions of Harrison Township. Portions of the township were taken on July 3, 1895, to form East Newark. Kearny was incorporated as a town on January 19, 1899, based on the results of a referendum held two days earlier. The Arlington section of town was named for Arlington Station on the Erie Railroad at the Arlington Mill plant, owned by Arlington Mills of Lawrence, Massachusetts.

== History ==
=== Colonial roots ===
The area of Kearny Township, created in 1867, had been part of the original Crown Grant of 30,000 acres (120 km^{2}) obtained by Major William Sandford of Barbados on July 4, 1668. Major Sandford named it New Barbadoes Neck after his old home. As was the custom of the time, the Major paid 20 pounds sterling to Chief Tantaqua of the Hackensack tribe for all their reserve rights and titles.

Sanford's Uncle, Major Nathaniel Kingsland acquired the property in 1708 and sold the upper western tract of the Grant for 300 pounds sterling to Captain Arent Schuyler two years later. The new purchase included present-day Kearny, North Arlington, Lyndhurst and Kingsland.

Shortly after Schuyler's purchase of his new homestead, a peculiar green stone was uncovered. It was sent to England for analysis and he learned that it contained 80% copper. His opening of a copper mine brought the first steam engine to America from England; it was used to pump out the deep mine shaft. The engine was secretly delivered by its engineer, Josiah Hornblower. The engine and mines were destroyed by fire in 1772 and remained idle for some years.

Schuyler Mansion played a role during the American Revolutionary War Era. When Lord Howe of England took possession of New York Harbor, the proximity of Schuyler Mansion drew many of his officers. They generally traveled over a road that today is referred to as the Belleville Turnpike, which was originally constructed in 1759 using cedar logs from the nearby swamps.

During September 1777, General Henry Clinton, head of the British Expeditionary Forces in America, selected Schuyler Mansion for his headquarters during one of his more important raiding operations, which included the famed Battle of Second River. The Mansion stood until 1924, a period of 214 years, when it was torn-down by a land development company, despite the company's offers to transfer the land to an organization that would be able to pay to maintain the property.

=== 19th century ===
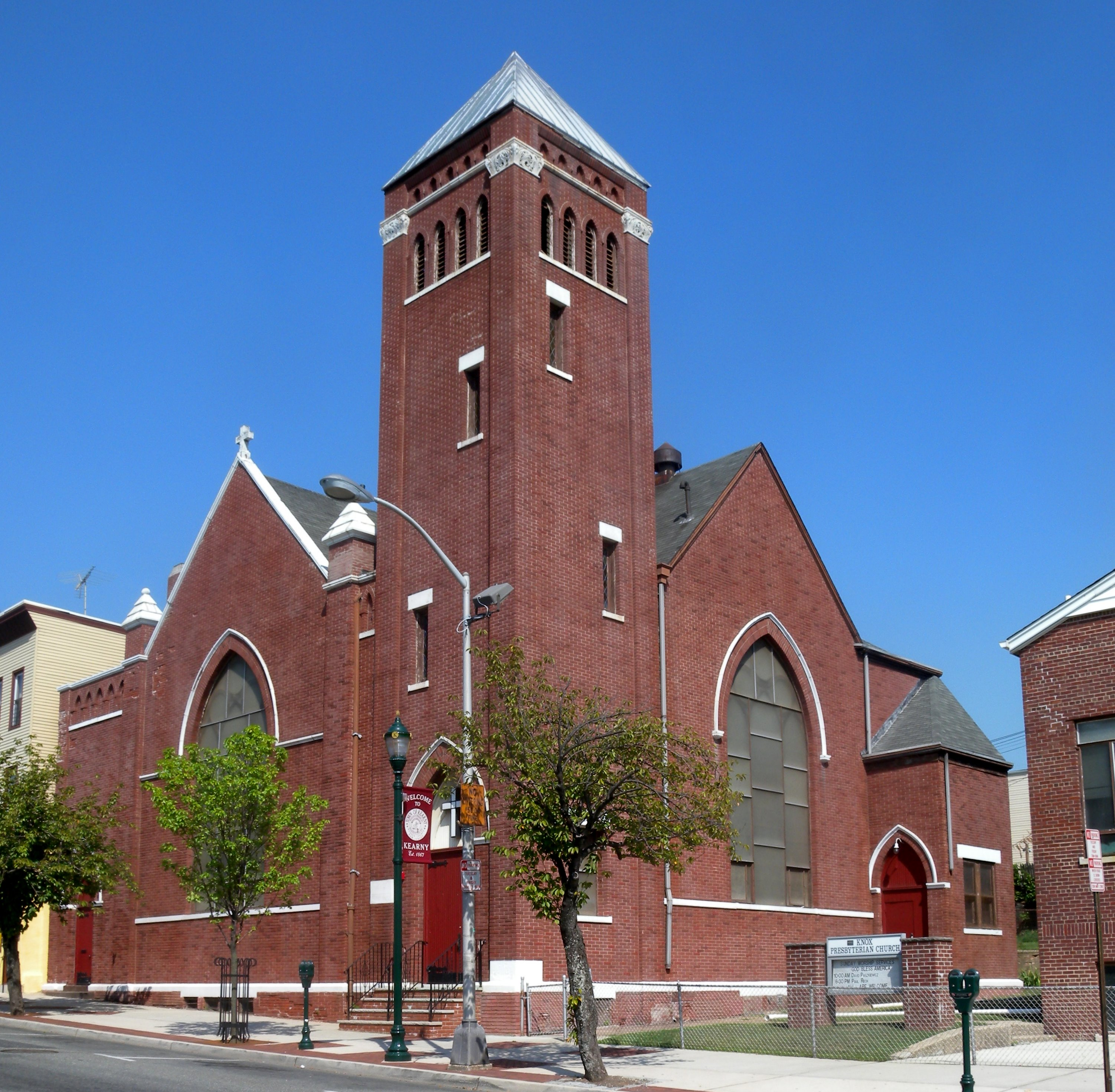
Knox Presbyterian Church

In the middle 19th century, Kearny was the upper, or northern, section of the Township of Harrison. A prominent citizen and resident of the upper section, General N. M. Halsted, felt it was impossible under these political conditions for his section to obtain proper recognition. He engaged an energetic campaign for an independent township. He succeeded when the NJ Legislature of 1867 on March 14, adopted "an act creating the Township of Kearny". The town was named to honor Major General Philip Kearny, Commander of the New Jersey Forces in the Civil War and the owner of the mansion known as Belle Grove (or Belgrove), locally called "Kearny Castle".

On April 8, 1867, the first election of town officers was held. General N. M. Halsted was elected chairman. The first official seat of Government was three rooms in the old Lodi Hotel, on the northeast corner of Schuyler and Harrison Avenues.

In the early 1870s, Kearny erected its first Town Hall, on the corner of Kearny and Woodland Avenues, the present site of the Knox Presbyterian Church Parish Hall. This served as a Town Hall, Court House, and Schoolhouse. The Minute Book of the Township states on August 16, 1870, the first step toward establishing Kearny's present public school system was taken. The first schoolhouse was housed in the Town Hall built at Kearny and Woodland Avenues in 1873.

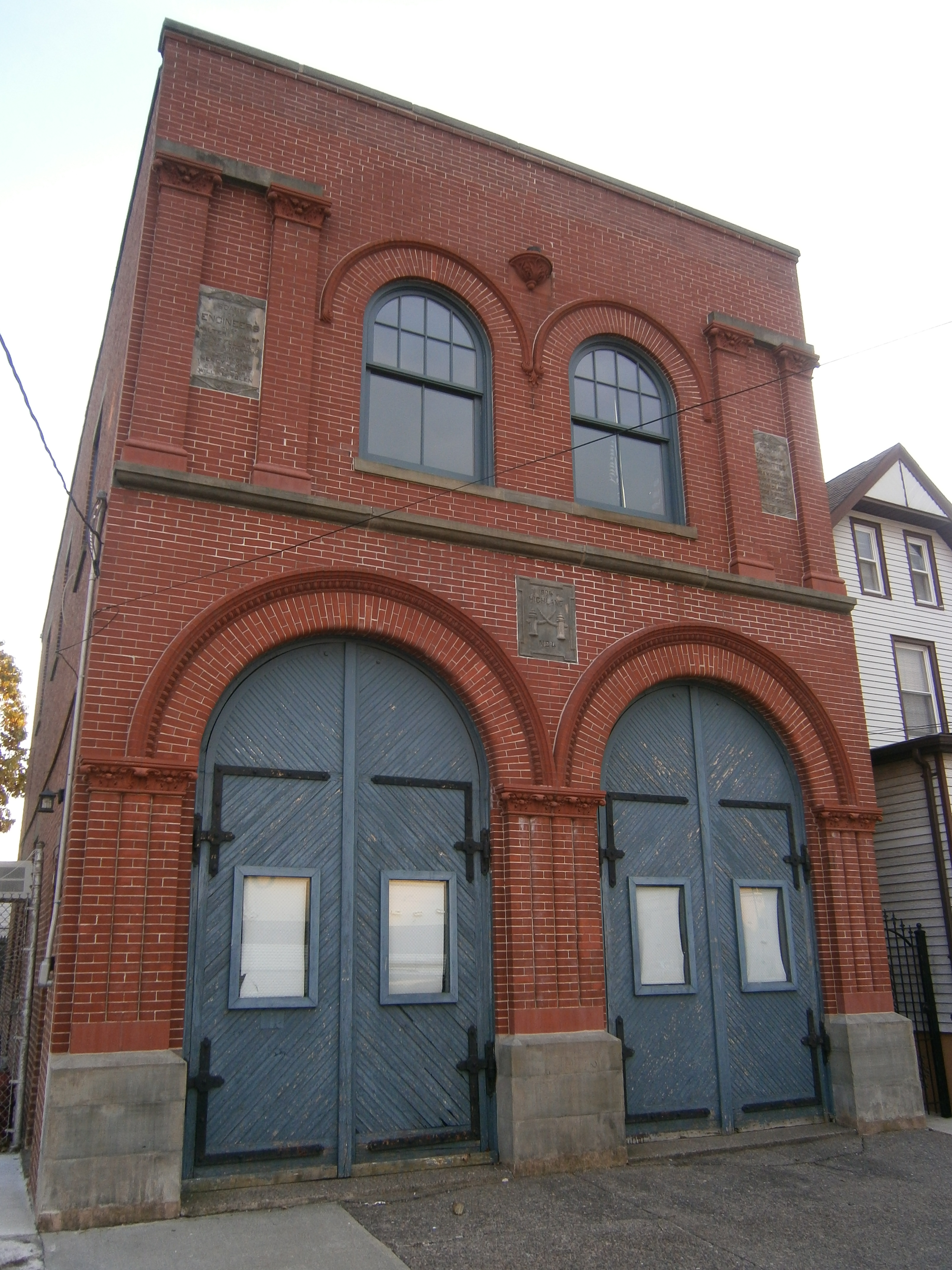
Highland Hose No. 4

The Highland Hose No. 4 firehouse, listed on the National Register of Historic Places, was built in 1895.

The town's nickname, "Soccer Town, U.S.A." is derived from a soccer tradition that originated in the mid-1870s, when thousands of Scottish and Irish immigrants settled in the town, after two Scottish companies, Clark Thread Company and Nairn Linoleum, opened two local mills and a factory.

When the town's growth demanded larger quarters, the present Kearny Town Hall, built of Indiana limestone, was erected in 1909.

=== Factory town ===
The early influx and development of industry in Kearny dates back to 1875 when the Clark Thread Company of Paisley in Scotland extended its activities to the United States by erecting two large mills in Kearny, and adding two others in 1890. These mills brought to Kearny thousands of Scots immigrants. Many of them would play on Kearny's soccer teams in National Association Football League. Many are buried at Arlington Memorial Park in the Kearny Uplands.

In 1876, the Mile End Thread Mills started operating, giving employment to several hundred operators.

In 1883, the Marshall Flax Spinning Company of England erected a large plant in Kearny, known as the Linen Thread Company. Their need for experienced flax spinners brought an influx of workers from other sections of the British Isles. Families of those early textile workers were the nucleus of Kearny's present population.

The Puraline Manufacturing Company, later called the Arlington Company, which became a subsidiary of E. I. DuPont de Nemours Company, had purchased a large tract of land east of the Arlington Station on the Erie Railroad extending well out, north of the railroad embankment, into the meadowland.

In 1887, Sir Michael Nairn established the Nairn Linoleum Company of Kirkcaldy in Scotland, now the Congoleum Nairn Company of Kearny, giving further impetus to local industrial growth. This also led to the growth in the Scottish American population which in the 1960s was about 21,000, accounting for more than half of the town's residents.

In 1902, the Lovell–Dressel Company, manufacturers of marine and railway lamps and fixtures, located in Kearny adjacent to the Erie Railroad.

Other industries which located in Kearny include: Swift & Company, Koppers Company, Theobald Industries, Standard Tool & Manufacturing, Wilkata Box Company, Harris Steel Company and L & R Manufacturing.

Cargo ships were built at Kearny Yards during World War I, and warships during World War II.

=== Kearny Works ===
On June 15, 1928, Western Electric broke ground on their second manufacturing facility at 110 Central Avenue to be known as Kearny Works, which would grow to 3,579,000 square feet (332,500 m^{2}) throughout the years and be the second- largest Western Electric manufacturing plant built before the 1930s, behind the Hawthorne Works at Cicero, Illinois.

Between 1925 and 1986, the Kearny Works of Western Electric employed as many as 24,000 in producing a variety of hardware and supplies for the Bell System. It was sold by AT&T in 1984, by which time the plant had 4,000 employees who earned a total of $128 million a year, making it one of the county's largest employers. Henry J. Hill, the mayor of Kearny at the time of the AT&T Kearny Works closure, had himself worked 41 years at the facility as a manufacturing manager and retired three years prior to the closure.

=== Movie and television filming ===
In 1982, filming occurred in Kearny at a railroad bridge previously owned by Conrail until closure in 1977. The abandoned bridge, located at the Passaic River is called the NX Bridge and it was used for the motion picture, Annie. Several scenes were done with the bridge in its open position. Locals call this bridge the "Annie Bridge" and has not had freight operations since the closure.

Scenes from the HBO drama series The Sopranos were filmed in Kearny. One of its buildings, used for Satriale's Pork Store, was later razed to prepare for a parking lot. An Irish pub now resides where Satriale's was located.

The film Spinning Gold, which had been delayed during the pandemic for completion, had scenes filmed in Kearny.

The 2022 horror movie, Smile had a scene filmed at Jersey Oil located at 926 Passaic Avenue. The film is attributed as entirely filmed in New Jersey.

Kearny Point has two studios that are part of the film and television industry. Kearny Mayor Al Santos confirmed, "...our vision for Kearny Point as a hub for film and television production. This investment will create employment opportunities and bring increased economic activity to our community."

== Theaters ==
Kearny had a few theaters for film showings starting in the early 20th Century. The few that had opened approximately before World War I were no longer listed among the three theaters of the 1920s and 1930s that opened. Those early movie theaters had been repurposed for other building uses either as apartments or meeting places. The ones that opened during the 1920s and 1930s took a few decades to close. The Lincoln Theater was operating until August 2015. The empty Lincoln Theater was placed for sale after the closure, until September 2022 when it was purchased for $975,000. The new owner realized opening the theater again, without movie business knowledge, would not be the plans for the business and will proceed instead to have apartments approved by the town for the property redevelopment. There are no movie theaters currently operating in the township.

Here was a list of the former theaters:

Name	Address	Built	Seats	Association	Closure	Significance	Current Status
Arlington Playhouse	Kearny and Midland Ave	1912	?	?	?	Saturday matinees.	Closed
Crescent	Midland Ave between Forest and Elm Streets	1908	?	?	1914	First movie theater by Alonzo Nicholas. Admission five cents.	Closed
The Grand	25 Kearny Ave	?	?	?	?	?	Closed, currently an apartment building
The Casino	95 Kearny Ave	?	?	?	?	?	Closed, currently Irish-American Club
The Temple	225 Kearny Ave	?	?	?	?	?	Closed, currently the Copestone Masonic Temple
Hudson Theatre	65 Kearny Avenue	1927	1,491	-	1950	Provided two first run movies and children's showings.	Closed, current as Kearny Family Health Center
Lincoln Cinemas	838 Kearny Avenue	1934	1,267	Warner Bros. Circuit Management Corp.	1995	Started as one screen and then became three screens in the 1970s. The movie theater caught on fire in the mid 1970s. Upon closure, was six screens.	Closed, building sold 2022
Regent Theater	413 Kearny Avenue and Grove Street	1922	1,781		mid 1950s-	August 30, 1952, a fire occurred and 300 people escaped. Roof damaged due to fire.	Closed

== Geography ==
According to the United States Census Bureau, the town had a total area of 10.27 square miles (26.6 km^{2}), including 8.84 square miles (22.9 km^{2}) of land and 1.43 square miles (3.7 km^{2}) of water (13.91%).

Unincorporated communities, localities and place names located partially or completely within the town include Arlington, New Jersey, Schuylers Corner and West Arlington.

The town is bordered by East Newark and Harrison in Hudson County, and by Lyndhurst and North Arlington in Bergen County. The Passaic River separates the town from Newark and Belleville, both located in Essex County. The Hackensack River separates it from Secaucus and Jersey City.

The town is varied in topography and roughly divided into three parts: the Kearny Uplands, the Kearny Meadows and South Kearny, where the Hackensack and Passaic rivers meet. Main thoroughfares include the eponymous Kearny Avenue (the local segment of Ridge Road / Frank E. Rodgers Boulevard), Bergen Avenue, Midland Avenue, Schuyler Avenue and Passaic Avenue.

A number of small parks running along the Passaic River are collectively called Riverbank Park. The largest, located on the colloquial "Bunnyland Hill", is a gift from Kearny's veterans. It is named after a small zoo named Bunnyland, which was maintained by the local Kiwanis Club, that occupied part of the present Bunnyland Hill in the 20th century. During Kearny's Fourth of July celebrations (which include a fireworks display), Bunnyland Hill is the primary gathering spot for celebrants and observers. The largest park is West Hudson Park, shared with Harrison, which contains a variety of sports fields, recreational areas, and an artificial pond. The second largest recreational zone is the Kearny Playground at Gunnel Oval.

== Demographics ==
Historical population
Census	Pop.	Note	%±
1880	777		—
1890	7,064		809.1%
1900	10,896		54.2%
1910	18,659		71.2%
1920	26,724		43.2%
1930	40,716		52.4%
1940	39,467		−3.1%
1950	39,952		1.2%
1960	37,472		−6.2%
1970	37,585		0.3%
1980	35,735		−4.9%
1990	34,874		−2.4%
2000	40,513		16.2%
2010	40,684		0.4%
2020	41,999		3.2%
2023 (est.)	39,370	▼	−6.3%
Population sources: 1880–1920 1880–1890; 1890–1910 1900–1930; 1940–2000 2000; 2010 2020

=== Racial and ethnic composition ===
Kearny town, New Jersey – Racial and ethnic composition Note: the US Census treats Hispanic/Latino as an ethnic category. This table excludes Latinos from the racial categories and assigns them to a separate category. Hispanics/Latinos may be of any race.
Race / Ethnicity (NH = Non-Hispanic)	Pop 2000	Pop 2010	Pop 2020	% 2000	% 2010	% 2020
White alone (NH)	24,425	19,816	14,889	60.29%	48.71%	35.45%
Black or African American alone (NH)	1,442	1,721	1,246	3.56%	4.23%	2.97%
Native American or Alaska Native alone (NH)	50	43	37	0.12%	0.11%	0.09%
Asian alone (NH)	2,206	1,746	2,034	5.45%	4.29%	4.84%
Native Hawaiian or Pacific Islander alone (NH)	14	22	23	0.03%	0.05%	0.05%
Other race alone (NH)	361	523	1,285	0.89%	1.29%	3.06%
Mixed race or Multiracial (NH)	940	560	2,020	2.32%	1.38%	4.81%
Hispanic or Latino (any race)	11,075	16,253	20,465	27.34%	39.95%	48.73%
Total	40,513	40,684	41,999	100.00%	100.00%	100.00%

=== 2020 census ===
As of the 2020 census, Kearny had a population of 41,999. The median age was 38.1 years. 20.2% of residents were under the age of 18 and 13.6% of residents were 65 years of age or older. For every 100 females there were 100.7 males, and for every 100 females age 18 and over there were 99.5 males age 18 and over.

100.0% of residents lived in urban areas, while 0.0% lived in rural areas.

There were 14,639 households in Kearny, of which 34.7% had children under the age of 18 living in them. Of all households, 46.9% were married-couple households, 19.0% were households with a male householder and no spouse or partner present, and 27.6% were households with a female householder and no spouse or partner present. About 20.9% of all households were made up of individuals and 7.9% had someone living alone who was 65 years of age or older.

There were 15,392 housing units, of which 4.9% were vacant. The homeowner vacancy rate was 0.7% and the rental vacancy rate was 2.6%.

=== 2010 census ===
The 2010 United States census counted 40,684 people, 13,462 households, and 9,921 families in the town. The population density was 4,636.5 people per square mile (1,790.2 people/km^{2}). There were 14,180 housing units at an average density of 1,616.0 units per square mile (623.9 units/km^{2}). The racial makeup was 73.57% (29,933) White, 5.37% (2,186) Black or African American, 0.40% (163) Native American, 4.41% (1,793) Asian, 0.08% (32) Pacific Islander, 12.53% (5,099) from other races, and 3.63% (1,478) from two or more races. Hispanic or Latino of any race were 39.95% (16,253) of the population.

Of the 13,462 households, 33.5% had children under the age of 18; 51.6% were married couples living together; 15.6% had a female householder with no husband present and 26.3% were non-families. Of all households, 21.0% were made up of individuals and 7.7% had someone living alone who was 65 years of age or older. The average household size was 2.83 and the average family size was 3.28.

20.7% of the population were under the age of 18, 11.0% from 18 to 24, 31.2% from 25 to 44, 26.4% from 45 to 64, and 10.7% who were 65 years of age or older. The median age was 36.4 years. For every 100 females, the population had 106.0 males. For every 100 females ages 18 and older there were 105.7 males.

The Census Bureau's 2006–2010 American Community Survey showed that (in 2010 inflation-adjusted dollars) median household income was $58,698 (with a margin of error of ±$3,838) and the median family income was $66,272 (±$3,803). Males had a median income of $45,360 (±$2,598) versus $38,668 (±$3,893) for females. The per capita income for the borough was $24,977 (±$1,022). About 7.6% of families and 10.3% of the population were below the poverty line, including 14.2% of those under age 18 and 8.1% of those age 65 or over.

=== 2000 census ===
As of the 2000 United States census there were 40,513 people, 13,539 households, and 9,802 families residing in the town. The population density was 4,433.2 inhabitants per square mile (1,711.7/km^{2}). There were 13,872 housing units at an average density of 1,518.0 units per square mile (586.1 units/km^{2}). The racial makeup of the town was 75.75% White, 3.97% African American, 0.37% Native American, 5.50% Asian, 0.07% Pacific Islander, 10.04% from other races, and 4.31% from two or more races. Hispanic or Latino of any race were 27.34% of the population.

There were 13,539 households, out of which 34.6% had children under the age of 18 living with them, 53.8% were married couples living together, 13.2% had a female householder with no husband present, and 27.6% were non-families. 21.8% of all households were made up of individuals, and 8.8% had someone living alone who was 65 years of age or older. The average household size was 2.81 and the average family size was 3.28.

In the town, the population was spread out, with 21.5% under the age of 18, 10.7% from 18 to 24, 35.7% from 25 to 44, 21.3% from 45 to 64, and 10.9% who were 65 years of age or older. The median age was 35 years. For every 100 females, there were 106.6 males. For every 100 females age 18 and over, there were 107.0 males.

The median income for a household in the town was $47,757, and the median income for a family was $54,596. Males had a median income of $38,672 versus $30,620 for females. The per capita income for the town was $20,886. About 6.1% of families and 8.6% of the population were below the poverty line, including 9.1% of those under age 18 and 10.0% of those age 65 or over.

=== Ethnic groups ===
In 1992 Lyn Mautner of The New York Times stated that "Kearny is a mix of many peoples and cultures". Jill P. Capuzo, writing for the same newspaper, described Kearney in 2017 as "Ethnically Diverse".

Kearny became known as "Little Scotland" when immigrants came to work at two mills created by Clark Thread Company in 1875. The company originated from Paisley, Renfrewshire. Nairn Linoleum, another Scottish firm, had also established facilities in Kearny, and there were also Irish immigrants who came to Kearny. In 1992, Mautner stated, according to people in town who were older, the percentage of people of Scottish origin had decreased from about 66% to 10%. According to Mautner, that year there was still a significant "Scottish presence".

By 1992 there had been populations of Portuguese and Asian descent who were established. By 1992 over 1,500 people in Kearney were of Asian ancestry, compared to around 340 circa 1982.

Capuzzo discussed multiple ethnic celebrations and events that occur in Kearny. During the St. Patrick's Day holiday, there is an Irish parade in town. A festival celebrating Peruvian Independence, as well as Portugal Day, are celebrated in Kearny. In 2017, Portuguese Cultural Association had dinner events each week.

== Economy ==
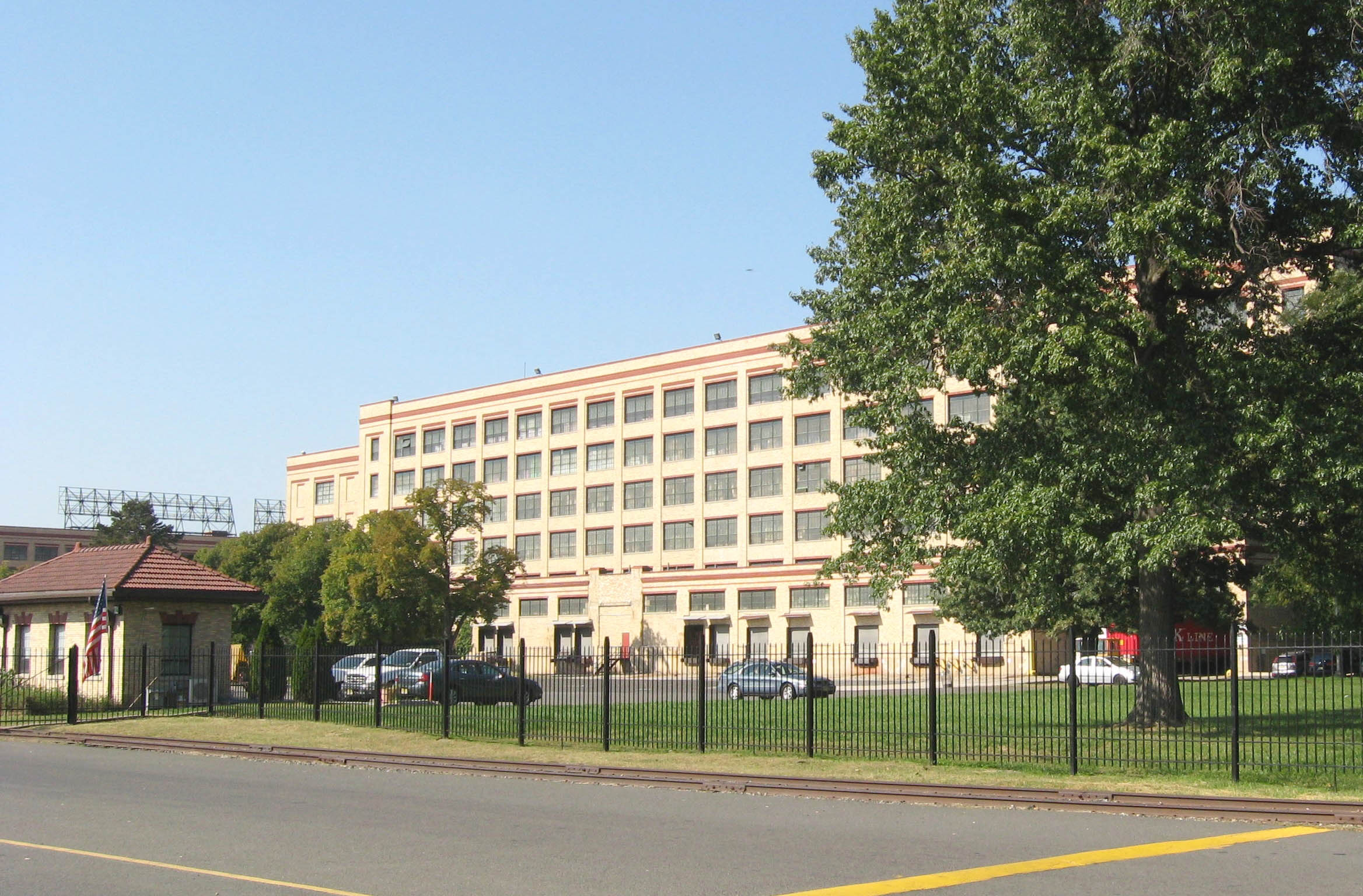
Former Western Electric Kearny Works

In 1982, the Kearny Works plant was assessed for property tax purposes at $23.9 million and represented about 7.3 percent of the towns' total tax base. The real estate taxes for the plant were $1.6 million but a closure was upcoming for 1983. According to Mayor Hill, Western Electric was one of the largest taxpayers for the town. The company filed a tax appeal with the town in December 1982 and agreement was reached to reduce the assessment to between $17 million and $18 million for 1983. With the closures evident, the officials needed to offset the $1.6 million loss by drawing new industry to Kearny with incentives.

Portions of the town are part of an Urban Enterprise Zone (UEZ), one of 32 zones covering 37 municipalities statewide. Kearny was selected in 1983 as one of the initial group of 10 zones chosen to participate in the program. In addition to other benefits to encourage employment and investment within the Zone, shoppers can take advantage of a reduced 3.3125% sales tax rate (half of the 6 5/8% rate charged statewide) at eligible merchants. Established in November 1992, the town's Urban Enterprise Zone status expires in November 2023. Since its inception, there has been $27 million in tax revenue that has been invested based on revenue from the Urban Enterprise Zone.

== Arts and culture ==
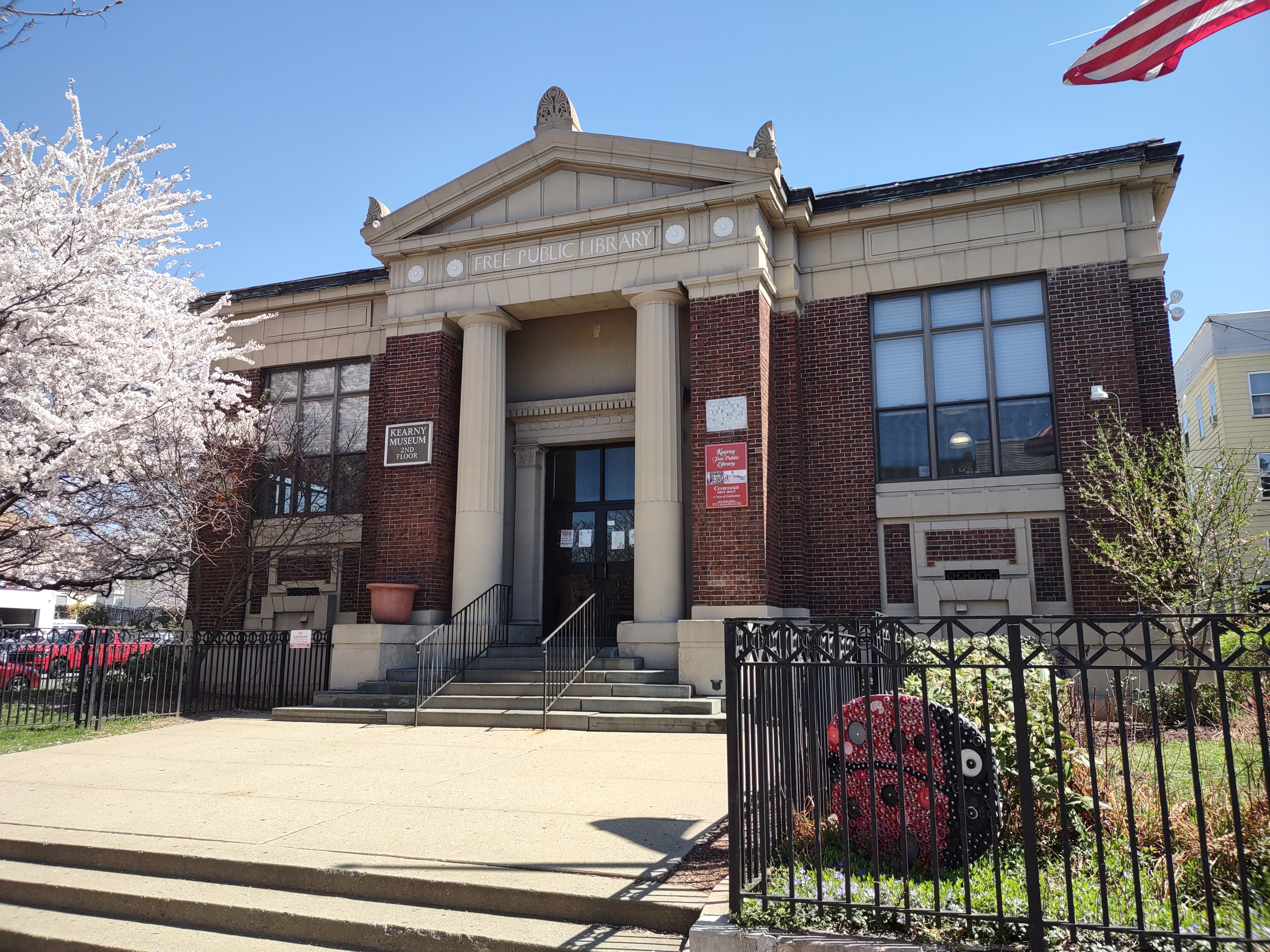
Library

The Kearny Public Library is one of New Jersey's remaining Carnegie libraries, and houses a museum on its third floor which mounts exhibitions related to the history and culture of the town and has a collection of artifacts related to the town's namesake.

In 2023, the town acquired a former church for $1.5 million, which it intends to convert to a cultural center.

== Government ==
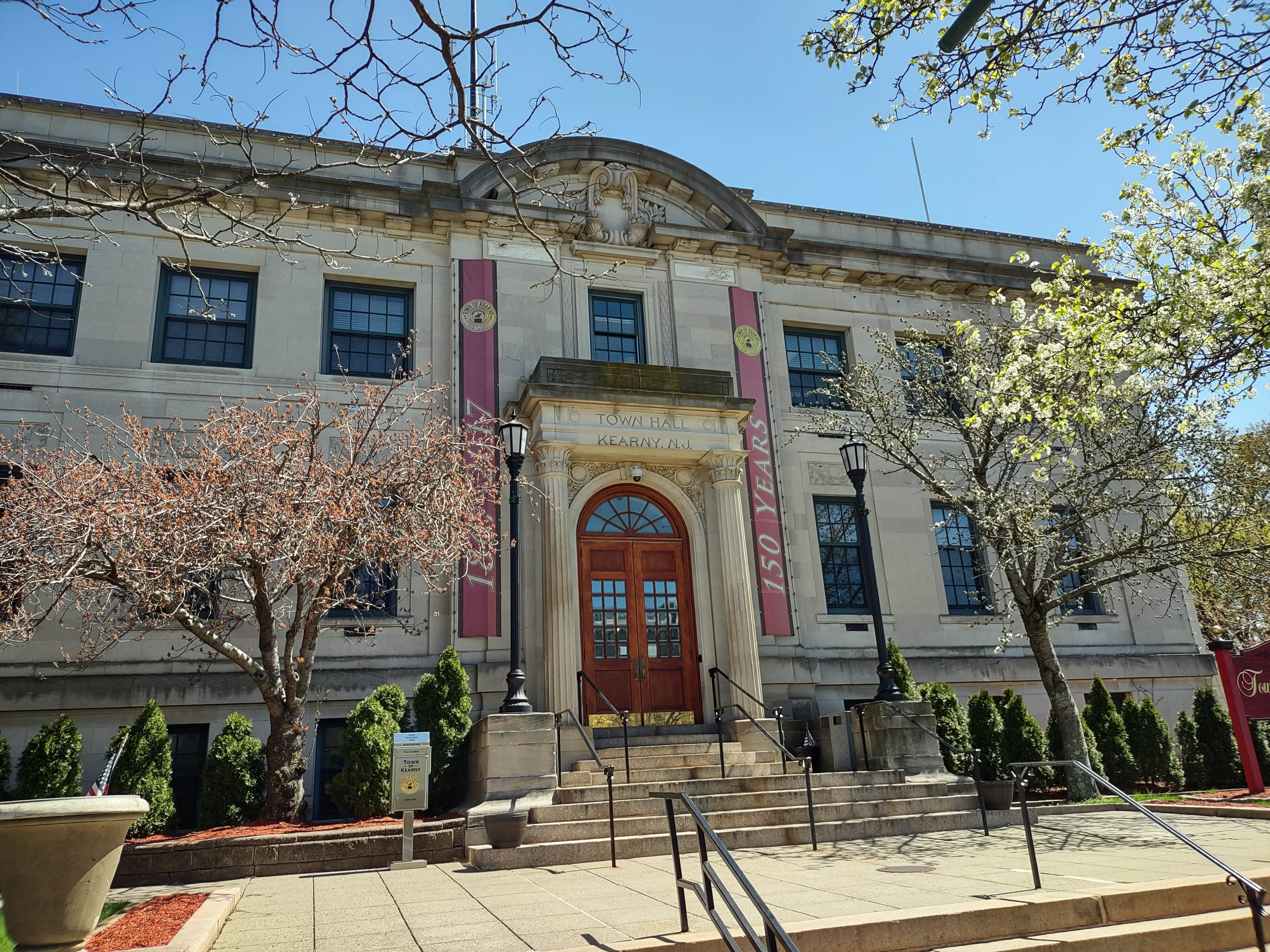
Town Hall

=== Local government ===
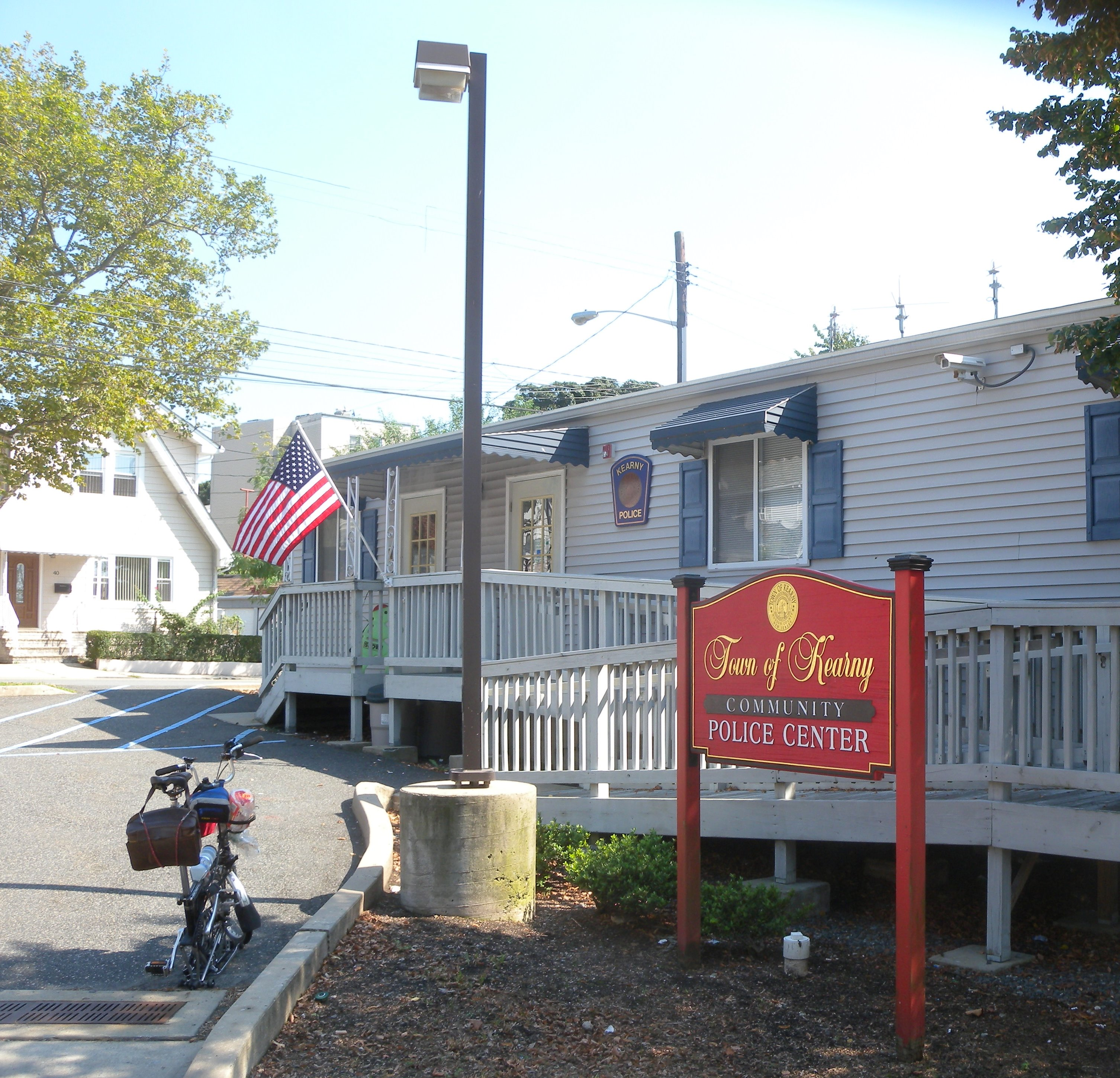
Community Police Center

Kearny is governed under the Town form of New Jersey municipal government. It is one of nine municipalities (of the 564) statewide that use this form of government. The governing body is comprised of the Mayor and Town Council, who are elected on a partisan basis as part of the November general election. The Mayor is elected directly by the voters at-large to a four-year term of office. The Town Council, comprised of eight members, is elected by the voters to four-year terms of office on a staggered basis, with one of the two seats from each of the four wards coming up for election in two consecutive years followed by two years with no elections. The Mayor and Council operate on a legislative basis, with the Mayor having veto power. The day-to-day operations are the responsibility of the Town Administrator whose duties are specified by local ordinance, and who generally carries out the policies adopted by the Mayor and Council.

The mayor of Kearny is Independent Carol Jean Doyle, who was elected to serve an unexpired term of office ending December 31, 2025. Members of the Town Council are Members of the Town Council are Renato da Silva (D, 2025; 3rd Ward, elected to serve an unexpired term), Marytrine De Castro (D, 2025; 1st Ward), Eileen Eckel (D, 2026; 3rd Ward), Gerald J. Ficeto (D, 2025; 4th Ward), Richard P. Konopka (D, 2025; 2nd Ward), Dennis Solano (D, 2026; 2nd Ward, elected to serve an unexpired term), Stathis Theodoropoulos (D, 2026; 4th Ward) and George Zapata (D, 2026; 1st Ward).

During the July 11, 2023, council meeting, Peter Santana (Councilman for the 2nd Ward) was appointed Mayor until a special election was held in November 2023. Al Santos, who had been mayor since January 1, 2000, resigned his role on this same date when the New Jersey Senate's Judiciary Committee confirmed his appointment as a Hudson County Superior Court Judge. In the November 2023 general election, Independent candidate Carol Jean Doyle became the first woman to serve the town as mayor after she defeated Democrat Peter Santana and Republican Sydney Ferreira. In December 2023, Renato da Silva was appointed to fill the 3rd Ward seat expiring in 2025 that became vacant when Doyle took office as mayor.

In February 2019, the Town Council appointed Gerald Ficeto to fill the 2nd Ward seat expiring in December 2021 that had been held by Michael D. Landy until he resigned from office in December 2018. in November 2019, Ficeto was elected to serve the balance of the term of office.

On January 7, 2017, 2nd Ward Councilman Jonathan Giordano died, creating a vacancy on the Town Council. In February 2017, Peter Santana was selected unanimously to fill Giordano's seat that expires in December 2018; Santana served on an interim basis until the November 2017 general election, when voters elected him to serve the balance of the term of office.

In February 2015, the Town Council selected Marytrine De Castro, as chosen by the Democratic municipal committee, to fill the vacant First Ward seat expiring in December 2017 that had been held by Alexa Arce until she resigned the previous month. In the November general election, De Castro was elected to serve the balance of the term.

==== Fire department ====
The town is protected by the Kearny Fire Department, which operates out of four fire stations. The current Chief of Department is Steve Dyl. Below is a list of fire station locations and apparatus of the Kearny Fire Department.

Engine company	Ladder company	Special unit	Command unit	Address
Engine 1		Quick Attack Response Vehicle 1 (QRV), Two flood rescue boats (Zodiacs)		47 Davis Avenue
Squad 2 (Rescue Pumper), Engine 6 (spare)	Ladder Tower 2	Rescue 2 (cross staffed)	Car 2 (Deputy Chief)	109 Kearny Avenue
Engine 3, Engine 5 (Spare)	Ladder Tower 1 (Spare)	Service 3 (Utility Truck), Marine 3 (Fireboat)	Car 3 (Safety Officer)	109 Midland Avenue
Engine 4		Foam Unit 1, MPV 4 (Multi Purpose Vehicle), Haz-Mat Decon Trailer		83 John Miller Way

=== Federal, state, and county representation ===
Kearny is split between the 8th and 9th Congressional Districts and is part of New Jersey's 31st state legislative district.

Prior to the 2010 Census, Kearny had been part of the 9th Congressional District and the 13th Congressional District, a change made by the New Jersey Redistricting Commission that took effect in January 2013, based on the results of the November 2012 general elections. In the redistricting that took effect in 2013, 22,572 (about 55%) Kearny residents were placed in the 8th District, with the remaining 18,112 (about 45%) located in the extreme northwest corner of the town placed in the 9th District.

For the 119th United States Congress, New Jersey's 8th congressional district is represented by Rob Menendez (D, Jersey City). For the 119th United States Congress, New Jersey's 9th congressional district is represented by Nellie Pou (D, North Haledon) New Jersey is represented in the United States Senate by Democrats Cory Booker (Newark, term ends 2027) and Andy Kim (Moorestown, term ends 2031).

For the 2026–2027 session, the 31st legislative district of the New Jersey Legislature is represented in the State Senate by Angela V. McKnight (D, Jersey City) and in the General Assembly by William Sampson (D, Bayonne) and Jerry Walker (D, Jersey City).

Hudson County is governed by the directly elected Hudson County Executive and by a Board of County Commissioners, which serves as the county's legislative body. As of 2025, Hudson County's Hudson County Executive is Craig Guy (D, Jersey City), whose term of office expires December 31, 2027. Hudson County's Commissioners are Kenneth Kopacz (D, District 1 - Bayonne and parts of Jersey City; 2026, Bayonne), William O'Dea (D, District 2 - Western Jersey City; 2026, Jersey City), Vice Chair Jerry Walker (D, District 3 - South Eastern Jersey City Yraida Aponte-Lipski (D, District 4 - North Eastern Jersey City; 2026, Jersey City), Chair Anthony L. Romano Jr. (D, District 5 - Hoboken and parts of Jersey City; 2026, Hoboken), Fanny J. Cedeño (D, District 6 - Union City; 2026, Union City), Caridad Rodriguez (D, District 7 - Weehawken, West New York, and Gutenberg; 2026, West New York), Robert Bascelice (D, District 8 - West New York, North Bergen, Secaucus; 2026, North Bergen) and Albert J. Cifelli (D, District 9 - Secaucus, Kearny, East Newark, Harrison; 2026, Harrison)

Hudson County's constitutional officers are County Clerk E. Junior Maldonado (D, Jersey City, 2027), Register Jeffrey Dublin (D, Jersey City, 2026) Sheriff Frank X. Schillari (R, Jersey City, 2025) and Surrogate Tilo E. Rivas (D, Jersey City, 2029)

=== Politics ===
As of March 2011, there were a total of 16,348 registered voters in Kearny, of which 7,030 (43.0%) were registered as Democrats, 1,922 (11.8%) were registered as Republicans and 7,390 (45.2%) were registered as Unaffiliated. There were 6 voters registered to other parties.

Gubernatorial election results for Kearny
Year	Republican		Democratic		Third party(ies)	
Year	No.	%	No.	%	No.	%
2025	3,383	36.66%	5,740	62.20%	105	1.14%
2021	2,701	43.72%	3,431	55.54%	46	0.74%
2017	1,569	30.98%	3,382	66.79%	113	2.23%
2013	2,634	48.84%	2,667	49.45%	92	1.71%
2009	2,790	39.31%	3,838	54.07%	470	6.62%
2005	2,212	32.70%	4,308	63.68%	245	3.62%

In the 2012 presidential election, Democrat Barack Obama received 68.9% of the vote (7,579 cast), ahead of Republican Mitt Romney with 29.9% (3,293 votes), and other candidates with 1.2% (129 votes), among the 11,076 ballots cast by the town's 17,601 registered voters (75 ballots were spoiled), for a turnout of 62.9%. In the 2008 presidential election, Democrat Barack Obama received 60.4% of the vote (6,953 cast), ahead of Republican John McCain with 37.9% (4,365 votes) and other candidates with 1.1% (121 votes), among the 11,508 ballots cast by the town's 18,057 registered voters, for a turnout of 63.7%. In the 2004 presidential election, Democrat John Kerry received 57.0% of the vote (6,363 ballots cast), outpolling Republican George W. Bush with 41.7% (4,650 votes) and other candidates with 0.5% (87 votes), among the 11,154 ballots cast by the town's 16,633 registered voters, for a turnout percentage of 67.1.

Presidential Elections Results
Year	Republican	Democratic	Third Parties
2024	49.5% 6,528	47.9% 6,226	2.6% 305
2020	37.8% 5,477	59.4% 8,594	2.8% 153
2016	33.8% 3,922	62.4% 7,251	3.4% 394
2012	29.9% 3,293	68.9% 7,579	1.2% 129
2008	37.9% 4,365	60.4% 6,953	1.1% 121
2004	41.7% 4,650	57.0% 6,363	0.5% 87

In the 2013 gubernatorial election, Democrat Barbara Buono received 49.5% of the vote (2,667 cast), ahead of Republican Chris Christie with 48.8% (2,634 votes), and other candidates with 1.7% (92 votes), among the 5,597 ballots cast by the town's 18,001 registered voters (204 ballots were spoiled), for a turnout of 31.1%. In the 2009 gubernatorial election, Democrat Jon Corzine received 52.9% of the vote (3,838 ballots cast), ahead of Republican Chris Christie with 38.5% (2,790 votes), Independent Chris Daggett with 5.4% (390 votes) and other candidates with 1.1% (80 votes), among the 7,249 ballots cast by the town's 16,417 registered voters, yielding a 44.2% turnout.

United States Senate election results for Kearny1
Year	Republican		Democratic		Third party(ies)	
Year	No.	%	No.	%	No.	%
2024	5,001	44.30%	5,846	51.78%	443	3.92%
2018	2,871	33.39%	5,432	63.18%	295	3.43%
2012	2,559	27.00%	6,706	70.75%	214	2.26%
2006	2,271	35.51%	3,959	61.91%	165	2.58%

United States Senate election results for Kearny2
Year	Republican		Democratic		Third party(ies)	
Year	No.	%	No.	%	No.	%
2020	4,562	33.71%	8,418	62.20%	553	4.09%
2014	1,410	34.99%	2,536	62.93%	84	2.08%
2013	1,168	36.53%	1,983	62.03%	46	1.44%
2008	3,185	34.20%	5,849	62.80%	279	3.00%

== Education ==
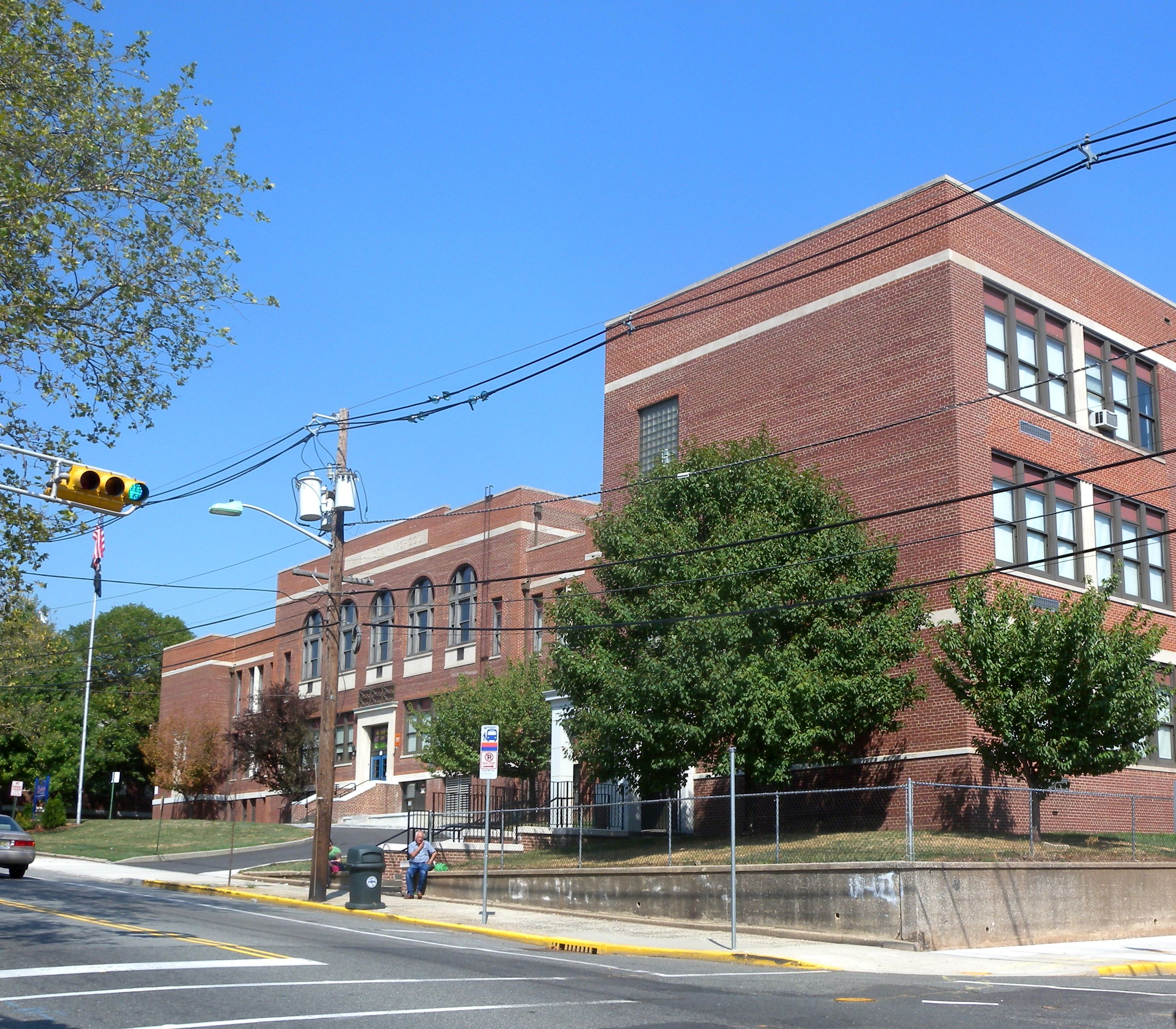
Washington Elementary School

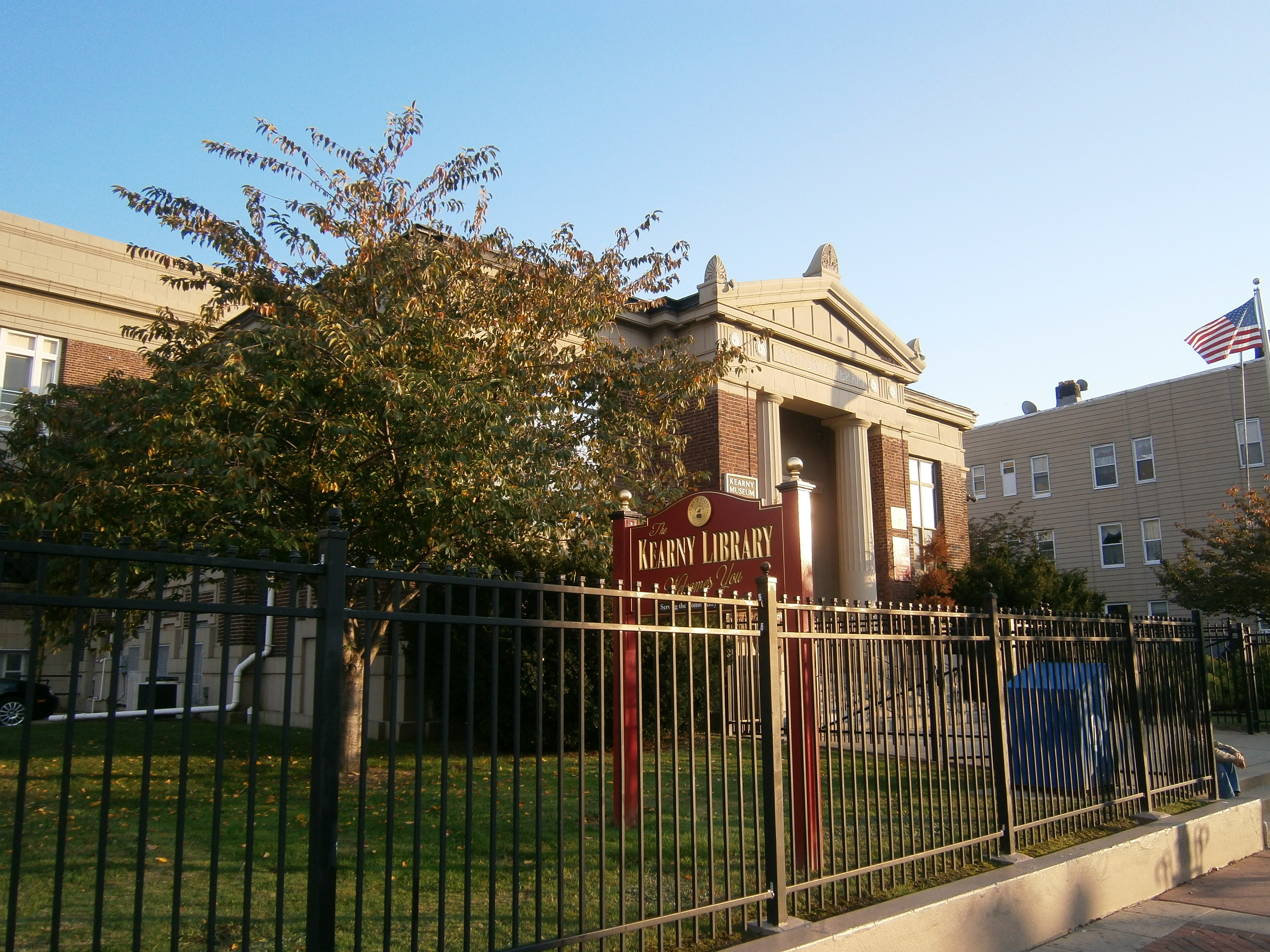
Kearny Library and Museum

=== Public schools ===
The Kearny School District serves public school students in pre-kindergarten through twelfth grade. As of the 2021–22 school year, the district, comprised of seven schools, had an enrollment of 5,142 students and 455.7 classroom teachers (on an FTE basis), for a student–teacher ratio of 11.3:1. Schools in the district (with 2021–22 enrollment data from the National Center for Education Statistics) are Franklin Elementary School with 842 students in grades PreK-6, Garfield Elementary School with 439 students in grades PreK-6, Roosevelt Elementary School with 385 students in grades PreK-6, Schuyler Elementary School with 410 students in grades PreK-6, Washington Elementary School with 474 students in grades PreK-6, Lincoln Middle School with 752 students in grades 7-8 and Kearny High School with 1,742 students in grades 9-12.

==== Charter schools ====
Kearny also includes Hudson Arts and Science Charter School, a charter school that operates as part of iLearn Schools, based in Elmwood Park. HASCS has two campuses, an elementary and middle school. The elementary school is located at 131 Midland Avenue (formerly Mater Dei Academy) and the middle school is located at 114 Chestnut Street (formerly Mount Carmel Guild High School). HASCS Elementary serves grades K-3 and HASCS Middle serves grades 4-8. The two schools have a combined total of 815 students.

=== Private schools ===
Schools in Kearny include:

- Kearny Christian Academy, a Christian school founded in 1981 by the City of Hope International Church that serves students in kindergarten through twelfth grade.
- Mt. Carmel Guild School (now the site of Hudson Arts and Science Charter School - Middle)
- The Little Neighborhood Learning Center
- Happy Time Preschool & Day Care

In the face of declining enrollment, the Roman Catholic Archdiocese of Newark closed Mater Dei Academy at the conclusion of the 2011–2012 school year. Mater Dei had been opened three years earlier as the merger of two existing schools, St. Stephen's and Holy Cross (the latter in Harrison), but attendance declined from 250 in its first year to 170 in its final year. Other former Catholic schools in Kearny include: Sacred Heart School and St. Cecilia School.

== Transportation ==
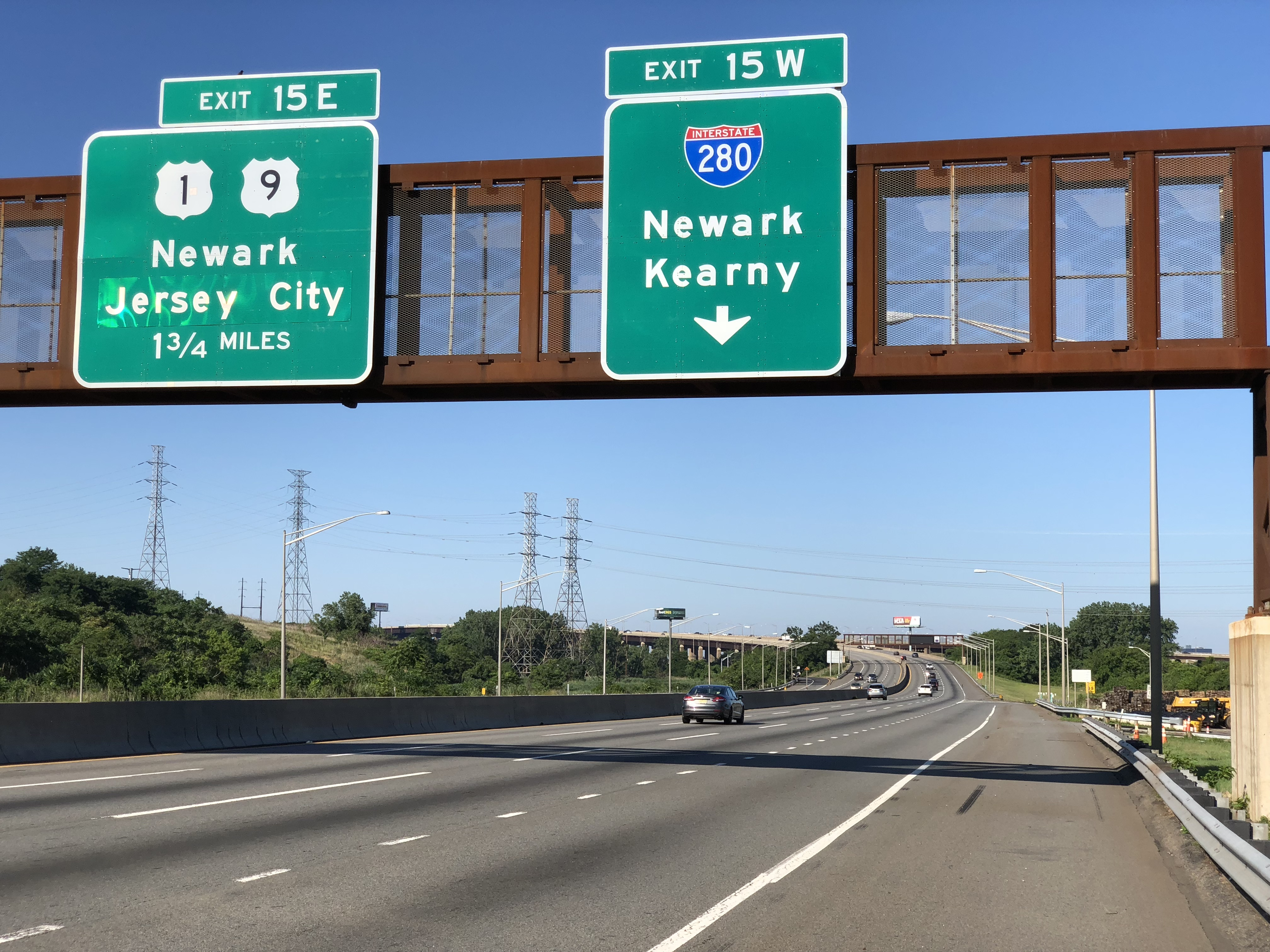
The southbound New Jersey Turnpike (Interstate 95) in Kearny

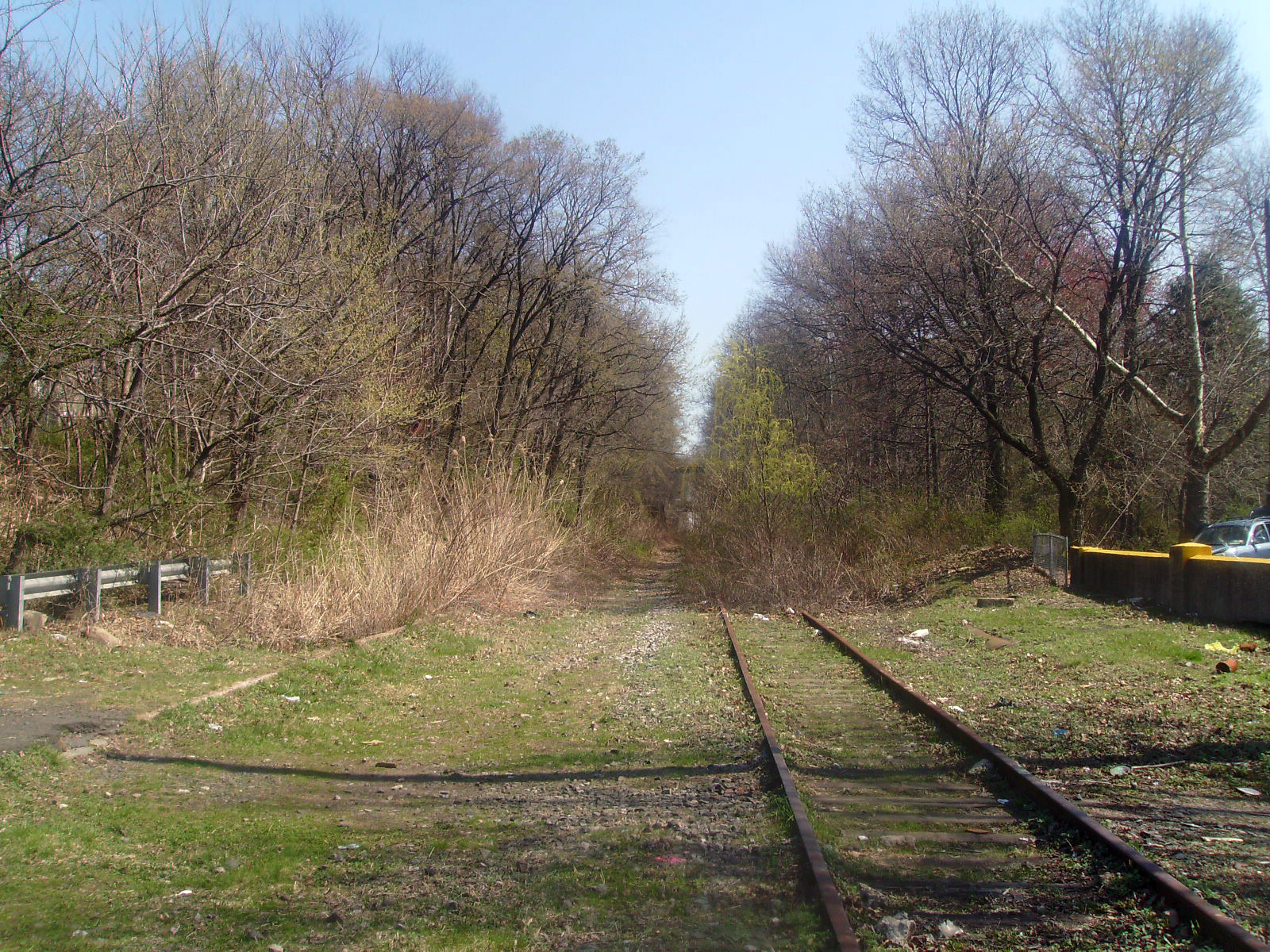
Former West Arlington Station

=== Roads and highways ===
As of May 2010, the town had a total of 70.89 miles (114.09 km) of roadways, of which 50.75 miles (81.67 km) were maintained by the municipality, 7.30 miles (11.75 km) by Hudson County, 7.73 miles (12.44 km) by the New Jersey Department of Transportation and 5.11 miles (8.22 km) by the New Jersey Turnpike Authority.

Several roadways pass through and intersect in the town. The Belleville Turnpike (Route 7) forms the northern border of the town with North Arlington and crosses the Rutgers Street Bridge over the Passaic River into Belleville. Kearny Avenue passes through the town and continues north as Ridge Road, the beginning of Route 17. U.S. Route 1/9 (Pulaski Skyway) and US 1/9 Truck pass through. The Essex Freeway (Interstate 280) passes through the town and ends at Interstate 95 (the New Jersey Turnpike eastern and western spurs) at the tollgate for Exit 15W.

=== Public transportation ===
NJ Transit offers bus service to the Port Authority Bus Terminal in Midtown Manhattan and to other New Jersey communities. Bus service to Newark is available on the 1, 30, 40, and 76 routes.

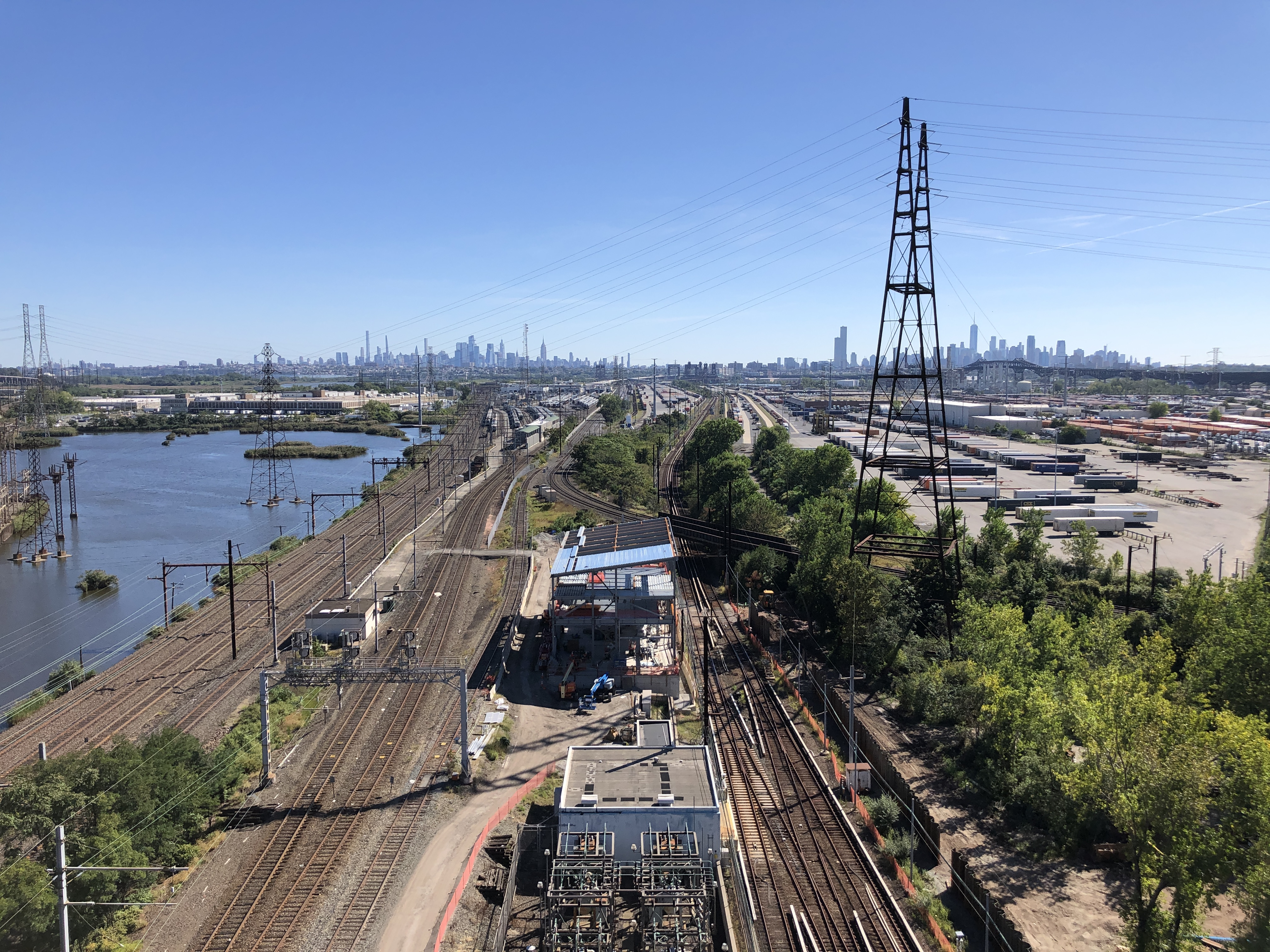
The NJ Transit Meadows Maintenance Complex in Kearny

Kearny was formerly served by trains of both the Erie Railroad's Newark Branch (later Erie-Lackawanna and then Conrail's Newark Industrial Branch) and its Greenwood Lake Division (later the Erie-Lackawanna's Greenwood Lake-Boonton Line; and Conrail and New Jersey Transit's Boonton Line) which stopped at the now-abandoned Arlington station. Newark Branch passenger service was terminated in October 1966. But freight service continued until 2005, when the last remaining shipper, Spar-Tech PolyCom, shut down. However, freight service on the Newark side is still active. New Jersey Transit discontinued Boonton Line service in 2002 when the Montclair Connection was opened. Through the early 1970s trains also stopped at a second station along this route known as West Arlington. This station was just to the east of the now abandoned WR Draw movable bridge. Prior to April 30, 1967, a station in South Kearny, was served by the Central Railroad of New Jersey's Newark and New York Branch via the PD Draw over the Passaic River. This station was popular with employees of the giant Western Electric plant, and other industries in the area. In the final years of this service a pair of rush hour trains ran in each direction between South Kearny, and the CNJ's Broad Street Station in downtown Newark, as well as a single rush hour round trip between South Kearny, and Plainfield. This train operated via Elizabethport, and the CNJ main line. Kearny is also the location of the Meadows Maintenance Complex, the primary maintenance facility for NJ Transit rail operations.

The closest airport with scheduled passenger service is Newark Liberty International Airport, located 6.5 miles (10.5 km) away in Newark and Elizabeth.

== Notable people ==
People who were born in, residents of, or otherwise closely associated with Kearny include:

- Tomasz Adamek (born 1976), Polish professional heavyweight boxer who is the former WBC Light Heavyweight Champion and the former IBF & IBO & The Ring Cruiserweight Champion
- Karen Akunowicz (born 1978), award-winning chef, Top Chef contestant
- Marcello Borges (born 1997), soccer player
- Rachel Breton (born 1990), soccer striker and defender who played for Sky Blue FC and New Jersey Wildcats
- Davey Brown (1898–1970), soccer player and National Soccer Hall of Fame inductee
- Marques Brownlee (born 1993), YouTube personality who reviews technology
- John F. Cali (1928–1992), politician who served three terms in the New Jersey General Assembly, representing the 30th Legislative District from 1974 to 1980
- Guy W. Calissi (c. 1909–1980), New Jersey Superior Court judge who lived in an orphanage here
- Gary Michael Cappetta (born 1952), professional wrestling ring announcer, author, voice over artist, screenwriter and stage performer
- Jacob Cardenas (born 2001) freestyle and folkstyle wrestler
- Ownie Carroll (1902–1975), Major League Baseball pitcher who played nine seasons in the major, from 1925 to 1934
- Jennifer Dore (born 1971), rower who competed in women's quadruple sculls at the 2000 Summer Olympics
- George Dunlap (1908–2003), golfer best known for winning the United States Amateur Championship in 1933
- James Ford (born 1889), soccer outside right who earned one cap with the U.S. national team in 1916
- Santiago Formoso (born 1953), soccer defender who played five seasons in the North American Soccer League
- James Gallagher (1909–1992), soccer player who earned two caps with the United States national soccer team
- Franco Gamero (born 1990), international footballer who has played for the Puerto Rico national football team
- Ted Gillen (born 1968), former professional soccer player
- Albert Gonzalez (born 1981), government informant and computer criminal
- Ed Halicki (born 1950), former professional baseball pitcher with a no-hitter to his credit, pitched on August 24, 1975, against the New York Mets
- John Harkes (born 1967), professional soccer player
- Al Hartley (1921–2003), comic book writer-artist known for his work on Archie Comics
- Fred A. Hartley Jr. (1902–1969), New Jersey Congressman best known for being the House of Representatives sponsor of the Taft-Hartley Act
- Herbie Haymer (1916–1949), jazz saxophonist
- John Hemingsley, soccer center forward who played the first two U.S. national team games in 1916
- Frank Iero (born 1981), rhythm guitarist and backup vocalist for My Chemical Romance
- James F. Kelley (1902–1996), President of Seton Hall College (since renamed as Seton Hall University) from 1936 to 1949
- Jeffrey Klepacki (born 1968), three-time US Olympian in rowing and three-time world champion
- Buzz Kulik (1922–1999), film director and producer
- Joe Kyrillos (born 1960), politician who served in the New Jersey Senate from 1992 to 2018, where he represents the 13th Legislative District
- Joan Lippincott (1935–2025), concert organist
- Monroe Jay Lustbader (1931–1996), politician who served in the New Jersey General Assembly from 1992 until his death, where he represented the 21st Legislative District
- Kevin Maguire (born 1960), comic book artist
- Meagan McClelland (born 2000), professional soccer goalkeeper for USL Super League club Carolina Ascent FC
- Paul McCurrie (1929–2020), lawyer and politician who served in the New Jersey General Assembly
- Tony Meola (born 1969), professional soccer player
- Dots Miller (1886–1923), Major League Baseball player from 1909 to 1921
- Michael Moran (born 1962), author / analyst of international affairs and digital documentarian
- Tony Mottola (1918–2004), jazz guitarist
- Jim Murphy (1947–2022), author of nonfiction and fiction books for children, young adults, and general audiences, including more than 30 about American history
- Shamus O'Brien (1907–1981), soccer player inducted in 1990 into the National Soccer Hall of Fame
- Brian O'Hara (born 1979), law enforcement official who is serving as the 54th Chief of the Minneapolis Police Department
- Hugh O'Neill (born 1954), soccer player who played in the NASL, ASL, and MISL
- Greg Pason (born 1966), National Secretary of the Socialist Party USA
- George Paxton (c. 1914–1989), big band jazz leader, saxophonist, composer and producer
- Bill Raftery (born 1943), college basketball analyst and former college basketball player for La Salle University
- Tab Ramos (born 1966), retired soccer midfielder
- James H. Rupp (1918–1998), Illinois state senator, Mayor of Monmouth, Illinois, and businessman
- Rose Grundfest Schneider (1908–2003), medical researcher, hematologist, geneticist and educator
- Harold Hill Smith (1910–1994), geneticist who first fused a human cell and a plant cell
- Bob Stanley (born 1954), professional baseball relief pitcher who played for the Boston Red Sox
- Archie Stark (1897–1985), soccer pioneer in the United States and member of the National Soccer Hall of Fame
- Ray Toro (born 1977), My Chemical Romance lead guitarist
- John Patrick Washington (1908–1943), Roman Catholic priest; one of the Four Chaplains, who gave their lives to save other soldiers during the sinking of the troop transport Dorchester during World War II
- Alex Webster (1931–2012), fullback and halfback in the NFL for the New York Giants, who was later head coach of the Giants
- Dick Weisgerber (1915–1984), professional football player for the Green Bay Packers
- Kenneth G. Wiman (1930–2021), U.S. Coast Guard Rear Admiral
