= McDonalds Brook =

Tributary of the Passaic River

Coordinates: 40°50′35″N 74°07′54.5″W

McDanald's Brook is a tributary of the Passaic River. It is a natural stream originating in Clifton, New Jersey, passing through Passaic, New Jersey. For most of its length, it runs underground in a culvert constructed by the United States Army Corps of Engineers. Prior to the construction of the culvert, larger parts of it ran through a ground-level stream bed, though parts of it ran underground even in its natural configuration.

The brook, throughout its length, is used as a catchment for storm drain by the cities of Clifton and Passaic. Parts of Clifton's combined storm/sewer lines run adjacent, and when they overflow or have breakages, feed additional stormwater or raw sewage into the brook.

In the past, Clifton industry took advantage of the brook for wastewater dumping, mostly illegally.

The brook runs through Passaic's Third Ward Veterans Memorial Park, constructed in the 1930s as part of the Works Project Administration (WPA). At the time of the park's construction, the brook's path was altered slightly, and a small lake bed was dug in the center of the park, creating a pond fed by the brook. The pond was open to fishing and boating until the detection of industrial pollution. Although not well known, the pond is officially named Hughes Lake.

Presently, the park contains the only exposed portion of the brook. The culvert ends at the westernmost tip of the park, near the Broadway entrance, at the end of the playground. The brook then flows along the border of the playground, and then runs roughly parallel to The Circle, the road bordering the park, until it reaches Hughes Lake. At the opposite end of the lake is a man-made dam and waterfall, where the brook continues, running underground again briefly to cross Passaic Avenue. On the other side of the avenue, it runs next to the ballfield and tennis court, before being concealed again to cross Howard Avenue, Pennington Avenue, Benson Court, and the New Jersey Transit railroad trestle. It runs in the open through an undeveloped portion of the park between Pennington and High Street, ducks under High, and runs across the edge of the playground that is at the eastern terminus of the park. It then continues in another culvert for the remainder of its length, until it meets the Passaic River near the foot of Brook Avenue.

The brook was originally known as Mineral Spring Brook, when a resort business was attempted near the current start of the exposed part of the brook. A surveyor incorrectly labeled it McDonald's Brook, and variations of that name became the common name, and now the official name. Mineral Spring Avenue runs perpendicular to the brook near the site of the former resort, and the name of the street may actually be a remnant of the original name and the resort that tried to put the brook to medicinal use. Bloomfield Avenue, parts of it now renamed Broadway, was originally built on February 1, 1803, to provide access to the spring resort.

In addition to Hughes Lake, two other ponds were found along the brook's path downstream, after it crossed Main Avenue (known then as Franklin Avenue). The ponds have since been lost to development, and the entire stream is buried along this length. Both ponds were along Brook Ave, on its south side. The first was at Park Avenue (east side of Park), and the other was midway between Gold Street and River Road. Though Gold Street itself no longer exists at Brook, a portion of it remains at Terhune, and its old location can be determined via a straight line.

In a late 20th-century rehabilitation of the park, the brook was rerouted again. Much of the new bed eroded to the sides.
