= Afro Beat Fest =

Annual festival of African culture held in Newark, New Jersey, United States

- Genre: Pan-African culture, West African culture, Afrobeat, Afrobeats
- Date(s): Mid-July
- Frequency: Annual
- Venue: Military Park
- Location(s): Newark, New Jersey
- Founded: 1988 (as Africa Newark Street Festival); 2017 (as Afro Beat Fest
- Founders: Maxwell Kofi Jumah, Barbara King
- Participants: Families, musicians, dancers, artists, designers, food vendors, crafts vendors
- Website: https://afrobeatfestnewark.com

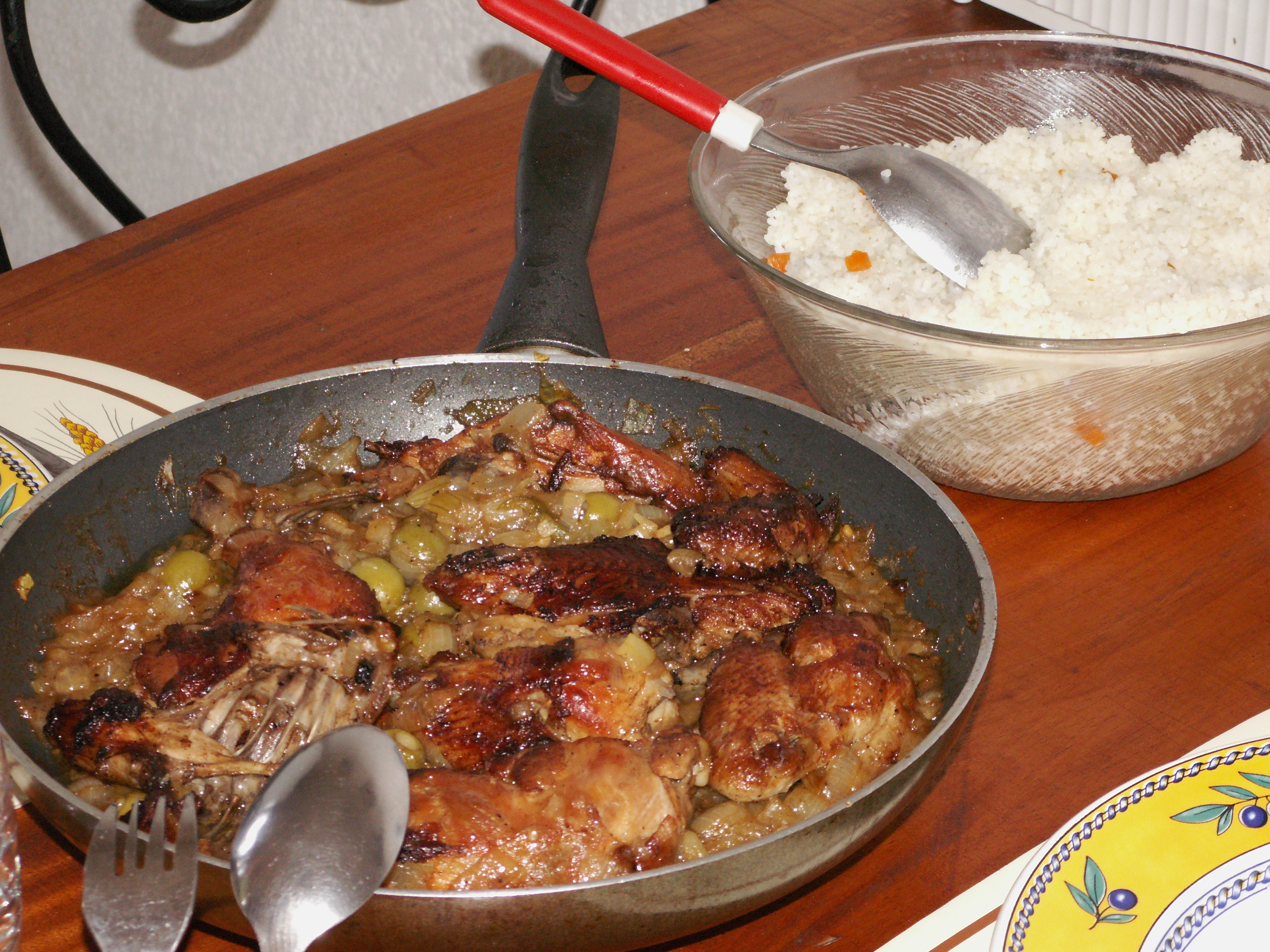
Senegalese yassa poulet, a tangy-spicy dish enjoyed throughout the West African region, made with Dijon mustard, onions, lemon juice, olives and Scotch bonnet peppers

Afro Beat Fest is an annual family-oriented festival in Newark, New Jersey celebrating African culture and communities including music, art, fashion, dance, crafts and cuisine.

The inaugural Afro Beat Fest was held in Military Park in Downtown Newark in July 2017. Afro Beat Fest is a reboot of an older festival that had begun in the 1980s called "Africa Newark." That incarnation ended in 2006 after it lost city support.

Mayor Ras Baraka commented that he and colleagues recalled the original festival warmly from childhood visits to the event and noted that the city worked with local organizers to revive it.

Grammy-nominated French duo Les Nubians, English-born Nigerian singer/songwriter Ayo Jay, and Ghanaian singer Bisa Kdei have all performed at the festival.
