= Military Park =

Military Park may refer to:

- Military Park (Indianapolis), a U.S. Historic district in Indianapolis, Indiana
- Military Park (Newark), a U.S. Historic district in Newark, New Jersey
- Military Park (NLR station), an underground station of the Newark Light Rail of the Newark Light Rail
- National Military Park, sites preserved by the United States federal government because of their national importance
- Military Park (Taiwan), a military park in Xinyi District, Keelung City, Taiwan
