= Robert Treat Center =

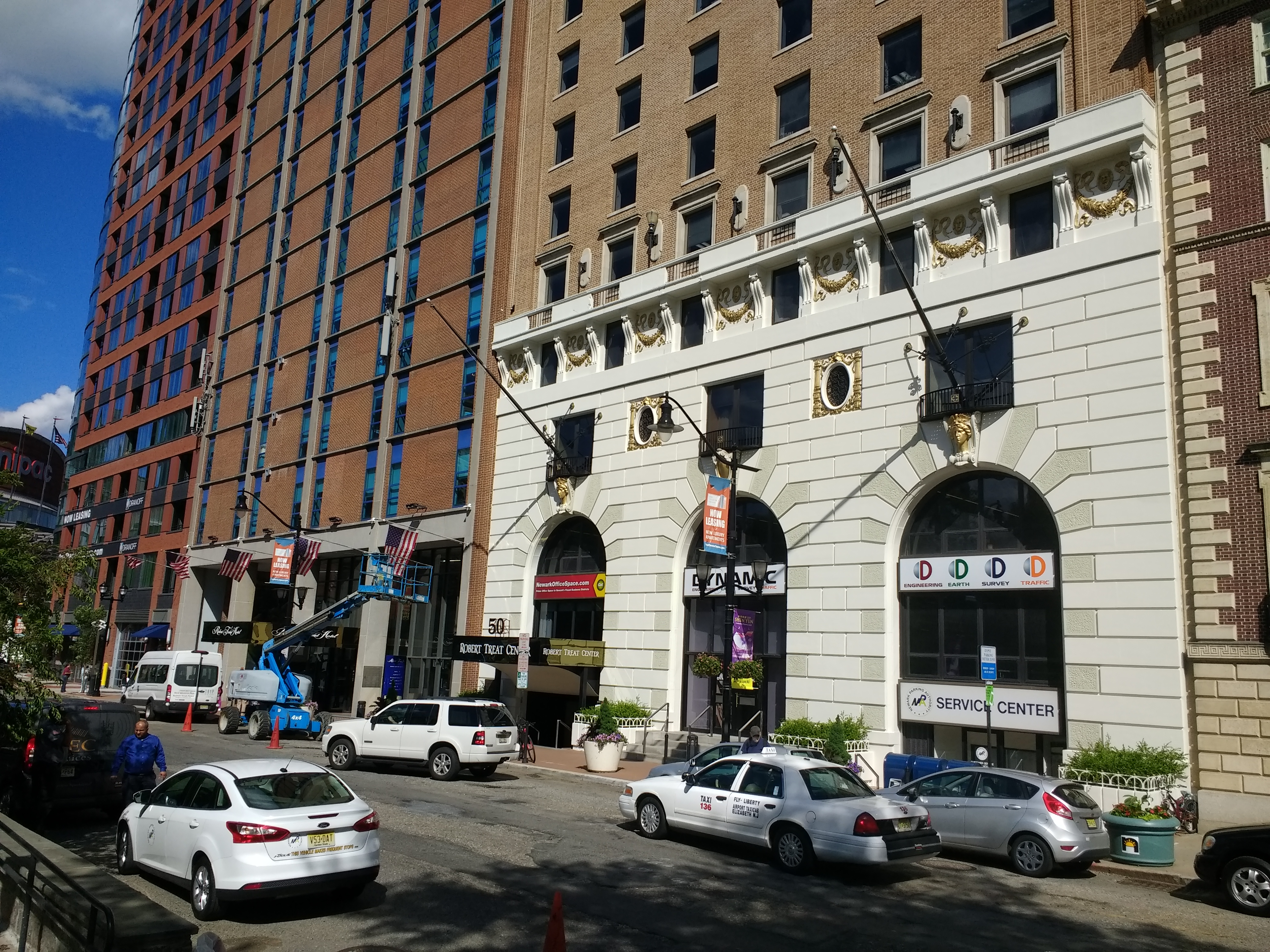
- Interactive map of the Robert Treat Center area

General information
- Type: Office/Hotel
- Location: 50 Park Place; Newark, New Jersey
- Coordinates: 40.7390°N 74.1685°W
- Completed: 1916 & 1964
- Owner: Berger Organization

Height
- Roof: 50.29 m (165.0 ft)

Technical details
- Floor count: 14

Design and construction
- Architect: Guilbert and Betelle

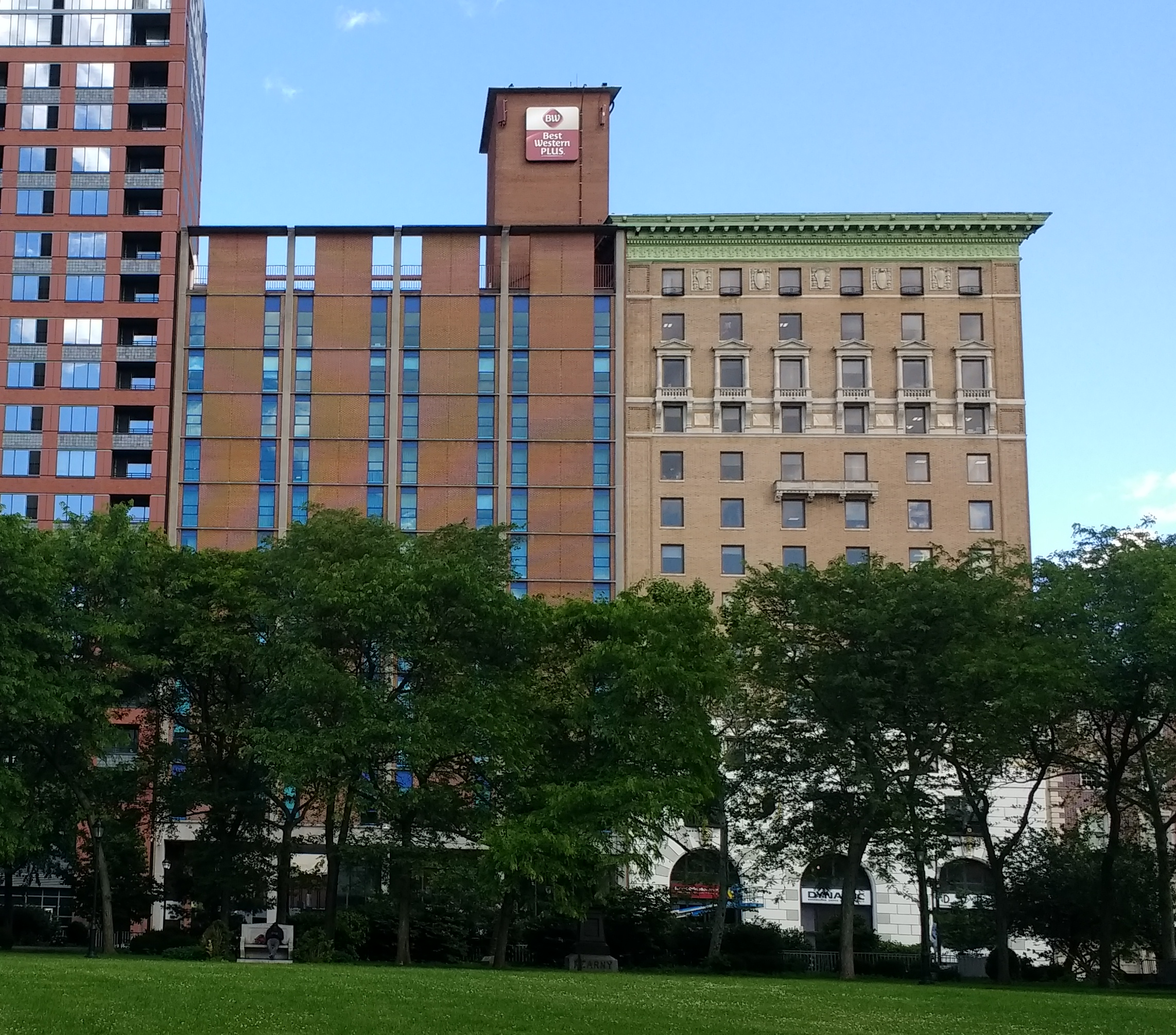
Robert Treat Center

The Robert Treat Center is an office and hotel complex in Newark, New Jersey, United States. It is named for Robert Treat, who founded the city in 1666. One building originally opened as the Robert Treat Hotel in 1916. The landmark was later converted to an office building after the construction of a newer hotel next to it. The adjacent buildings are located at Military Park near the New Jersey Performing Arts Center, One Theater Square and New Jersey Historical Society.

A portrait of Robert Treat was prominently placed over the fireplace mantle.

In 1933, the Hotel was operated by Niagara Falls businessman Frank A. Dudley and the United Hotels Company.

The building was purchased in 1987 by The Berger Organization, which has also renovated some of the city's other commercial landmarks, such as the Firemen's Insurance Company Home Office Building and Military Park Building. They sold the Griffith Building, which they had intended to renovate, in 2018.

== See also ==
- List of tallest buildings in Newark
- One Theater Square
- Anton Kaufman
