= Downtown Newark =

Central business district in United States

Coordinates: 40°44′10″N 74°10′19″W

- Central business district and neighborhood
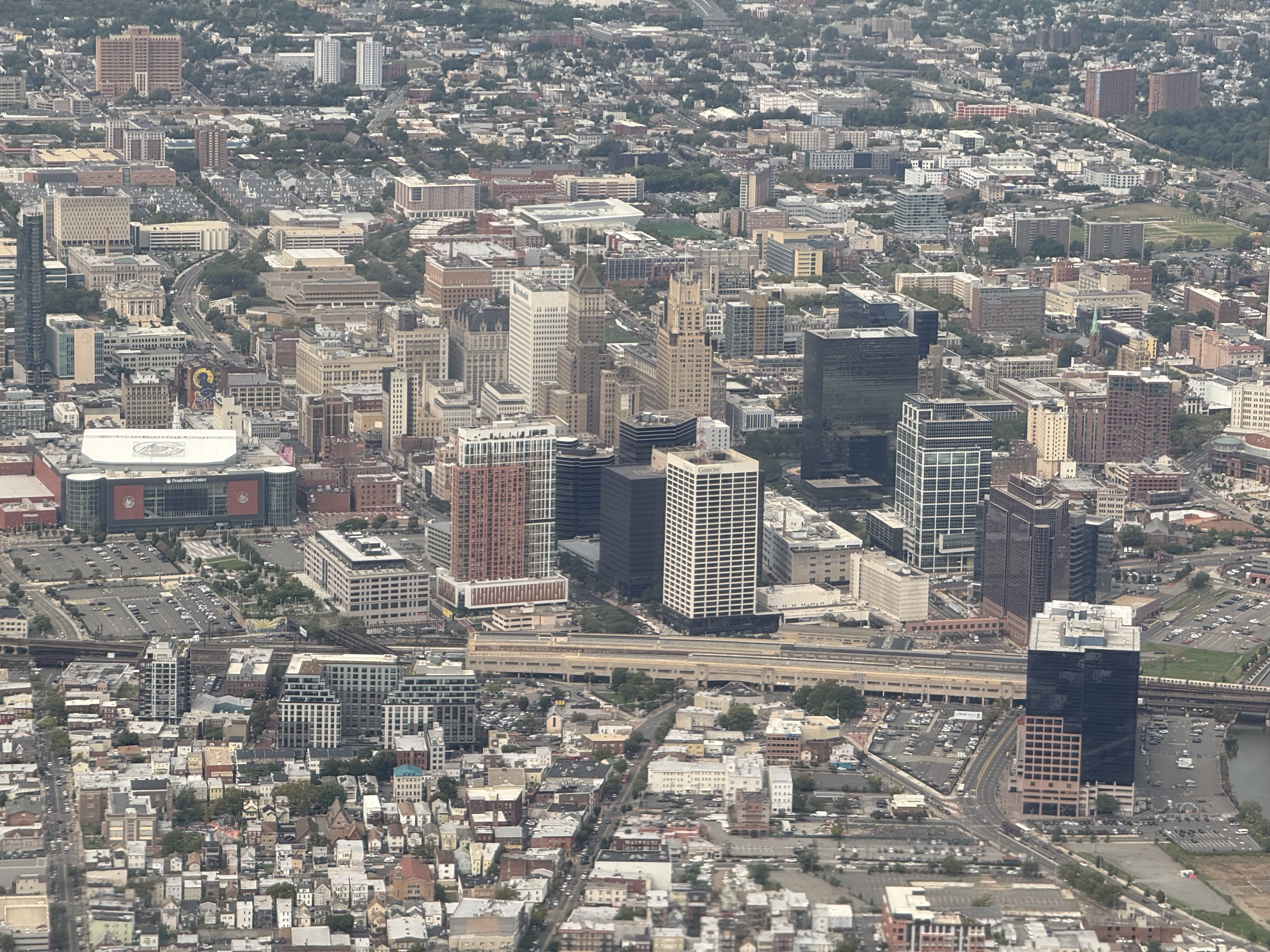
- Aerial view of Downtown Newark in 2025
- Interactive map of Downtown Newark
- Country: United States
- State: New Jersey
- City: Newark
- County: Essex

Population (2020)
  - Total: 13,581
- ZIP Codes: 07102
- Area codes: 862 and 973

Downtown Newark is the central business district of Newark in Essex County, in the U.S. state of New Jersey.

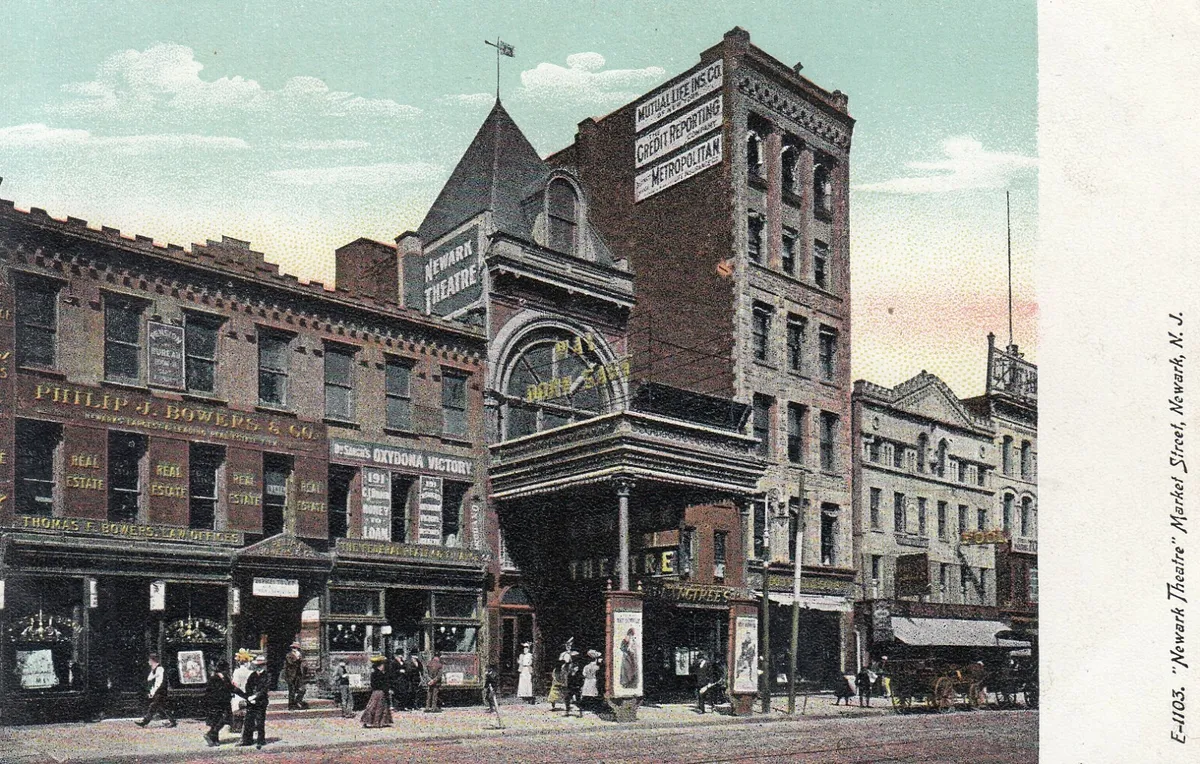
The Newark Paramount Theatre in 1906. It appeared in Joker (2019 film)

Downtown is the site of the original Puritan settlement of Newark located at a bend in the Passaic River. The first settlers, led by Robert Treat, landed not far from the present site of the New Jersey Performing Arts Center. The intersection of Broad and Market Streets, known as the Four Corners was once considered the busiest intersection in the nation, and is the heart of traditional downtown.

Most of Newark's office buildings are located in this area including Prudential Financial's Headquarters (also known as Prudential Plaza) and their new office tower that was recently constructed on Broad Street across from Military Park. In the post-World War II era, downtown seemed to be moving north during the New Newark architectural period, in the direction of Washington Park. Since the 1967 civil unrest, it has been shifting slightly east in the direction of Newark Penn Station, the Gateway Center and the Passaic River. Panasonic constructed their North American HQ building on Raymond Blvd near McCarter Hwy. There are several more new office buildings including One Newark Center, The Legal And Communications Building, The two Penn Plaza office buildings, which are home to NJ Transit and Horizon Blue Cross, the Claremont building on McCarter Hwy, which is office space for the FBI and several other federal agencies, and a few other office buildings. There is also several projects in the design stages for this area.

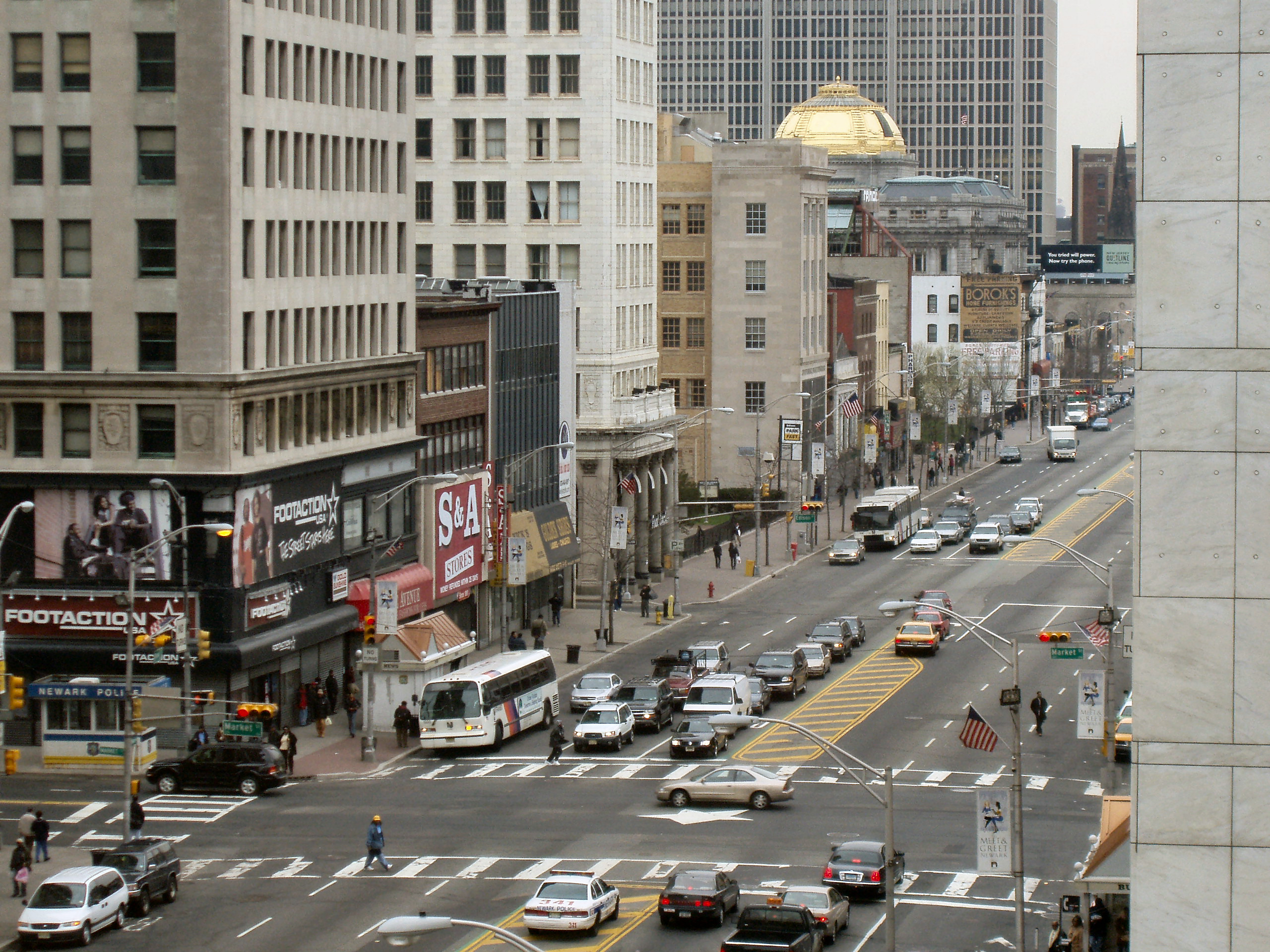
The intersection of Broad and Market Streets, as seen from the Prudential Plaza Building

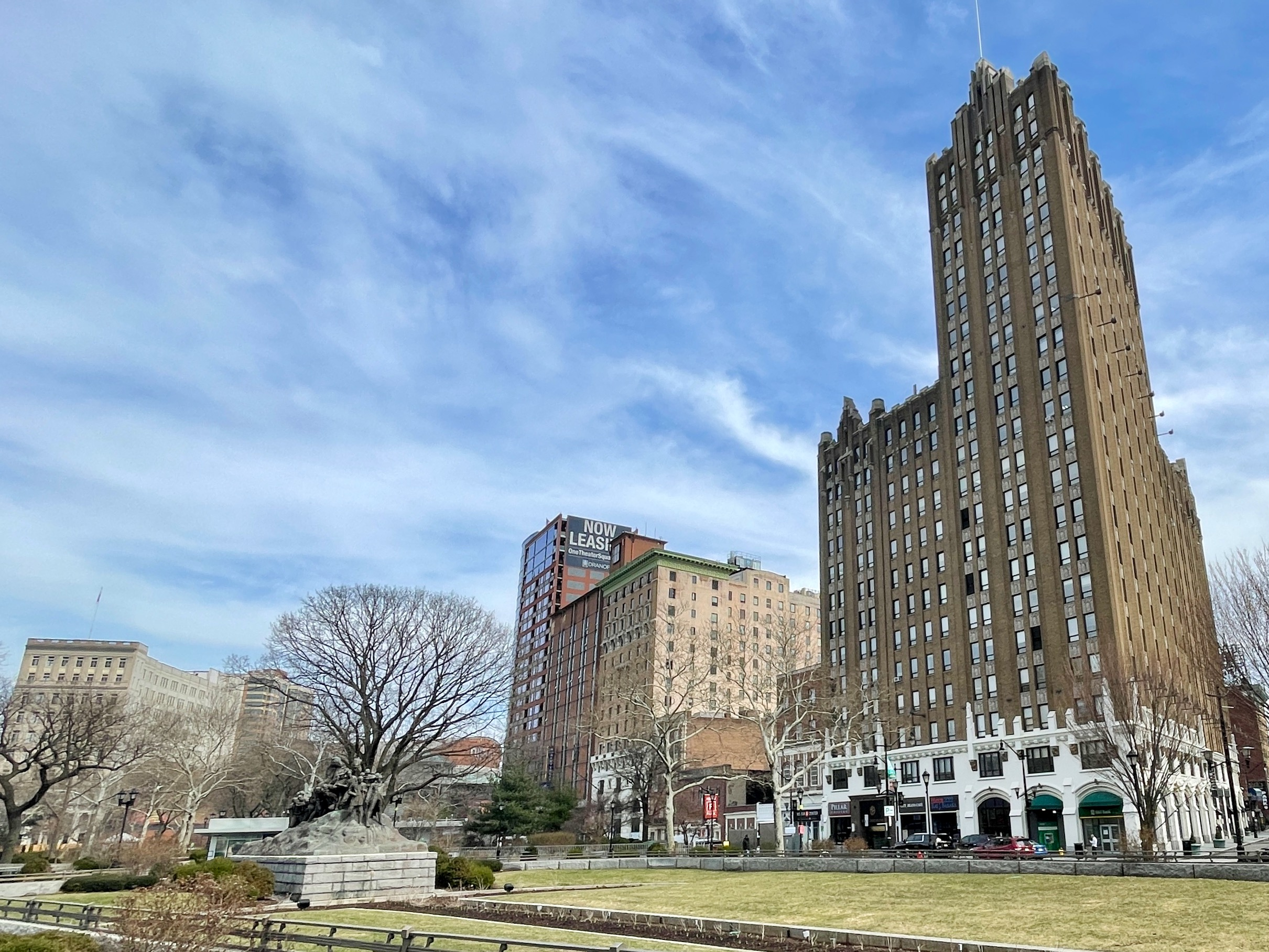
Military Park, featuring Wars of America by Mount Rushmore sculptor Gutzon Borglum

Downtown Newark is the home to Newark's major cultural venues - the New Jersey Performing Arts Center (NJPAC), the 3,000-seat Newark Symphony Hall, Prudential Center, the critically acclaimed Newark Museum of Art, Military Park, and the New Jersey Historical Society. Downtown is also home to Seton Hall University School of Law and Aljira, an emerging artist's gallery. It is also home to historic Grace Church (Episcopal), and the Government Center, an area of municipal and federal government offices, as well as the Newark Convention and Visitors Bureau, where visitors can find out all things happening in the city of Newark. It was once home to a Chinatown neighborhood centered on Mulberry Arcade, which was off of Mulberry Street, near Lafayette and Green Streets. At the intersection of Mulberry St & Green St the Newark Parking Authority is building a five floor parking deck which will also feature office space for the Parking Authority and a cafe with indoor and outdoor seating. Many of downtown's cultural and historical sites are linked by the unmarked Lenape Trail, which also leads to Branch Brook Park, the Watchung Mountains and the Passaic Meadows on this yellow-blazed trail.

The $375 million Prudential Center, home to the New Jersey Devils, opened on October 25, 2007, with the first of ten concerts by Bon Jovi. Since then numerous "big name" acts have performed there, the Rolling Stones pay per view 50th anniversary concert in 2013 was broadcast from the Prudential Center. At the time, the arena was the New York metropolitan area's first all-new professional sports venue in over two decades. The 2019 MTV Video Music Awards show took place there on August 26.

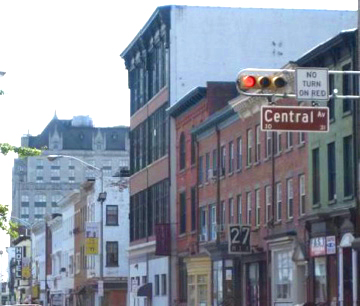
Halsey Street near University Heights is lined with galleries and restaurants

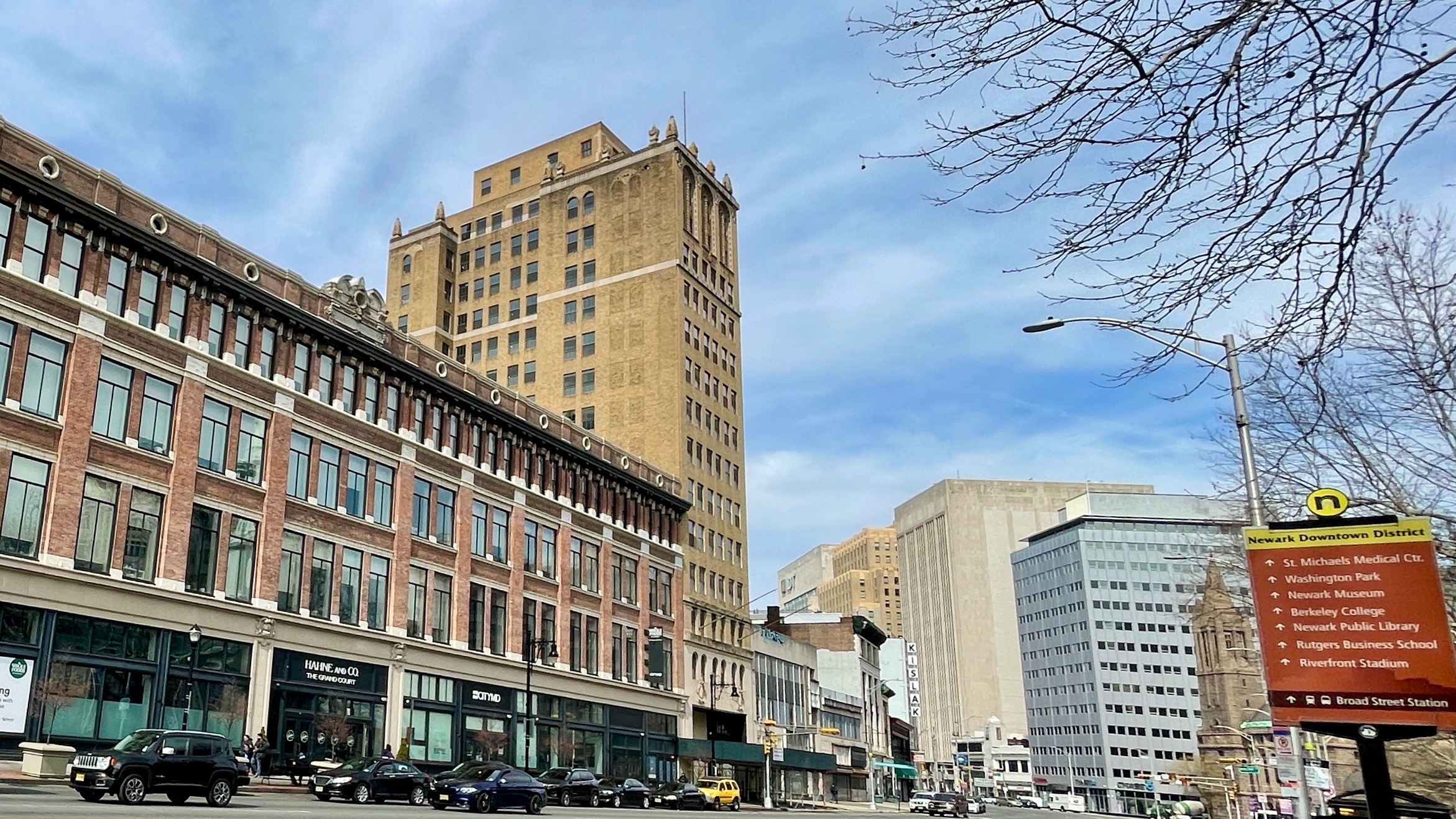
Broad Street with Hahne and Company and Griffith Building, both listed on the NRHP

== Four Corners ==
Much of the city's retail and commercial developments is centered on Broad Street and Market Street. The intersection of the two streets, known as Four Corners is widely considered to be one of the busiest in the state and at one time was considered the busiest in the country.

Both Broad Street and Market Street are a bustle of activity crowded with numerous shops. Broad Street has many street vendors as well. At night, however, the streets are vacant and shops are closed. The City of Newark is committed to turning downtown into a "24-hour city" and the downtown area is slowly beginning to develop a 24-hour presence. The former Hahne's and Lefcourt buildings have been converted into mixed use developments and other retail establishments including restaurants, bookstore, bank, doctors office, and over one hundred residential apartments beginning in 2014. A six-story addition and underground parking was built on the Halsey St side of the complex. Also, two brand new luxury high rise apartment buildings have recently opened. One Theatre Square, which is directly opposite the NJPAC, developed by Dranoff Properties, it is 23 stories and features private balconies/terraces, parking deck, rooftop swimming pool, and other amenities. Nearby, Boraie Development constructed the 21 story luxury apartment building known as 50 Rector Street. It was constructed on the former site of Science High School. It also has many amenities including underground parking, rooftop swimming pool and tiki bar, etc.. Rutgers–Newark has built two dormitories on Central Avenue, and an Honors Living/Learning Center on Halsey St between New and Linden Sts. An old office building on Clinton Street has already successfully been converted to luxury lofts. Additionally, 1180 Raymond, which is across from Military Park and Newark's second tallest building, completed a $150 million conversion to luxury apartments in 2006. Recently, the former home of New Jersey Bell at 540 Broad St has been converted into market rate apartments. Verizon will still lease three floors in the building. The structure is named Walker House, after the building's original architect Leyland Walker. The former Kislak building at 579 Broad St near Central Ave has recently been converted into market rate apartments.

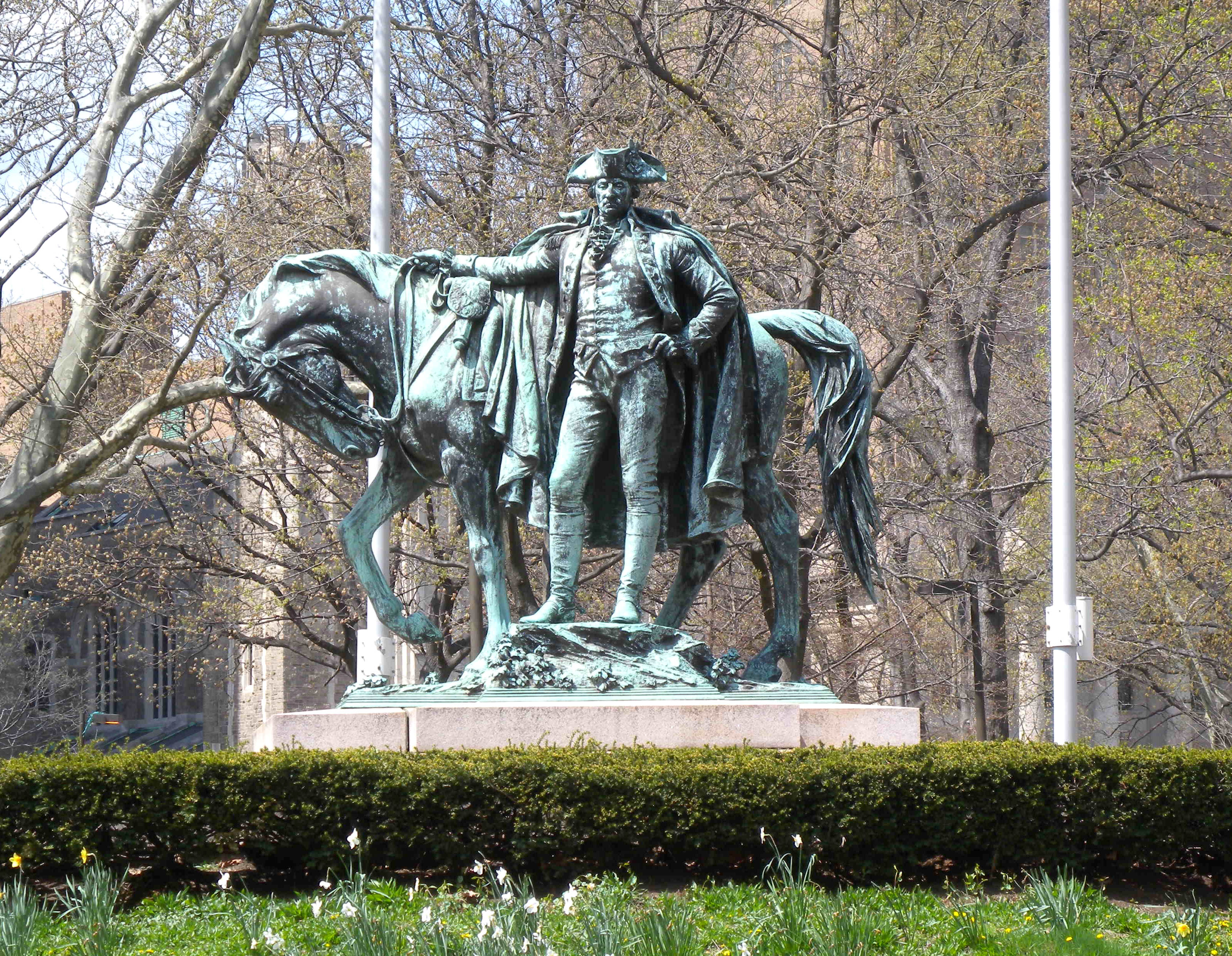
George Washington in Washington Park

Aided by the presence of the New Jersey Performing Arts Center, new apartments, and its proximity to the Newark's colleges and universities, including New Jersey Institute of Technology and Rutgers-Newark, downtown has seen a variety of restaurants and bars open their doors in the past several years. In addition to several high end restaurants catering to the theater crowd, downtown Newark is home to two Irish pubs, a SoHo style bistro, a gourmet soup restaurant, and an increasing number of other establishments.

Most buses pass through Downtown and it is a principal shopping district of most Newark area residents. Washington Street Station, Penn Station, Military Park Station, and all the stops on the Newark Light Rail serve the downtown area. Interstate 280 lies just north of Downtown, running parallel to New Jersey Transit rail operations.

The Main Library is on Washington Park and served by the Newark Light Rail.

== See also ==
- Triangle Park (Newark)
- List of tallest buildings in Newark
