= Symington House =

Historic house in New Jersey, United States

- U.S. National Register of Historic Places
- U.S. Historic district – Contributing property
- New Jersey Register of Historic Places
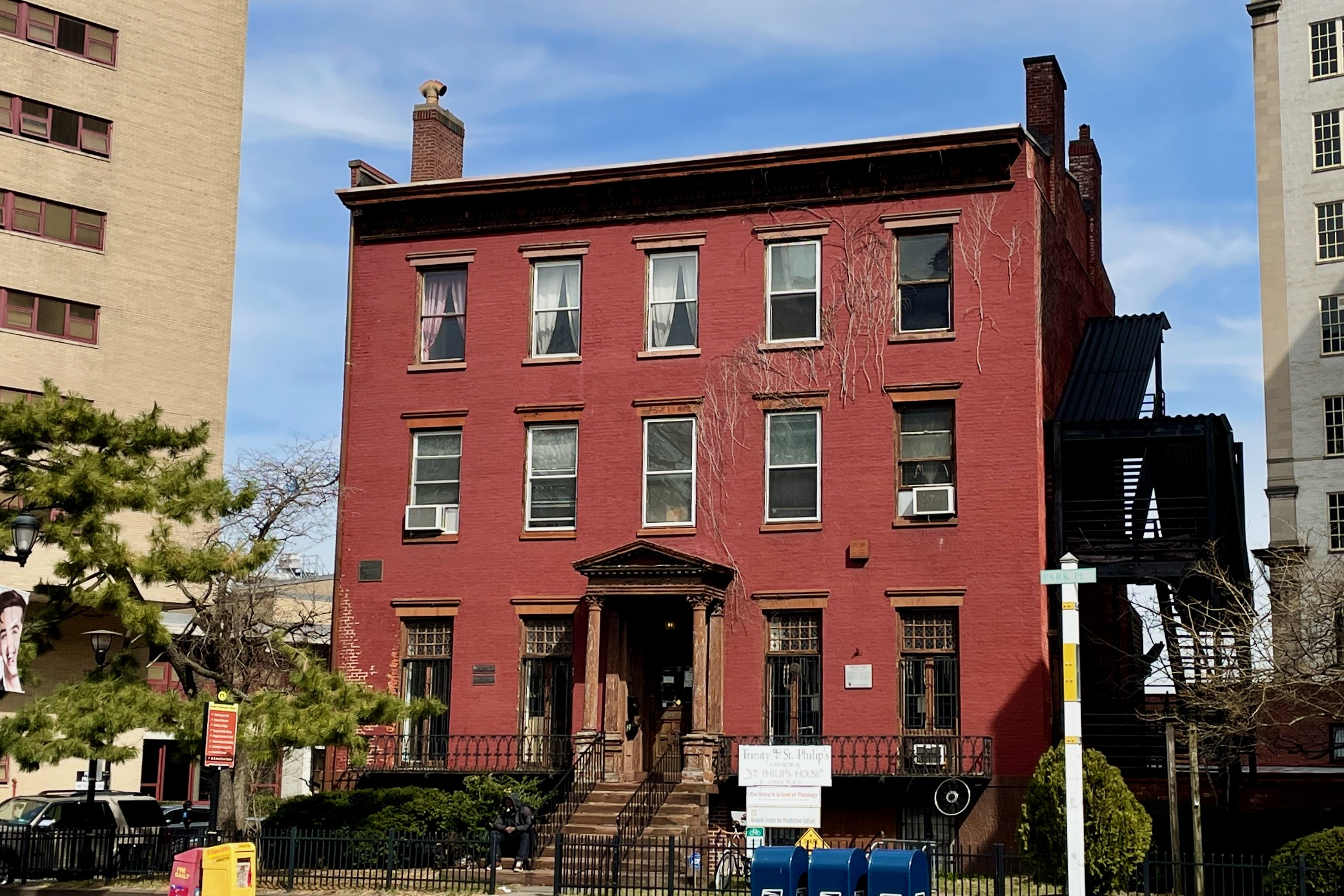
- Symington–Continental House in 2022

- Location within Essex County, New Jersey Location within New Jersey Location within the United States
- Location: 2 Park Place; Newark, New Jersey
- Coordinates: 40°44′26″N 74°10′7″W
- Area: 1 acre (0.40 ha)
- Built: 1808
- Architectural style: Federal
- Part of: Military Park Commons Historic District (ID04000649)
- NRHP reference No.: 79001487
- NJRHP No.: 1330

Significant dates
- Added to NRHP: March 2, 1979
- Designated CP: June 18, 2004
- Designated NJRHP: April 27, 1978

The Symington House, also known as the Symington–Continental House, is located at 2 Park Place in Newark, Essex County, New Jersey, United States. The house, built in 1808, is the last of the great mansions that were on the north side of Military Park. It was added to the National Register of Historic Places on March 2, 1979, for its significance in architecture. It was added as a contributing property to the Military Park Commons Historic District on June 18, 2004.

== History and description ==
The house is a three-story brick building with brownstone trim designed with Federal architecture style. The entrance features two fluted columns with Corinthian capitals. It was built in 1808 as a rectory for Trinity Church, which is located across the street. Reverend Matthew H. Henderson lived here until 1856. After the church sold the building, Robert B. Symington bought it in 1888. The Continental Insurance Company bought the building for office space in 1965. Trinity & St. Philip's Cathedral repurchased it in 1978 and renamed it St. Philip's House.

== See also ==
- National Register of Historic Places listings in Essex County, New Jersey
