= Luigi Del Bianco =

Italian-American sculptor (1892–1969)

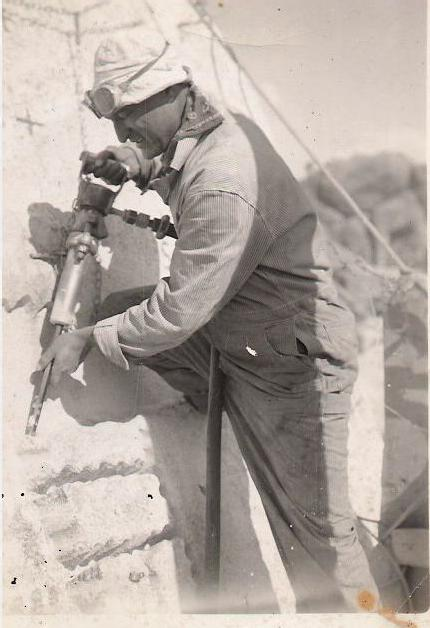
- Luigi Del Bianco on Mount Rushmore
- Born: May 8, 1892; Le Havre, France
- Died: January 20, 1969 (aged 76); Port Chester, New York, U.S.
- Citizenship: Italian
- Known for: Sculpture

Luigi Del Bianco (May 8, 1892 – January 20, 1969) was an Italian-American sculptor and the chief carver of Mount Rushmore.

== Early life and education ==
Del Bianco was born on a ship near Le Havre, France, on May 8, 1892, to Vincenzo and Osvalda Del Bianco, who were returning from the United States to Italy. He showed interest in carving at a young age, and spent time in Austria and Venice studying the art of.

== Career ==
When Del Bianco was 18 years old, he left for the United States of America, arriving in Barre, Vermont.

When World War I broke out, Del Bianco returned to Italy and fought for his home country, eventually returning to Vermont in 1920. Del Bianco's brother-in-law introduced him to Mount Rushmore designer Gutzon Borglum, and Del Bianco began working at Borglum's studio. He also opened a stone monument company in thevtpwn he later moved to Port Chester, New York.

In 1933, Borglum hired Del Bianco as chief stone carver on the Mount Rushmore National Memorial. Paid $1.50 an hour, Del Bianco was charged with carving the detail in the faces. He carved Abraham Lincoln's eyes, and patched a dangerous crack in Thomas Jefferson's lip.

Borglum constantly praised Del Bianco for his great abilities as a classically trained stone carver: "He is worth any three men in America for this particular type of work." "He is the only intelligent, efficient stone carver on the work who understands the language of the sculptor." "We could double our progress if we had two like Del Bianco."

Before Mount Rushmore Del Bianco worked on the Stone Mountain memorial and the Wars of America memorial at Military Park in Newark, New Jersey With Borglum.

On September 16, 2017, the National Park Service unveiled a memorial plaque at Mount Rushmore. The plaque acknowledged Luigi Del Bianco's crucial role as the only chief carver on the work.

In 1969 Luigi Del Bianco died of accelerated silicosis. He was 76.
