= Broad Street station =

Broad Street Station may refer to:

- Broad Street railway station (England), a former station in London, England
- Newark Broad Street Station, a station in Newark, New Jersey, United States
  - The former name of Military Park (NLR station), renamed when the system was extended to the above station
- Newark Broad Street station (Central Railroad of New Jersey), a disused station one mile south of the above station
- Broad Street station (BMT Nassau Street Line), a station in the New York City Subway system
- Broad Street Station (Philadelphia), a former station in Philadelphia, Pennsylvania, United States
- Broad Street Station (Richmond), a former station in Richmond, Virginia, United States
