= Military Park Building =

Skyscraper in Newark, New Jersey, U.S.

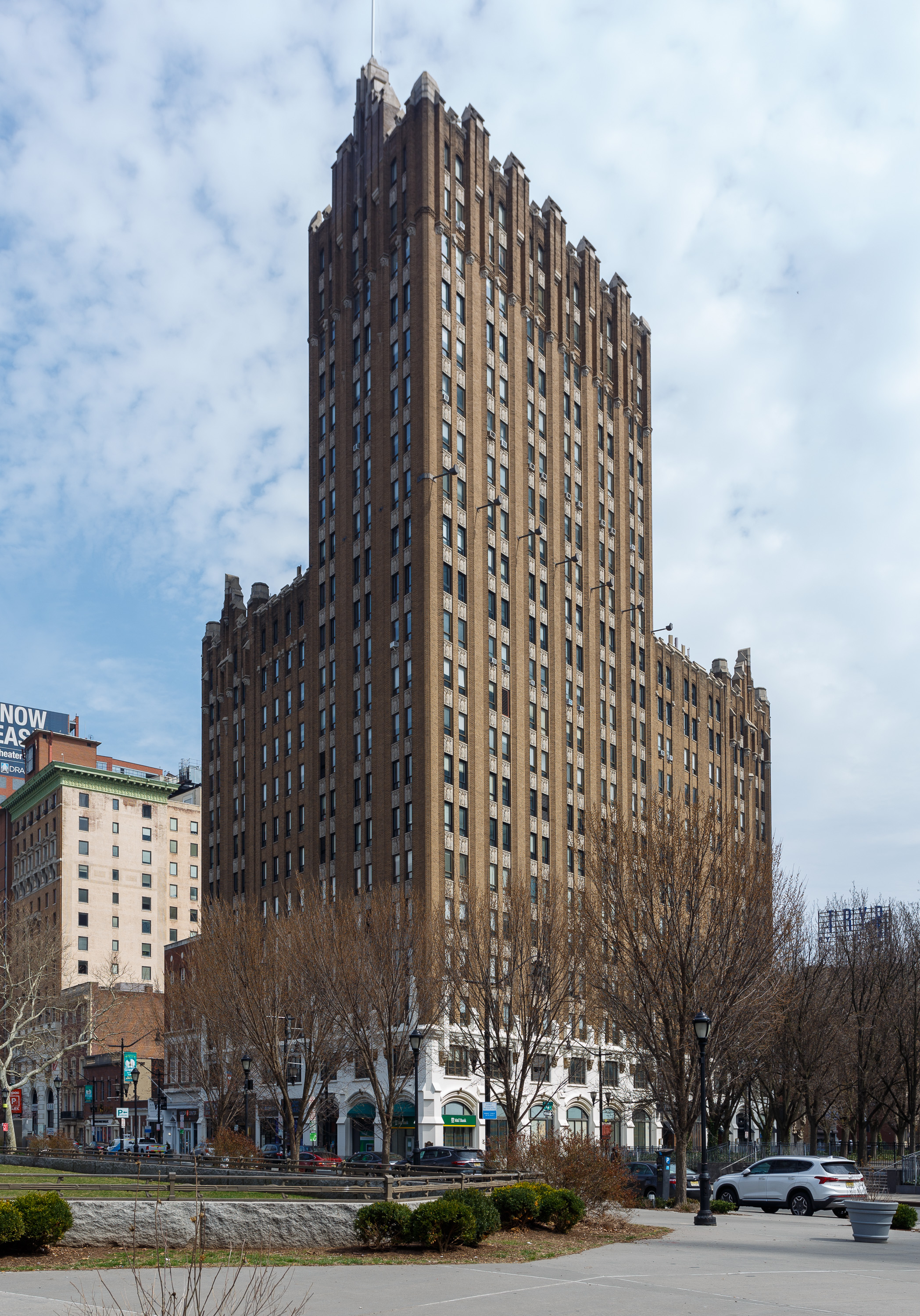
- Interactive map of the Military Park Building area

General information
- Type: Commercial
- Location: 60 Park Place; Newark
- Coordinates: 40°44.31′0″N 74°10.16′0″W
- Construction started: 1925
- Completed: 1926
- Cost: $2.5 Million
- Owner: Berger Organization
- Operator: Current Management - Berger Organization, LLC

Height
- Roof: 81 m (266 ft)

Technical details
- Floor count: 21

Design and construction
- Architects: Polhemus & Coffin (Henry J Polhemus, Lewis A Coffin, Jr)

The Military Park Building in Newark, New Jersey is one of the earliest skyscrapers built downtown. Designed by the architectural firm Polhemus & Coffin of New York, it was the tallest building in New Jersey upon its completion in 1926 until being surpassed in 1930 by the Eleven 80. The landmark takes its name from nearby Military Park. Also nearby are some of the city's most prominent institutions such as Newark Museum, New Jersey Performing Arts Center, Newark Public Library, New Jersey Historical Society and Rutgers University. It is served by the Military Park (NLR station).

The Military Park Building is owned by the Newark-based Berger Organization, which acquired it in late 2007. Berger previously had been a minority partner in the 250,000-square-foot, 21-story building. Renovations completed in 2010 upgraded the lobby, core building and elevators, and introduced a fitness center and conference room for tenants. That project also established street-level retail accessible from both outside and within the building.

== See also ==
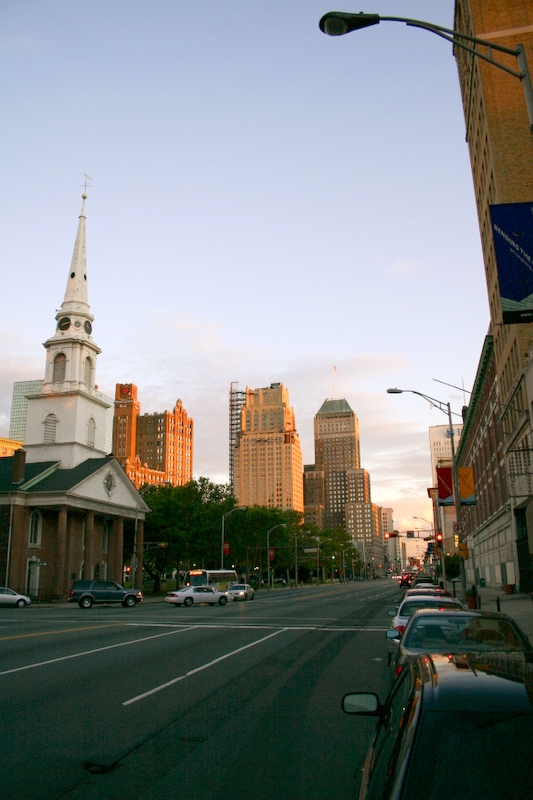
Military Park Building second from left

- List of tallest buildings in Newark
