= Griffith Building =

- U.S. National Register of Historic Places
- U.S. Historic district – Contributing property
- New Jersey Register of Historic Places
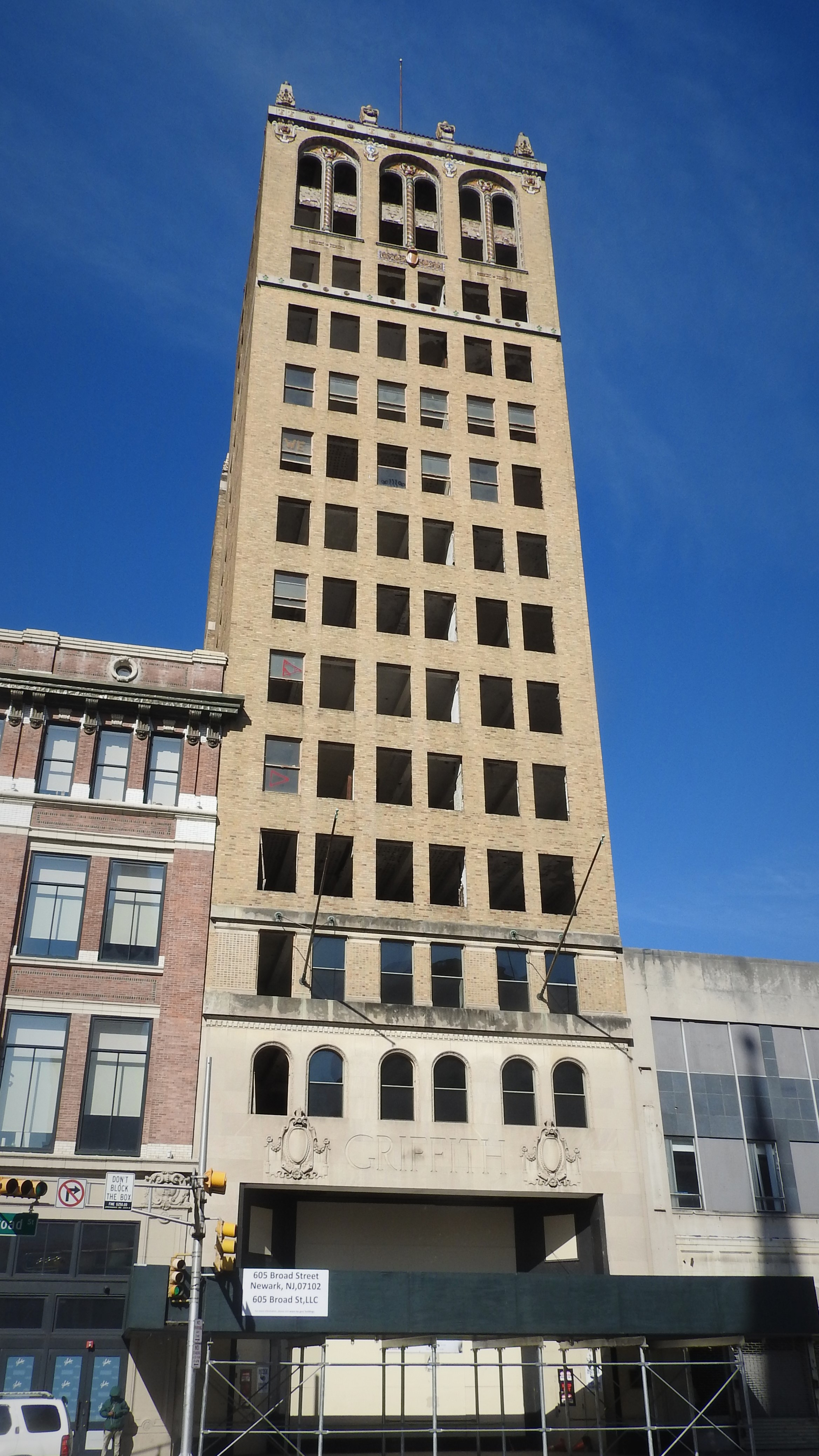
- Griffith Building in 2020

- Location within Essex County, New Jersey Location within New Jersey Location within the United States
- Location: 605-607 Broad Street; Newark, New Jersey
- Coordinates: 40°44′27″N 74°10′11″W
- Area: 0.3 acres (0.12 ha)
- Built: 1927
- Architect: George Elwood Jones
- Architectural style: Gothic
- Part of: Military Park Commons Historic District (ID04000649)
- NRHP reference No.: 84002641
- NJRHP No.: 1263

Significant dates
- Added to NRHP: May 24, 1984
- Designated CP: June 18, 2004
- Designated NJRHP: April 17, 1984

The Griffith Building, also known as the Griffith Piano Company Building, is a high-rise located at 605-607 Broad Street by Military Park in the city of Newark in Essex County, New Jersey, United States. It was built in 1927 to serve as headquarters of the Griffith Piano Company and the Griffith Foundation, and was added to the National Register of Historic Places on May 24, 1984, for its significance in architecture, commerce, and music. It was added as a contributing property to the Military Park Commons Historic District on June 18, 2004.

== Site ==
The building is located at 605-607 Broad Street, abutting the Hahne and Company department store on the left, and a two-story commercial building on the right. It overlooks Military Park, bordered by office high-rises and the prominent Robert Treat Hotel.

== Architecture ==
=== Form ===
The Griffith Building extends 42.5 feet (13 m) north along Broad Street and 177 feet (54 m) west. It has an air shaft on the south elevation extending upwards from the fifth floor, confering it a "U" shape.

=== Façade ===
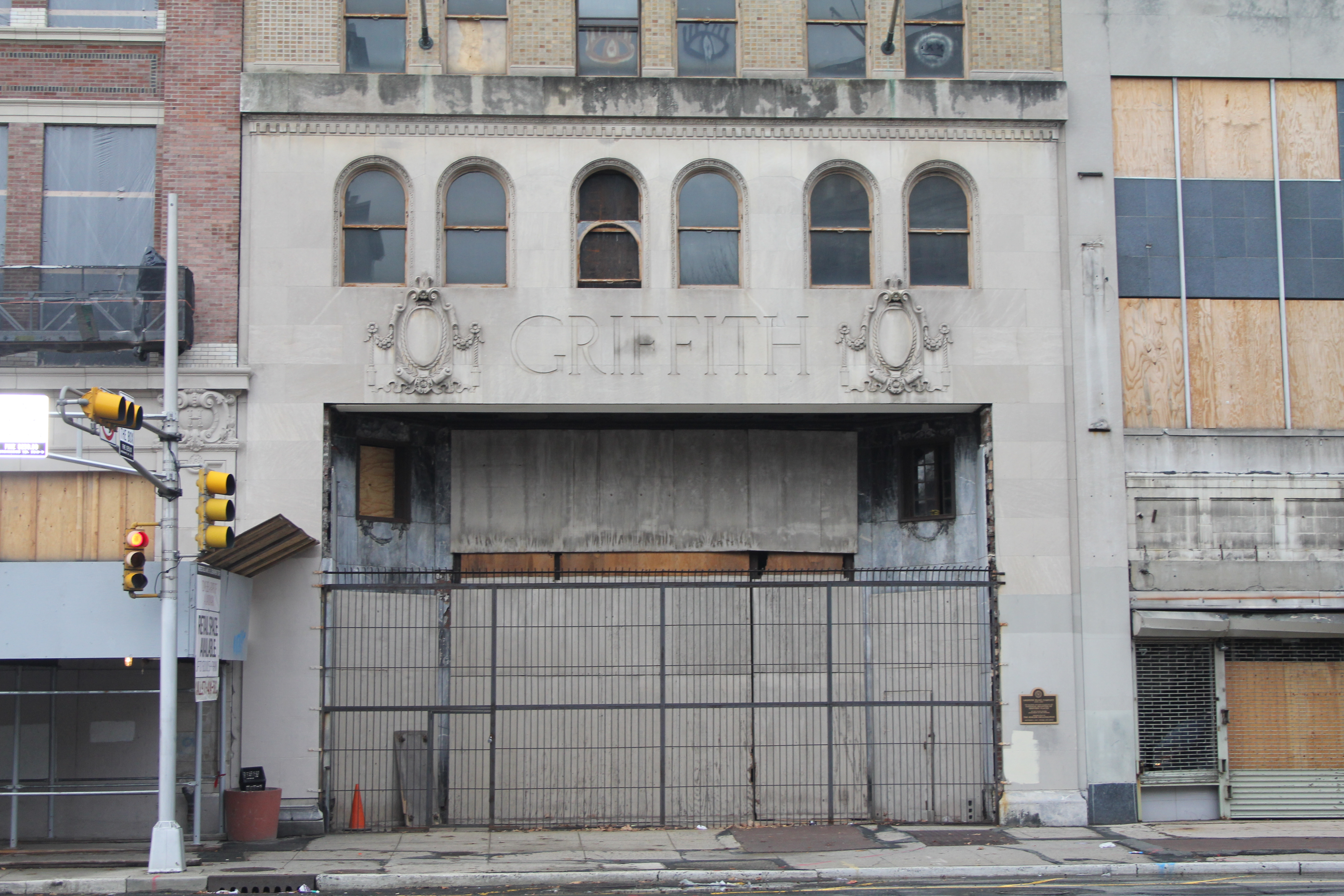
Detail of the entryway.

The base of the building, comprising the first floor, mezzanine and second floor, is clad in scored granite. It is pierced by a recess with a central showcase window, made up of three sections of nine, eighteen and nine panes, and with angled walls on either side. The window and other first floor openings have bronze surrounds and muntins, and the angled walls are pierced by double-leaf French doors with fanlights. The recess is surmounted by the name "GRIFFITH" carved in Roman-block letters approximately 1 foot high, with garland medallions on either side, and six semicircular windows above with convex stone surrounds decorated with foliage. The base is topped by a band of stone underlined by a dentil frieze.

The fourth through twelfth floors are clad in yellow brick and have identical rows of six rectangular windows. The tweltfth floor has a horizontal band at sill level decorated with brown roundels and green shields. The top of the building is more elaborately decorated, with three biforas spanning the thirteenth and fourteenth floors, containing a pair of windows each per floor, and a Solomonic column in the middle – reminiscent of Neo-Romanesque architecture. The central panel has a medallion under the column's base. The building is topped by a band identical to that of the twelfth floor. The band is surmounted by four obelisks aligned with the center lines of the façade's frame.

The north and south elevations are clad in yellow brick and are relatively featureless. The rear elevation is pierced by rows of two windows and recessed balconies and fire escapes with metal doors.

=== Features ===
==== Interior ====
Historically, the interior of the Griffith Building comprised a piano sales area and recital hall spanning the first floor and mezzanine, a four story piano workshop and warehouse, and fourteen stories of office space. The first floor and mezzanine are the most elaborately decorated, with terrazzo foyers and bronze octagonal coffered ceilings.

The offices span the second to sixteenth floors of the building. They are accessible by a row of three elevators along the north wall, and an adjacent fire escape. Each floor has a corridor running east to west serving the elevators, stairwell, and bathrooms. At their west end, the corridors lead to the fire escape doors and concrete balconies with metal railings.

== History ==
=== Planning ===
The construction of the building was commissioned by the Griffith Piano Company, founded in 1911 by Parker O. Griffith. Original plans by William E. Lehman, a prolific architect in Downtown Newark, were rejected in favour of the designs of George Elwood Jones (1886–1952), another Newark architect.

=== Construction ===
Construction started in 1927, and the building opened on June 1, 1928. It has 14 floors and is 64.01 m (210.0 ft) tall. The company erected the building as a showroom, workshop, office tower and recital auditorium. Under the direction of Mrs. Parker O. Griffith, a foundation supported by the company was responsible for the direction, support, and programming at Newark Symphony Hall.

=== Vacancy ===
The Griffith Piano Company went bankrupt in 1973 and the building stood vacant for ten years, until its purchase in June 1983 by New York-based developer Sol Gillman for $500,000. Gillman planned to restore the building inside and out, a project which he estimated to cost from $1.6 million to $2 million. Gillman intended to lease the whole building to a corporation, citing the auditorium as an ideal space to hold conferences; though Gillman was also willing to lease to individual tenants, charging $10 a square foot and leaving utilities bills to the tenants' care. However, this project never bore fruit.

In 2008, another project by Manhattan-based Cogswell Realty Group to convert the building into condos was proposed but never went ahead. Further unfruitful projects include a planned hotel in 2013, and in 2016, 55 apartments with an auditorium or co-working space.

=== Renovation ===
In 2018, an application by a "mystery" developer named 605 Broad St., LLC was put forth to deliver commercial space on the first two floors, with residential units above. The developer bought the building in April 2018 from its previous owner, the Newark-based Berger Organization, which had proposed unsuccessful restoration plans, for $6.4 million.

In April 2025, the developer in question was revealed to be Brooklyn-based Park Builders Group. Plans were presented by the building's leasing agent, MIG Real Estate, to revitalise the edifice with "luxury studio and one-bedroom rentals" and a penthouse, alongside 20,000 square feet of retail space spanning the ground and first floors. Residential leasing was due to begin in July or August 2025. The building's original owner was granted land use approvals for the project courtesy of Murphy Schiller & Wilkes LLP.

=== Current use ===
The building today comprises 76 studios and 1 bedroom apartments, complete with a fitness center, game room, lounge, and an electric bike charging station. As of January 2026, rents range from $2,100 to $3,200 per month.

== See also ==
- National Register of Historic Places listings in Essex County, New Jersey
- List of tallest buildings in Newark
