= Polhemus & Coffin =

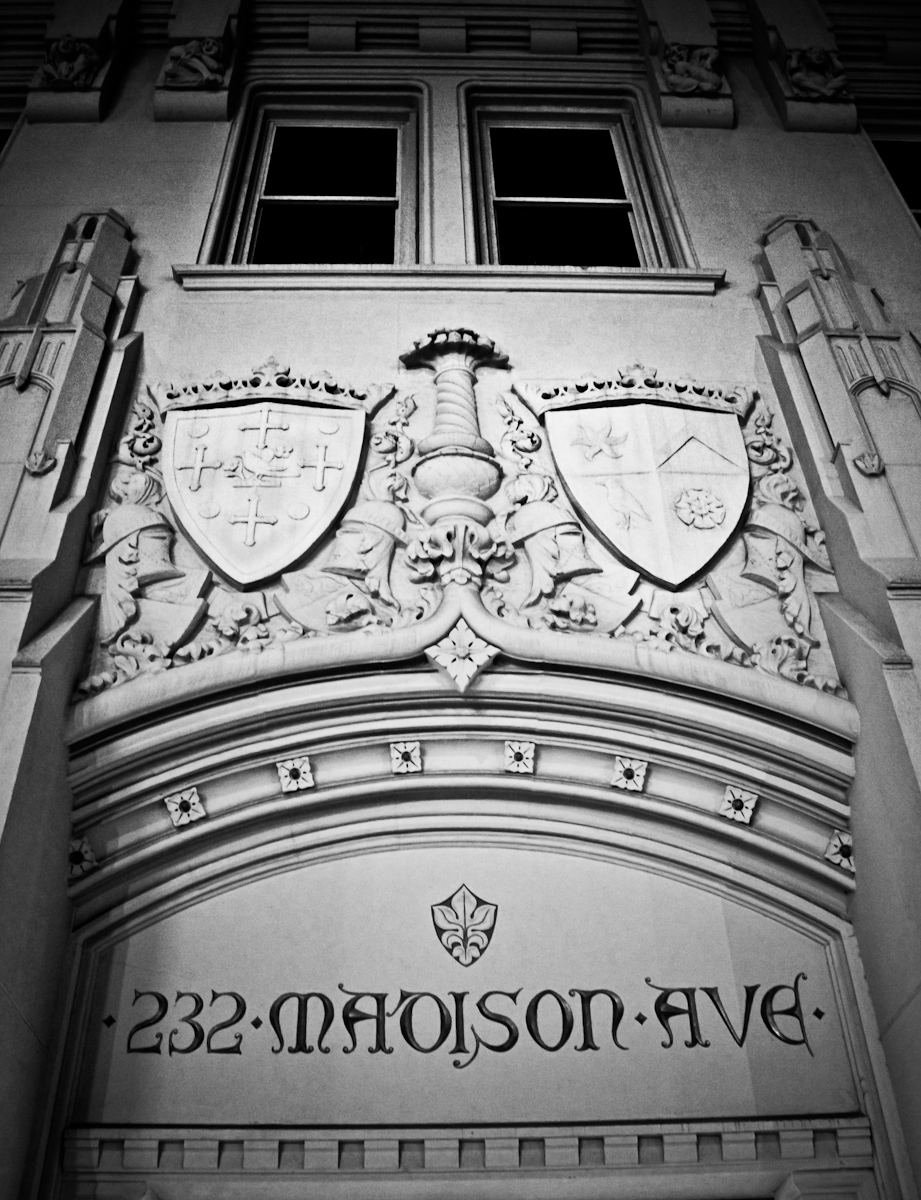
232 Madison Ave, NYC Polhemus & Coffin, AIA

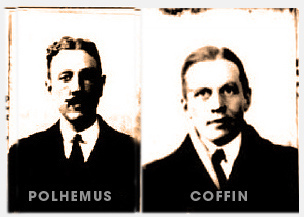
Passport photos - 1920

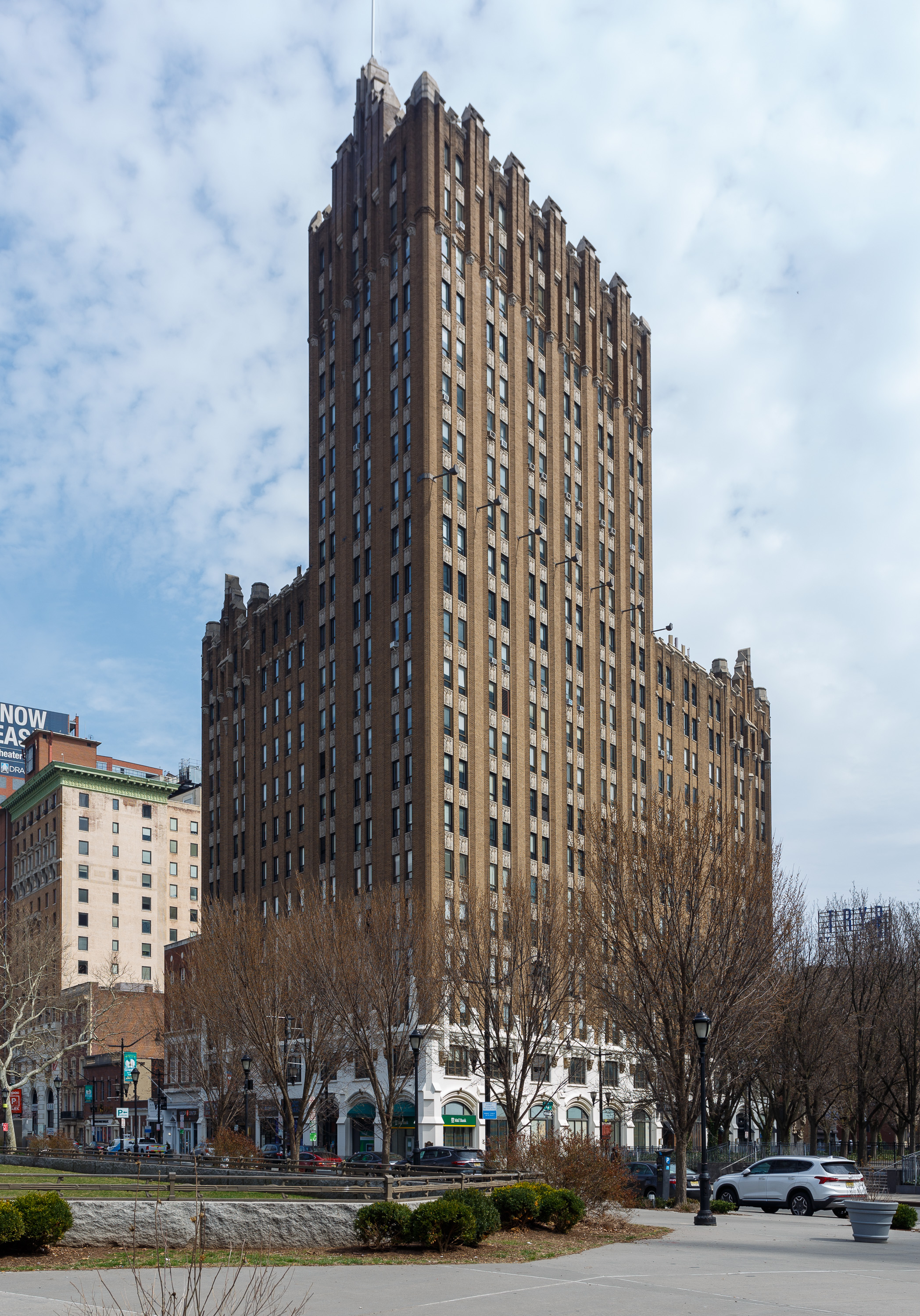
The Military Park Building in Newark, New Jersey

Henry M. Polhemus and Lewis Augustus Coffin, Jr formed the New York-based architectural firm of Polhemus & Coffin. Together they contributed to a joint publication, Small French Buildings: The Architecture of Town and Country, with 183 plates of sketches, illustrations and photos, published by Charles Scribner & Sons in 1921.

Their modest French country manor "Mille Fleurs", designed for Mrs Daniel Guggenheim on the Gould-Guggenheim estate in Port Washington, New York, on the Gold Coast of Long Island, was completed in 1932; it is modeled on the vineyard Château Beauregard, Pommerol. They designed "Champ Soleil", a small 22-room French manor on Bellevue Avenue in Newport, Rhode Island, which was completed in 1929. Sources disagree on whether or not Champ Soleil was modeled on the famous French Norman chateau named La Lanterne, a French Norman chateau near Versailles. Designed for Lucy Drexel Dalgren in 1929, at one time Champ Soleil was the residence of Russell Aitken, artist, big game hunter, Associate Editor of Field & Stream Magazine and step-father of Sunny von Bülow. In 2006, Acanthus Press published a book authored by James Archer Abbott, Jansen - 20th Century Decorators, by James Archer Abbott, which features a chapter about the 1950s update of Champ Soleil, and contains a few detailed renderings and interior photos, detailing work done by famed French decorating firm Maison Jansen.

The firm also designed some apartment buildings and office structures in Manhattan: - 232 Madison Avenue, at 37th Street (1925, standing), a 16-storey office building with streamlined neo-Gothic details, and 140 East 54th Street (1931, demolished). Lewis Coffin, who had graduated from The Choate School (now Choate Rosemary Hall) in Wallingford, Connecticut in 1908, designed the school's Winter Exercise Building (1931, now the Johnson Athletic Center).

Lewis Augustus Coffin, Jr was born in 1892 and was the son Dr Lewis Augustus Coffin, Sr., a head and neck surgeon. In addition to graduating from the Choate School in 1908, he went on to attend Columbia University to acquire his Certificate in Architecture in 1914. He began a solo career in 1917 and then in 1919 he joined Henry Polhemus as partner to form Polhemus & Coffin. Coffin expressed an affinity and passion for French country structures, and the firm designed many single dwelling homes in New Jersey, New York, and Connecticut. They travelled to France numerous times for research and to survey examples for their book. Coffin also designed a few homes in Onteora Park Historic District, the former artist community and long-time summer retreat outside Tannersville in upstate New York. Onteora Park was added to the National Historical Register of Historic Places in 2003, and the listing included at least one of Coffin's designs, with the remaining designs on hold until the time qualification is reached.

Lewis A Coffin, Jr died in 1963 in New York City.

Their draftsman George Hickey established an independent practise designing houses with a French flavor, many of them modeled on sketches from Polhemus & Coffin’s Small French Buildings. His most famous house in this genre, "Stonecrop" in Cold Spring Harbor (1957), owes its reputation in large part to the more famous garden laid out and planted by the owner, Frank Cabot.

An archive of photographs of their residential work in the Northeast, much of it in an unobtrusive vernacular Colonial style, is among the Gottscho-Schleisner Collection (Library of Congress).

== See also ==
- Military Park Building
