= Wars of America =

- U.S. National Register of Historic Places
- New Jersey Register of Historic Places
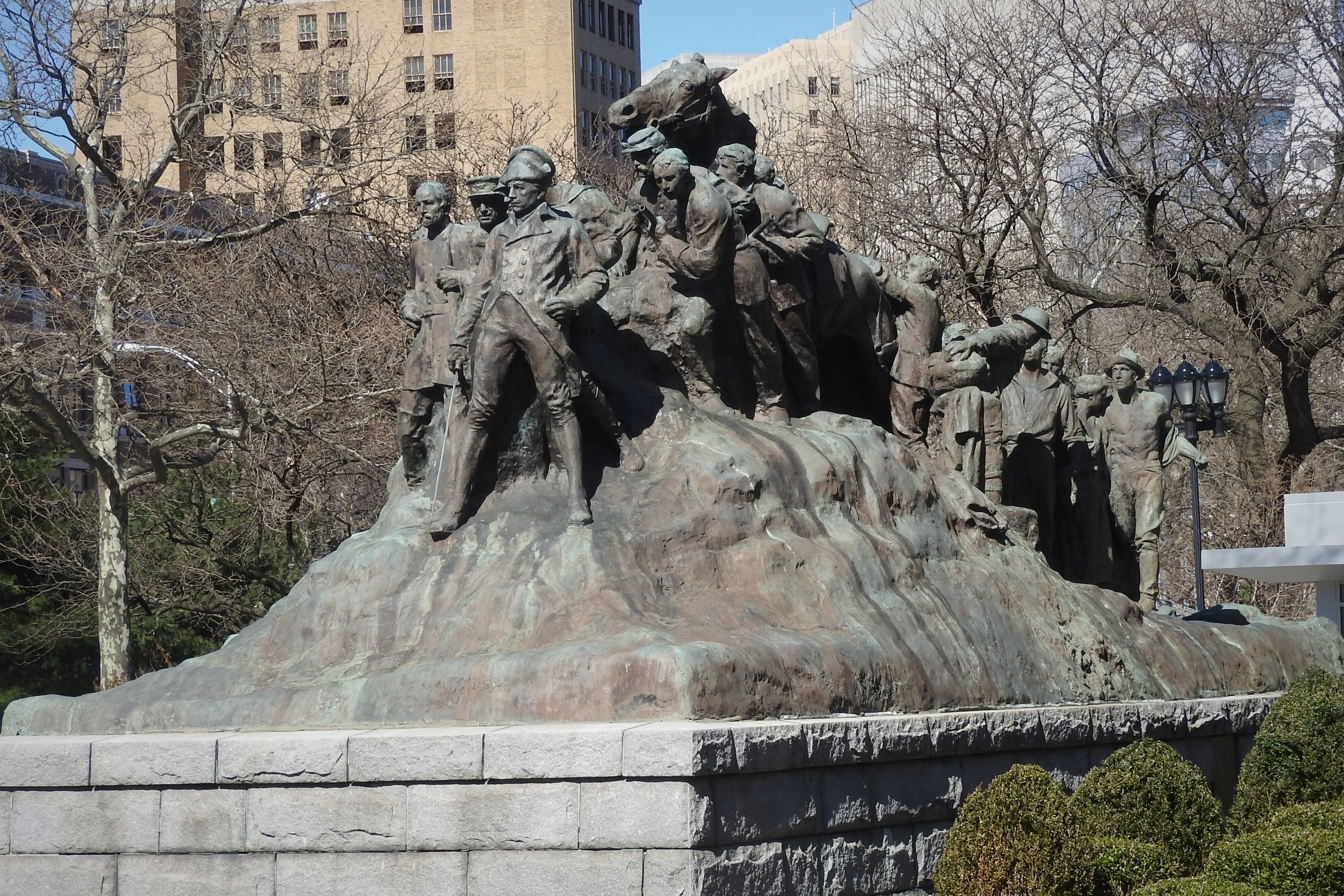
- Wars of America sculpture in Newark, New Jersey

- Location within Essex County, New Jersey Location within New Jersey Location within the United States
- Location: Military Park, 614-706 Broad Street, Newark, New Jersey, U.S.
- Coordinates: 40°44′53″N 74°10′13″W
- Area: less than one acre
- Built: 1926
- Architect: Gutzon Borglom
- MPS: Public Sculpture in Newark MPS
- NRHP reference No.: 94001257
- NJRHP No.: 1338

Significant dates
- Added to NRHP: October 28, 1994
- Designated NJRHP: September 13, 1994

Wars of America is a colossal bronze sculpture by Mount Rushmore sculptor Gutzon Borglum and his assistant Luigi Del Bianco containing "forty-two humans and two horses", located in Military Park in Newark, New Jersey. The sculpture sets on a base of granite from Stone Mountain.

The sculpture was erected in 1926, eight years after World War I ended, but its intent was broadened to honor all of America's war dead. In describing it, Borglum said "The design represents a great spearhead. Upon the green field of this spearhead we have placed a Tudor sword, the hilt of which represents the American nation at a crisis, answering the call to arms."

The work was funded by a $100,000 bequest by Newark businessman Amos Hoagland Van Horn, who also funded Borglums Seated Lincoln, also located in Newark. The sculpture was added to the National Register of Historic Places on October 28, 1994.

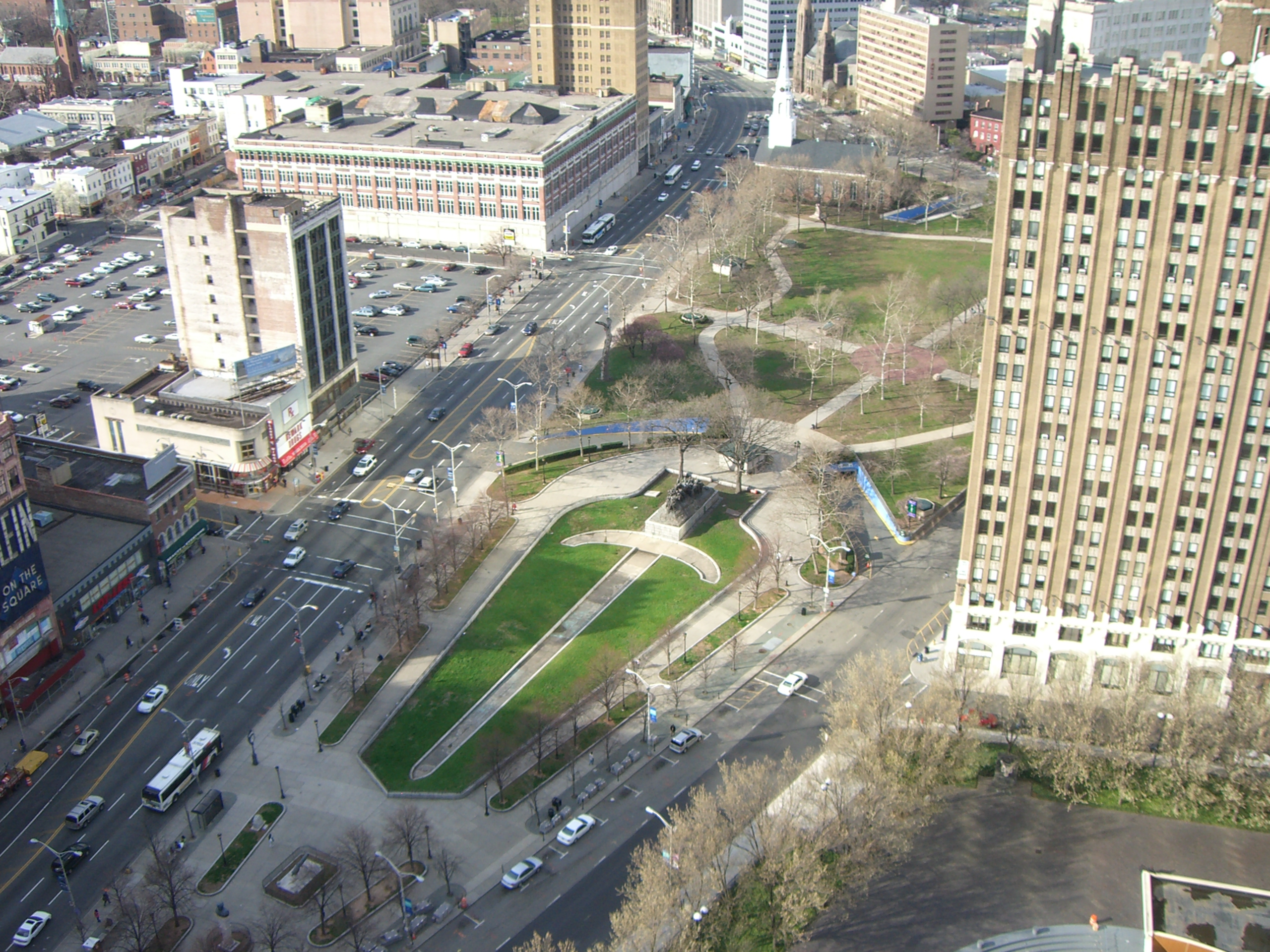
The base of the Wars of America (1926) monument at Military Park. "The design represents a great spearhead. Upon the green field of this spearhead we have placed a Tudor sword, the hilt of which represents the American nation at a crisis, answering the call to arms."-- sculptor Gutzon Borglum

== See also ==
- National Register of Historic Places listings in Essex County, New Jersey
