= Trinity & St. Philip's Cathedral (Newark, New Jersey) =

Historic church in New Jersey, United States

- Trinity Cathedral
- U.S. National Register of Historic Places
- U.S. Historic district – Contributing property
- New Jersey Register of Historic Places
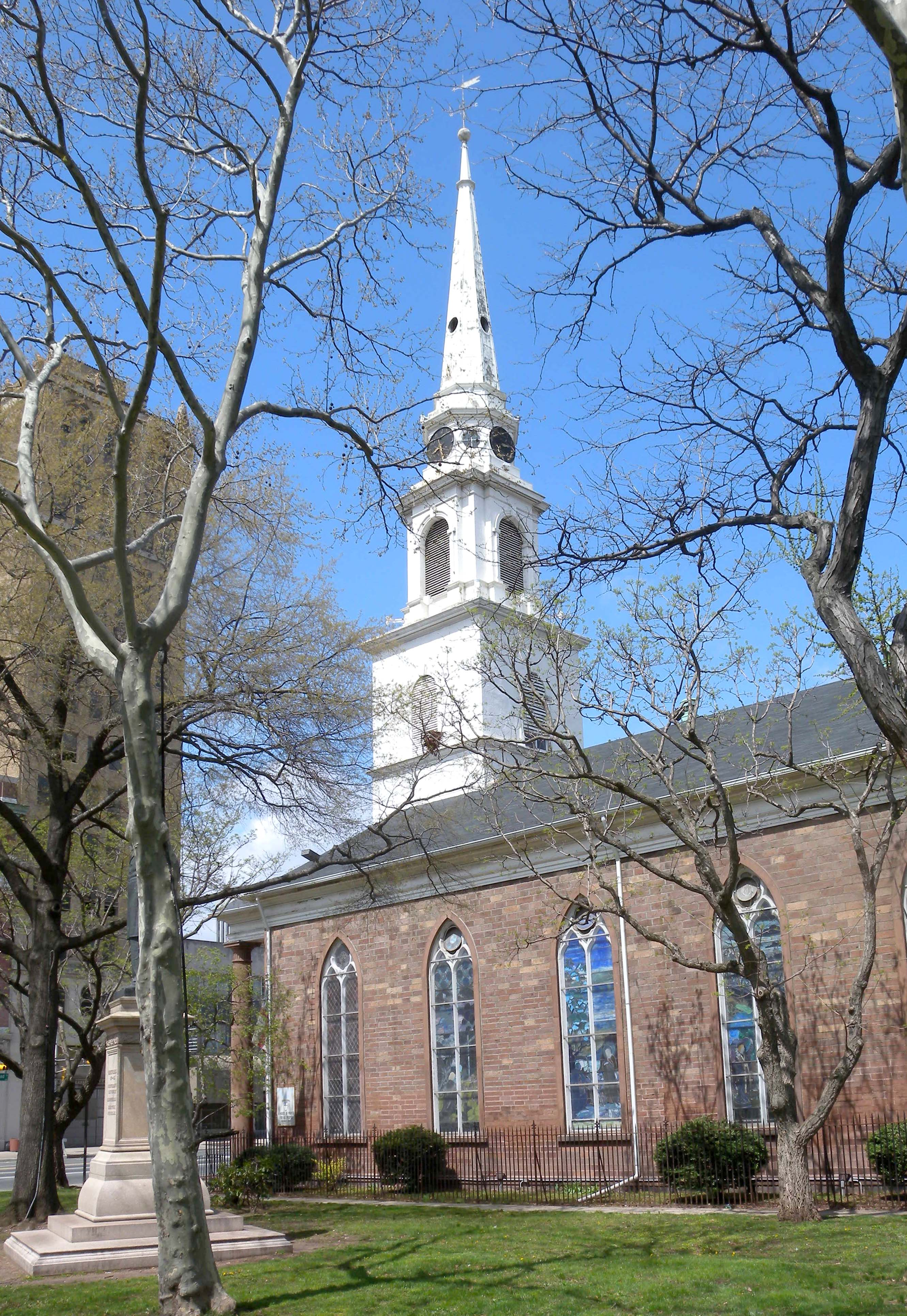

- Location within Essex County, New Jersey Location within New Jersey Location within the United States
- Location: Broad and Rector Streets, Newark, New Jersey
- Coordinates: 40°44′25″N 74°10′9″W
- Area: 1 acre (0.40 ha)
- Built: 1810
- Architects: Josiah James; Richard Upjohn
- Architectural style: Greek Revival, Georgian, Gothic Revival
- Part of: Military Park Commons Historic District (ID04000649)
- NRHP reference No.: 72000793
- NJRHP No.: 1334

Significant dates
- Added to NRHP: November 3, 1972
- Designated CP: June 18, 2004
- Designated NJRHP: December 19, 1977

Trinity & St. Philip's Cathedral is a historic church located at Broad and Rector Streets in Military Park in the city of Newark in Essex County, New Jersey, United States. It is the seat of the Episcopal Diocese of Newark. The church building was added to the National Register of Historic Places on November 3, 1972, for its significance in architecture and religion. It was added as a contributing property to the Military Park Commons Historic District on June 18, 2004.

The cathedral reported 204 members in 2016 and 52 members in 2025. Plate and pledge income for the congregation in 2024 was $82,612 with average Sunday attendance (ASA) of 48.

== History ==
The first services for colonists who had settled in Newark were conducted by visiting priests starting in 1729. They organized Trinity Church and built a small stone church building with a steeple in 1743. A charter was granted by King George II in 1746. The building was used as a hospital for both British and American troops during the American Revolutionary War. It sustained damage during the conflict and the present building was planned and built. It was completed in 1810. A chancel and sanctuary were added to the east end in 1857. Trinity Church was elevated to cathedral status in 1944. St. Philip's Church, a predominantly African American parish on High and West Market Streets, was destroyed in a fire in 1964. Two years later the two congregations were merged. The Very Rev. Dillard Robinson was elected dean in 1968. He was the first African American to serve as a cathedral dean in the United States. The name "St. Philip's" was added to the cathedral name in 1992.

== See also ==
- List of the Episcopal cathedrals of the United States
- List of cathedrals in the United States
- National Register of Historic Places listings in Essex County, New Jersey
