= Military Park (Newark) =

Public park in Newark, New Jersey, US

- Military Park Commons Historic District
- U.S. National Register of Historic Places
- U.S. Historic district
- New Jersey Register of Historic Places
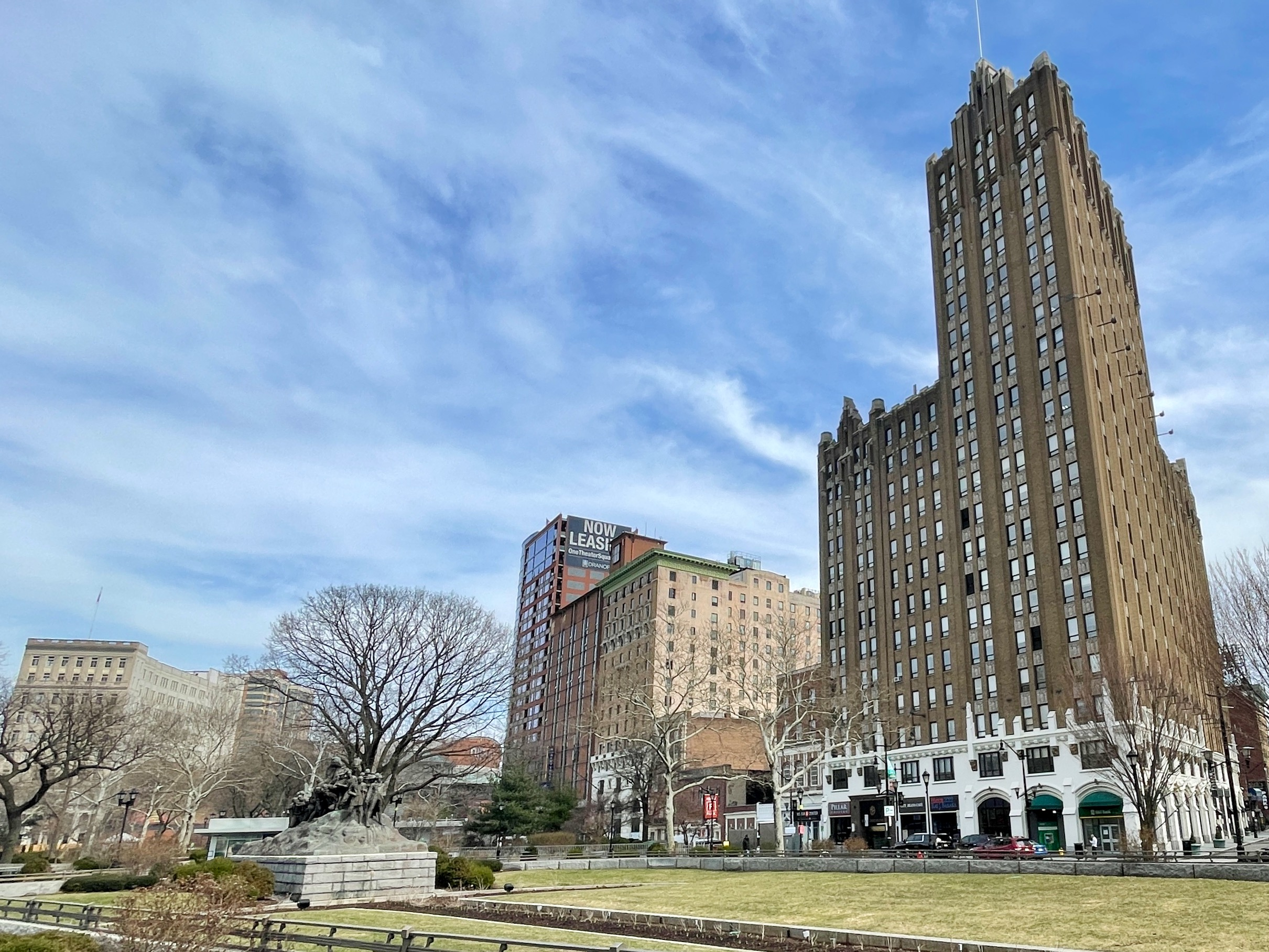
- Wars of America and Military Park Building

- Location within Essex County, New Jersey Location within New Jersey Location within the United States
- Location: Roughly bounded by Park Place, Broad St, E. Park Street and Raymond Boulevard; Newark, New Jersey
- Coordinates: 40°44′23″N 74°10′9″W
- Area: 10 acres (4.0 ha)
- Built: 1916
- Architects: John H. Ely, Wilson C. Ely; Guilbert and Betelle
- Architectural style: Renaissance, Italianate
- NRHP reference No.: 04000649
- NJRHP No.: 1283

Significant dates
- Added to NRHP: June 18, 2004
- Designated NJRHP: August 29, 1990

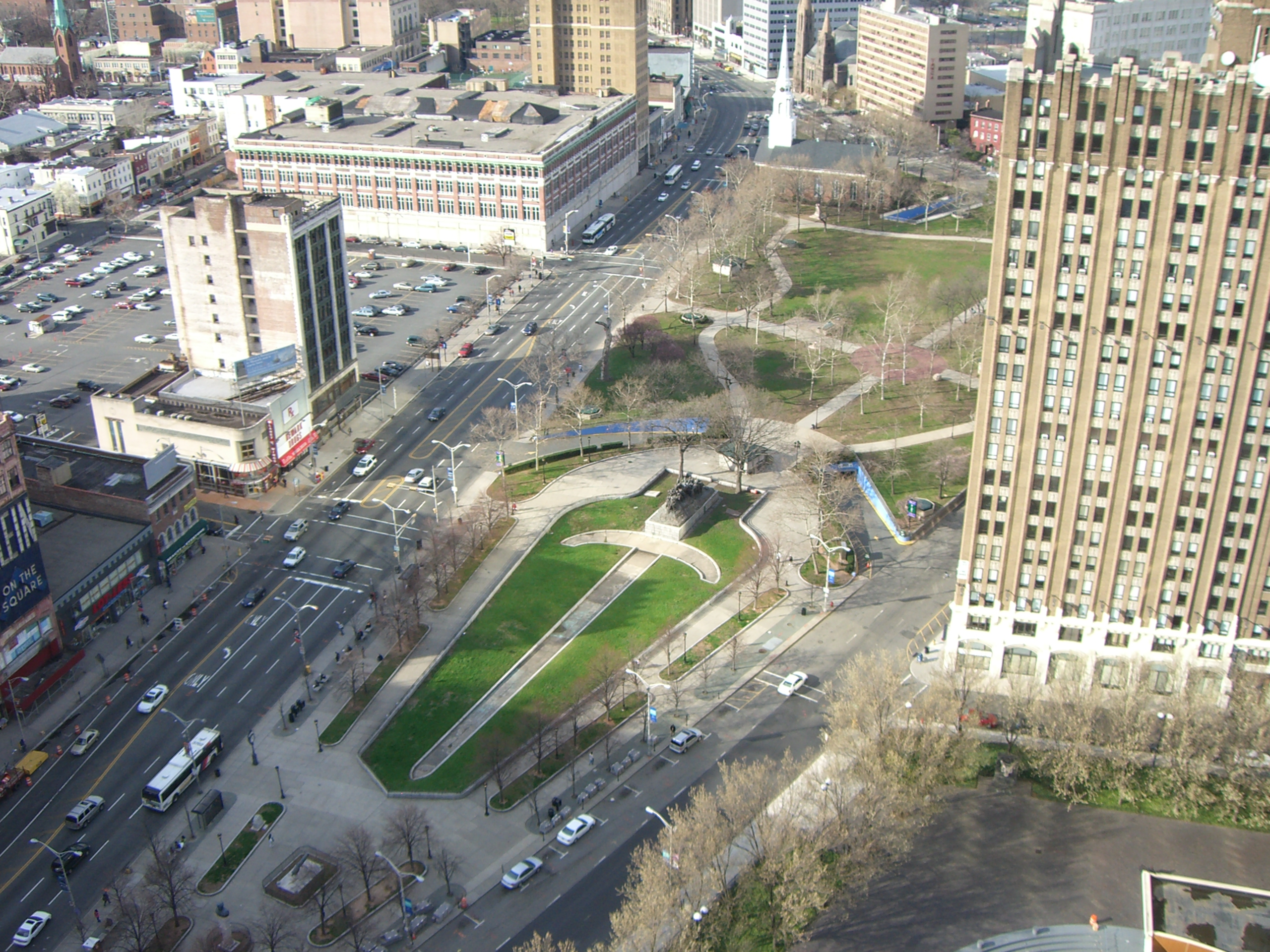
The base of the Wars of America (1926) monument at Military Park, created by the sculptor of Mount Rushmore to honor America's war dead. "The design represents a great spearhead. Upon the green field of this spearhead we have placed a Tudor sword, the hilt of which represents the American nation at a crisis, answering the call to arms." – sculptor Gutzon Borglum

Military Park is a 6-acre (24,000 m^{2}) city park in downtown Newark in Newark, New Jersey. Along with Lincoln Park and Washington Park, it makes up the three downtown parks in Newark that were laid out in the colonial era. It is a nearly triangular park located between Park Place, Rector Street and Broad Street.

The New Jersey Historical Society, Military Park Building, the New Jersey Performing Arts Center, the Robert Treat Center and the newly built One Theatre Square and 50 Rector St buildings are located across Park Place from the park. A $3.25 million renovation led by Dan Biederman was announced in February 2012. The reconstruction was expected to be completed in late 2013, but due to harsh weather was postponed until spring 2014. A casual restaurant, Burg, does business in the park. The park reopened in June 2014.

== History ==
1868

The park was originally laid out by Robert Treat at the founding of Newark as a training ground for soldiers. It saw periodic military use throughout its history; it served as a training ground during the French and Indian War, a campground for the American army in the American Revolution and the War of 1812. At the end of the American Revolution it was designated as a public park.

There was a period of time in the mid-20th century where the park fell into disrepair. The grounds were considered unsafe and therefore unsuitable for the general population's usage. Military Park fell into a state of disrepair until conservation efforts began in 2003 and ground was broken in 2013. The new park grounds boasts a more open and inviting atmosphere for passersby as well as a revitalized location in downtown Newark.

== Historic district ==
The Military Park Commons Historic District is a 10-acre (4.0 ha) historic district roughly bounded by Washington Place, McCarter Highway, E. Park Street and Raymond Boulevard encompassing the park. It was added to the National Register of Historic Places on June 18, 2004, for its significance in architecture, and community planning and development. The district includes 37 contributing buildings, 2 contributing sites, and 9 contributing objects. Eight resources were previously listed individually, including Wars of America by Gutzon Borglum, Griffith Building, Hahne and Company, Symington House, and Trinity & St. Philip's Cathedral.

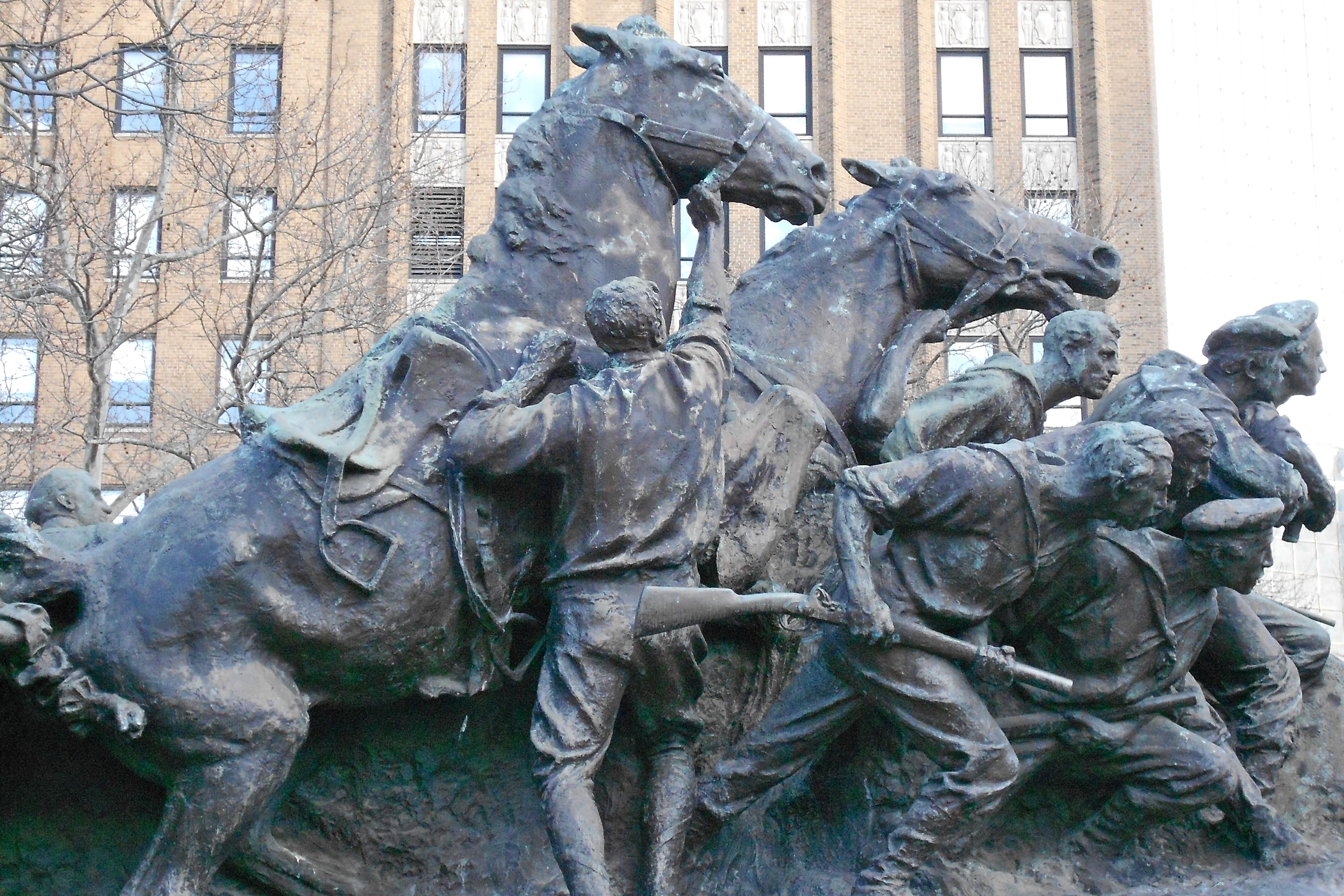
Wars of America by Gutzon Borglum

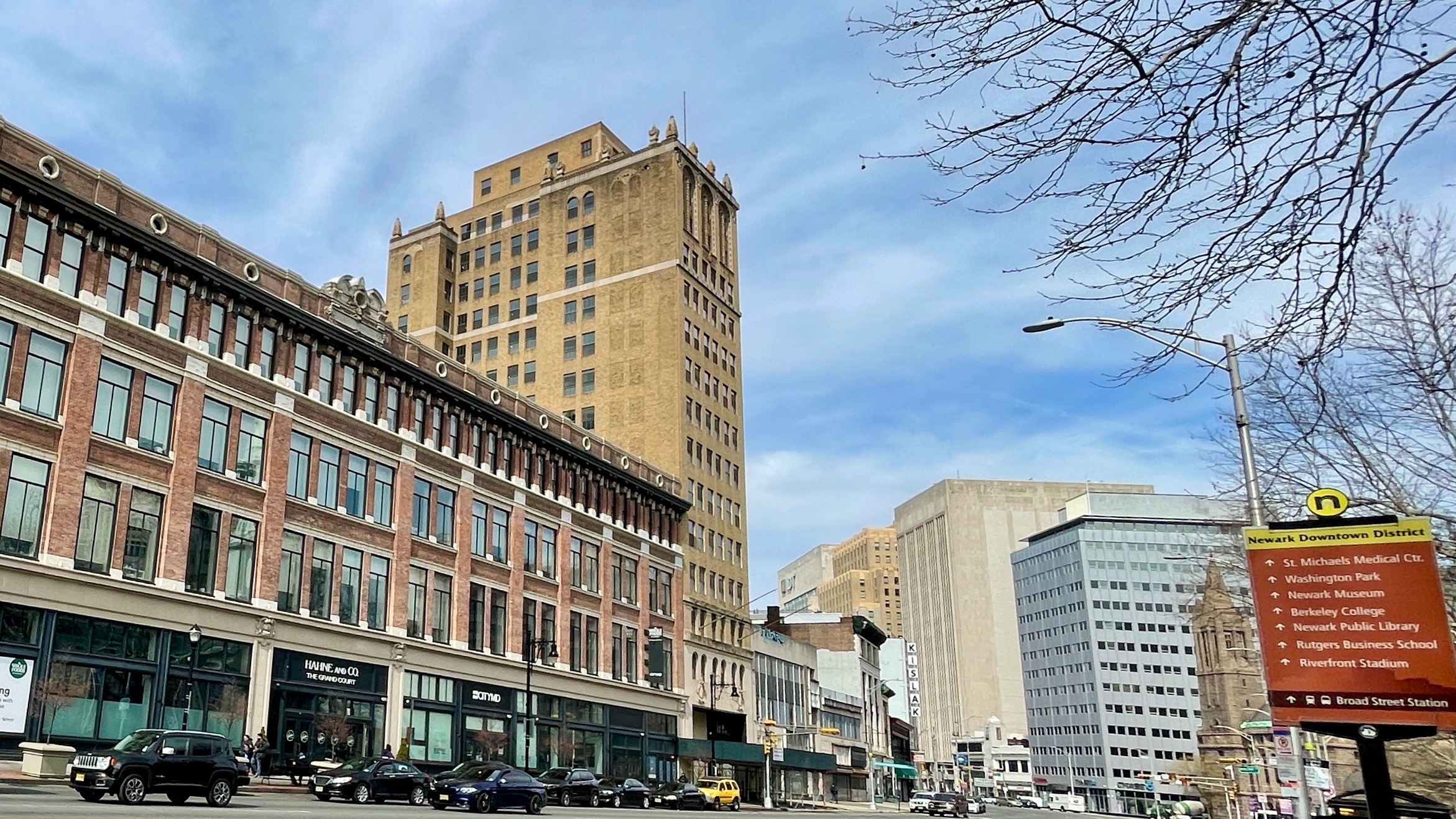
Hahne and Company and Griffith Building on Broad Street

== Features ==
In the southwestern part of the park is the large Wars of America monument, created by Gutzon Borglum, the sculptor of Mount Rushmore.

The sculpture itself forms the base of a large concrete sword built into the ground. The sword from the ground resembles a large dry fountain and from the air its shape is easily distinguished. The sword is about eighty yards long from the end of the statue to its tip; the blade is over ten feet across at its base. A bust of John F. Kennedy by Jacques Lipchitz was erected in 1965. The park also has an old drinking fountain with the phrase "My cup runneth over" carved around its base, and statues of Frederick Frelinghuysen and Philip Kearny. There is also an old fashioned carousel that was recently installed. A three-level underground parking garage is located beneath the park. The Military Park Newark Light Rail station lies under the southwest end of the park at Raymond Boulevard and Park Place.

Located in the middle of the park is the casual restaurant and outdoor bar the Burg, which opened in the fall of 2015.

== Doane Park ==
Doane Park is a tenth-acre triangular piece of land north of Military Park, where Broad Street and Park Place veer off and is separated from Military Park by Rector Street. A statue of Monsignor George Hobart Doane, for whom the park is named, was unveiled in 1908. Doane was a rector at St. Patrick's Pro-Cathedral and did much for the city including his work with the Essex County Park Commission.

== Events ==
- In 2011 and 2012, during the Occupy movement, there was an Occupy Newark encampment in Military Park.
- Afro Beat Fest is a new annual festival in downtown Newark of African and African diaspora culture including music, art, fashion, dance, crafts and cuisine. The inaugural Afro Beat Fest was held in the recently refurbished Military Park in July 2017. Afro Beat Fest is a reboot of an older festival that had begun in the 1980s called "Africa Newark," which had ended in 2006 after it lost city support. Mayor Ras Baraka said he and colleagues recalled the festival warmly from childhood and noted that the city worked with local organizers to revive it.
- Jazz concerts are sometimes performed in Military Park.
- On Thursdays during the fall, a farmers market is held on Park Place.

== Gallery ==
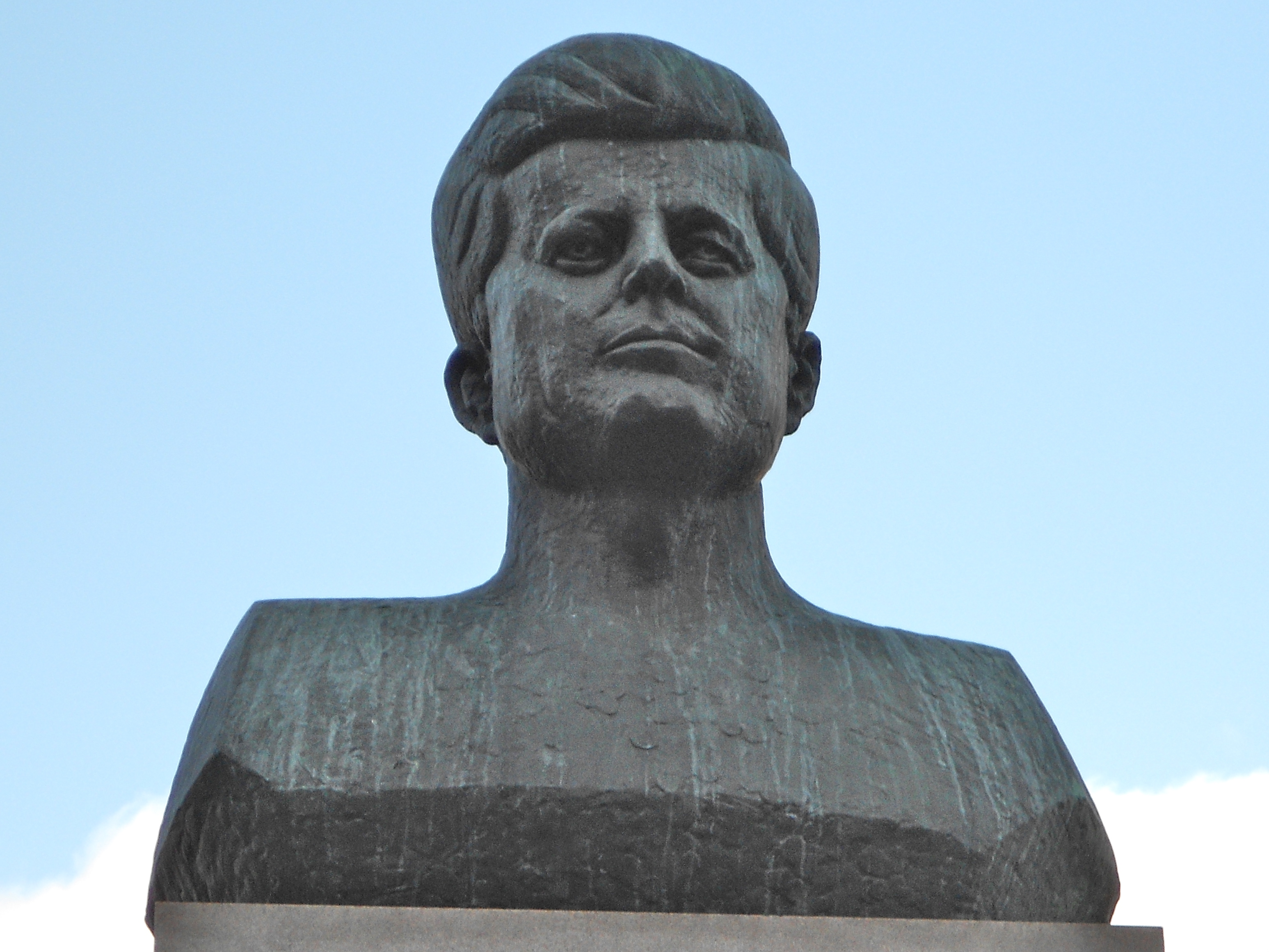
Bust of President Kennedy

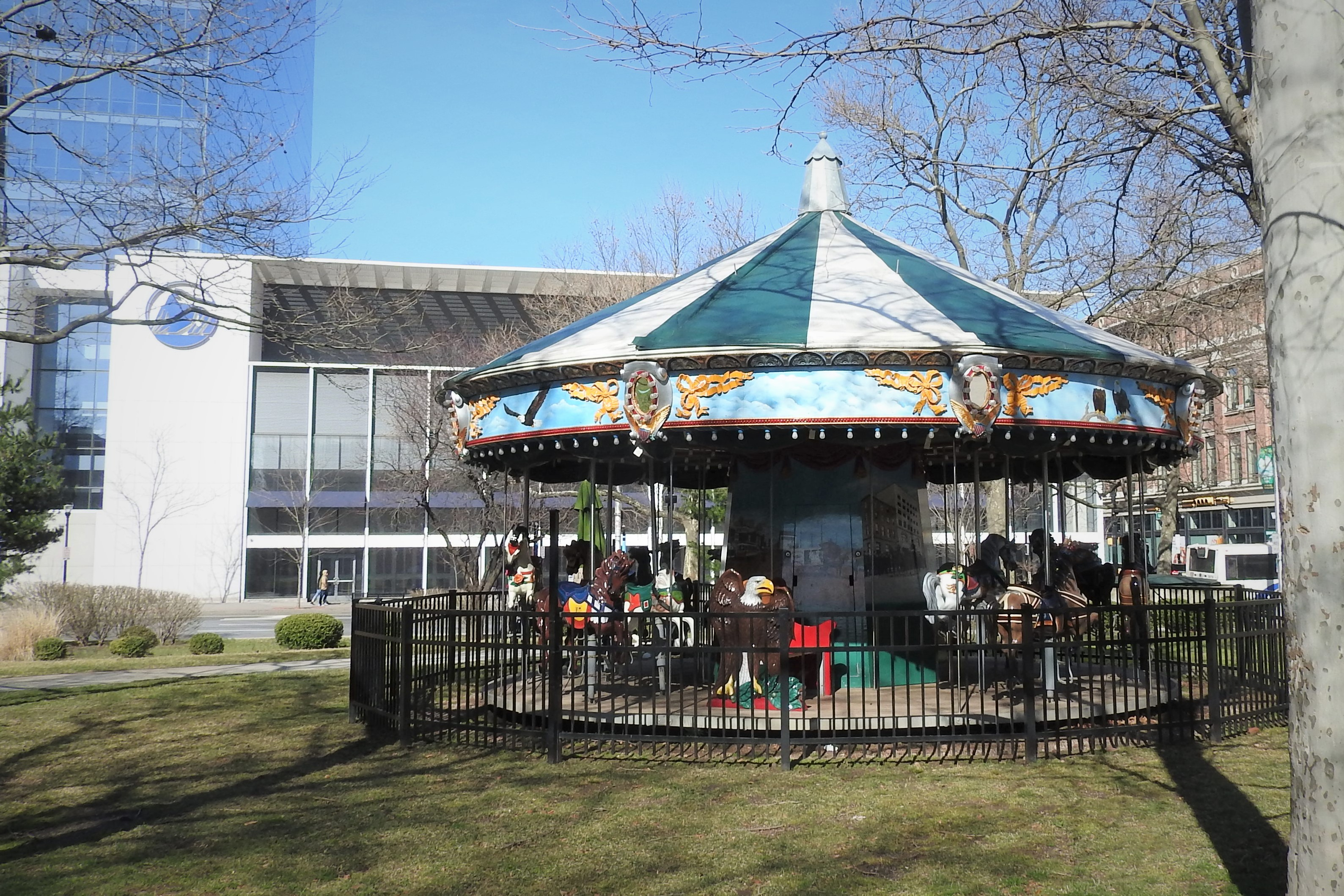
Merry-go-round in park

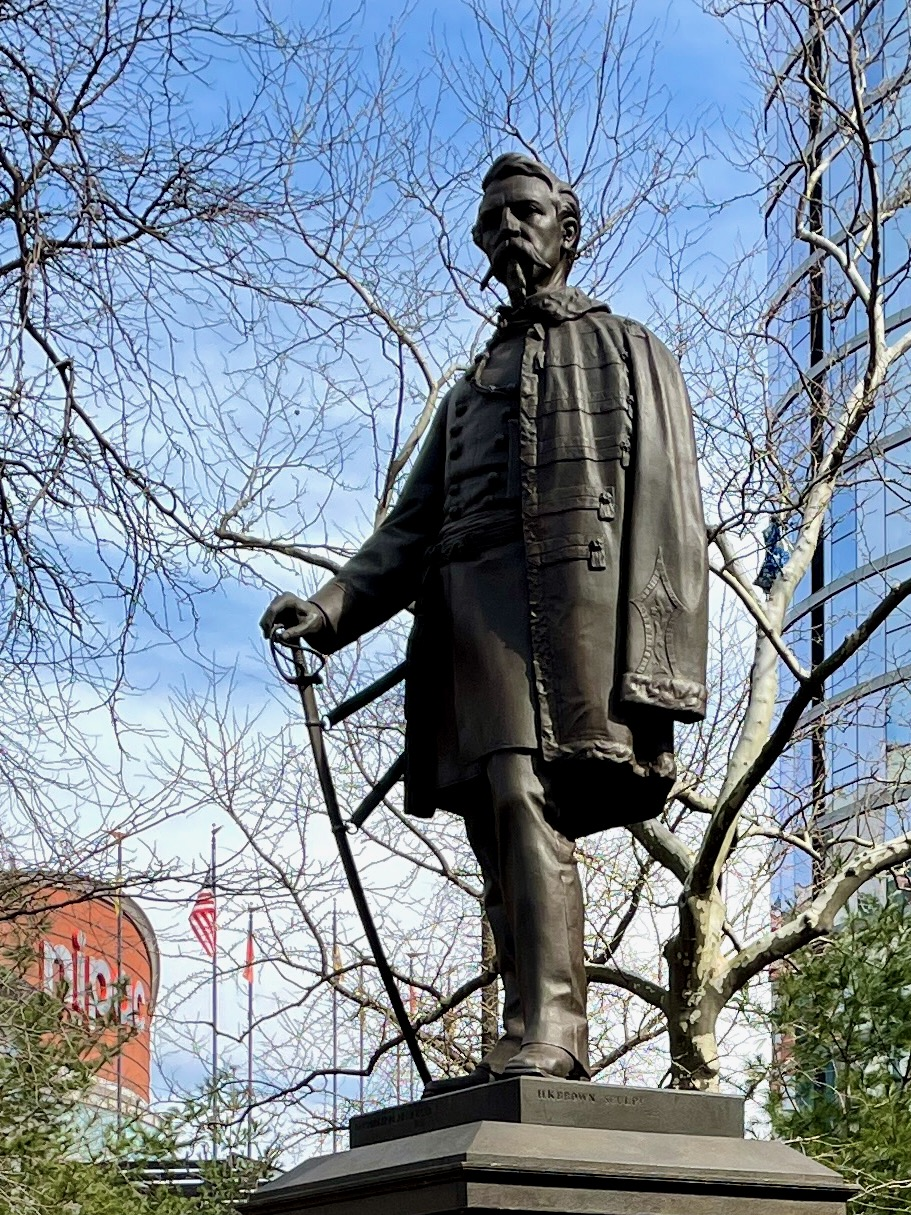
Statue of Philip Kearny by Henry Kirke Brown

== See also ==
- National Register of Historic Places listings in Essex County, New Jersey
- Lincoln Park, Newark
- Triangle Park (Newark)
- Washington Park (Newark)
