= Hahne and Company =

Department store chain in New Jersey

Hahne & Company
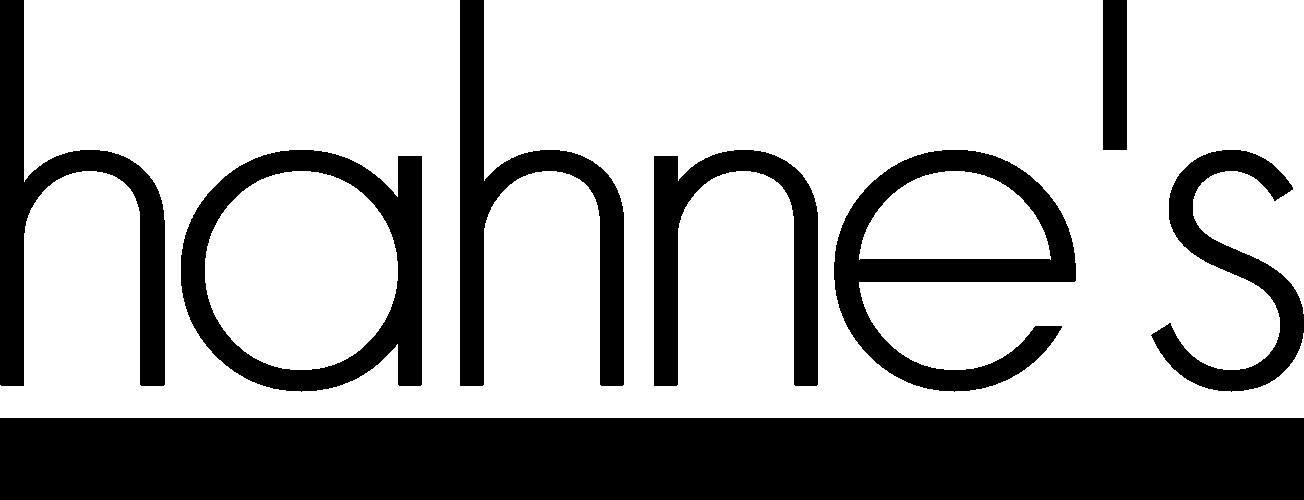

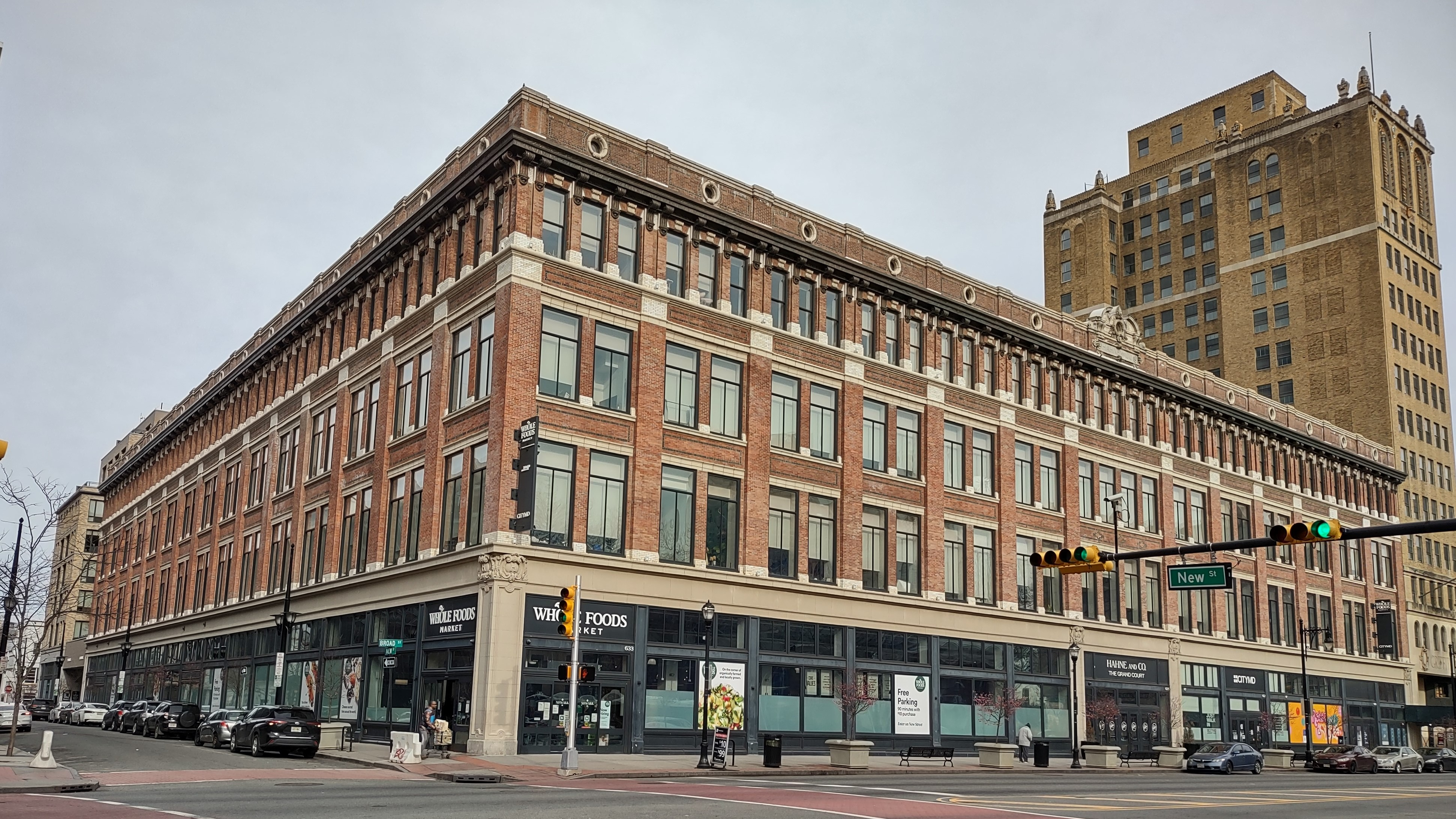
- Exterior of the former Hahne & Company Building flagship store in Newark, New Jersey (2023)
- Industry: retail
- Founded: 1858
- Defunct: 1989
- Fate: Merged into Lord & Taylor
- Successor: Lord & Taylor
- Headquarters: 609 Broad Street, Newark, NJ until 1987; Edison, NJ 1987 to 1989
- Key people: Julius Hahne, Alan Kane
- Products: Clothing, footwear, jewelry, furniture, bedding, beauty products, electronics
- Parent: Associated Dry Goods (1916-1986); May Company (1986-1989)

Hahne & Company (pronounced Hayne), commonly known as Hahne's, was a department store chain based in Newark, New Jersey. The chain had stores located throughout the central and northern areas of New Jersey.

== History ==
- Hahne and Company
- U.S. National Register of Historic Places
- U.S. Historic district – Contributing property
- New Jersey Register of Historic Places
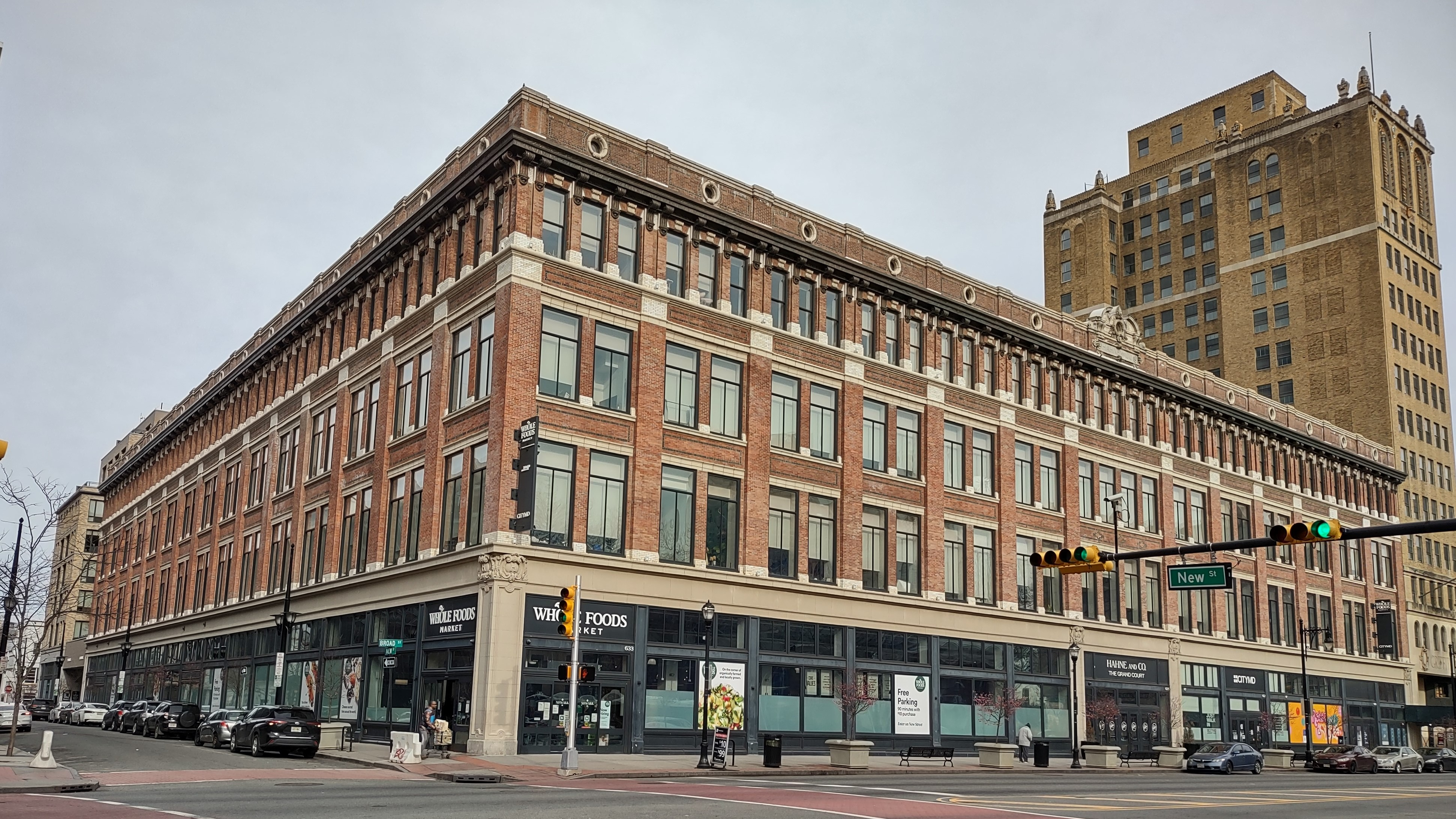
- 609 Broad Street

- Location within Essex County, New Jersey Location within New Jersey Location within the United States
- Location: 609 Broad Street; Newark, New Jersey
- Coordinates: 40°44′25″N 74°10′12″W
- Area: 2.3 acres (0.93 ha)
- Built: 1901
- Architect: Goldwin Starrett
- Architectural style: Renaissance
- Part of: Military Park Commons Historic District (ID04000649)
- NRHP reference No.: 94001005
- NJRHP No.: 1264

Significant dates
- Added to NRHP: August 30, 1994
- Designated CP: June 18, 2004
- Designated NJRHP: June 28, 1994

The firm was founded by Julius Hahne in 1858 as a specialty store which by the early 20th century had grown into a full-line department store. The store's motto was "The Store With The Friendly Spirit", and it became known as the "carriage trade" store in Newark.

In 1901, a modern flagship store designed by architect Goldwin Starrett was opened at 609 Broad Street by Military Park in downtown Newark. It was added to the National Register of Historic Places on August 30, 1994, for its significance in commerce and social history. It was added as a contributing property to the Military Park Commons Historic District on June 18, 2004.

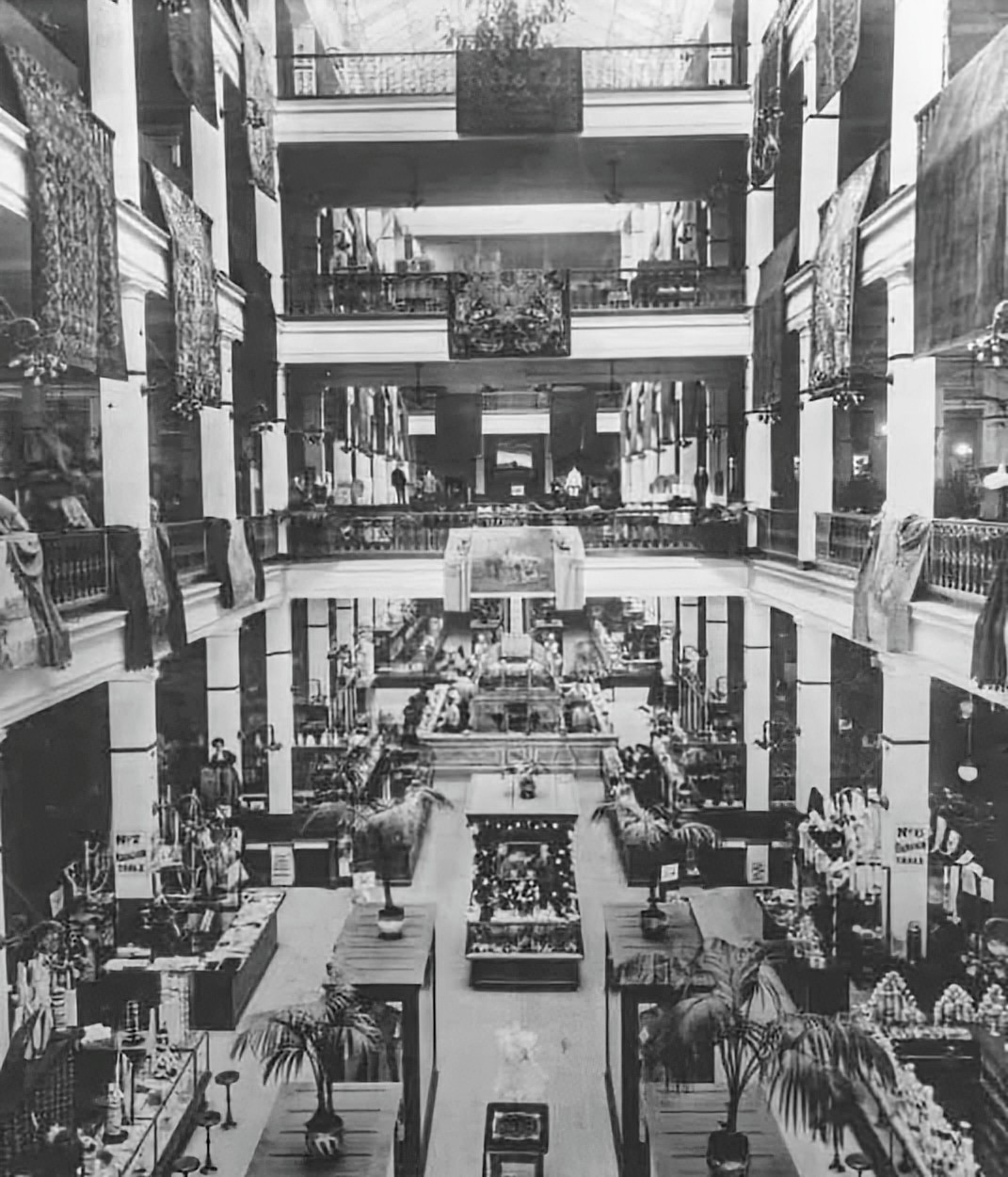
609 Broad Street in 1903

Occupying a 2.4-acre (9,700 m^{2}) site, this single building contained 441,000 square feet (41,000 m^{2}) of selling space spread over five floors (basement through 4th floor), with an atrium in the center of the building which ran from the street floor to the 4th floor. An extensive Budget Store operated in the basement level until it was folded in the mid 1970s. The store also contained two popular dining rooms, the more formal "Pine Room" located on the street floor, and the counter-style "Maple Room" (located in the basement), which was very popular with downtown office workers. The "Maple Room" closed in the early 1980s when the basement level was closed as a selling floor, while the "Pine Room" remained open until the entire store was closed in 1987. A third restaurant was available for employees. A Merry-Go-Round was in the basement and operated during the Christmas season when the Newark store was in its heyday. Hahne's also operated a furniture warehouse a few blocks away from the Newark location.

In 1916, Hahne's became one of the founding members of Associated Dry Goods (ADG).

In 1929, Hahne's was the first of Newark's department stores to open a branch on Church Street in Montclair.

=== Suburban growth ===
Starting in the 1950s, the company began to focus slowly on suburban growth. The Montclair store was replaced with a larger full-line branch, designed by Fellheimer & Wagner, with Roland Wank, and the original location became Hahne's Budget Store. In 1963, a location in Westfield was added. The firm did not enter the growing mall market in New Jersey until the 1970s, and this cost the chain valuable time in keeping up with its competitors.

Hahne's remained focused on its Newark flagship store in the 1960s. The Montclair store was built too small to be a true department store, Management was so pressed for selling space in Montclair that it had to take their Christmas decorations to the Newark flagship just to store them. Although the Westfield location was attractive, Hahne's lacked the customer base to compete with the nearby Lord & Taylor in Millburn, Saks Fifth Avenue in Springfield and Bonwit Teller, B. Altman and Company and Bloomingdale's in Short Hills.

Newark declined badly in the 1960s and 1970s and the division, with most of its sales volume coming from the Newark flagship, went down with it. The Newark location lacked parking and was in a neighborhood that suburban shoppers felt was unsafe. Alan Kane, the executive in charge of their repositioning had some good ideas but they were too little and too late to save the chain. The stores that Kane opened were eventually closed and were converted to Lord & Taylor locations, or by other chains that bought them.

During the course of the 1970s and 1980s, the chain attempted to reach out to a broader shopper demographic with mixed results. In 1978, parent ADG appointed Alan Kane, a graduate of Wharton School of Business, as CEO of Hahne & Company. Kane oversaw the planning and opening of two new locations (Woodbridge Center and Rockaway Townsquare), and he steered the company toward a more focused, upper-market clientele. The Livingston Mall location was branded the company's "flagship" during this time.

=== Reorganization ===
In mid-1986, Hahne & Co. announced a major reorganization that would see not only the downtown Newark location close, but the corporate offices would leave Newark as well. ADG acquired the large Gimbels location at the Garden State Plaza, with plans to use two floors for Hahne's first location in Bergen County, and the lower level as Hahne's temporary corporate offices. Shortly after this plan was announced, ADG was sold to the May Department Stores Company, and per May Co.'s policy, major plans were put on hold until May's officers had a chance to review the details. After careful consideration by May, the Newark store was closed in 1987 and later in the same year a two-level location opened in the former Gimbels Garden State Plaza location. Hahne's offices were relocated to leased space in Woodbridge Township, near the company's distribution center that had opened in 1985.

Kane contemplated running Hahne's as a more contemporary focused chain but left after May had changed the overall direction of the company. Moreover, Hahne's had become unprofitable as it shifted its attention on suburban shopping malls. By 1989, May decided to retire the brand and convert some of the stores into new locations for its Lord & Taylor banner. The nine locations of Hahne's were closed at dates varying from April to June 1989. Six of these stores would end up becoming Lord & Taylor locations. These Lord & Taylor stores inaugurated between the fall of 1989 and the summer of 1990.

=== Former buildings ===
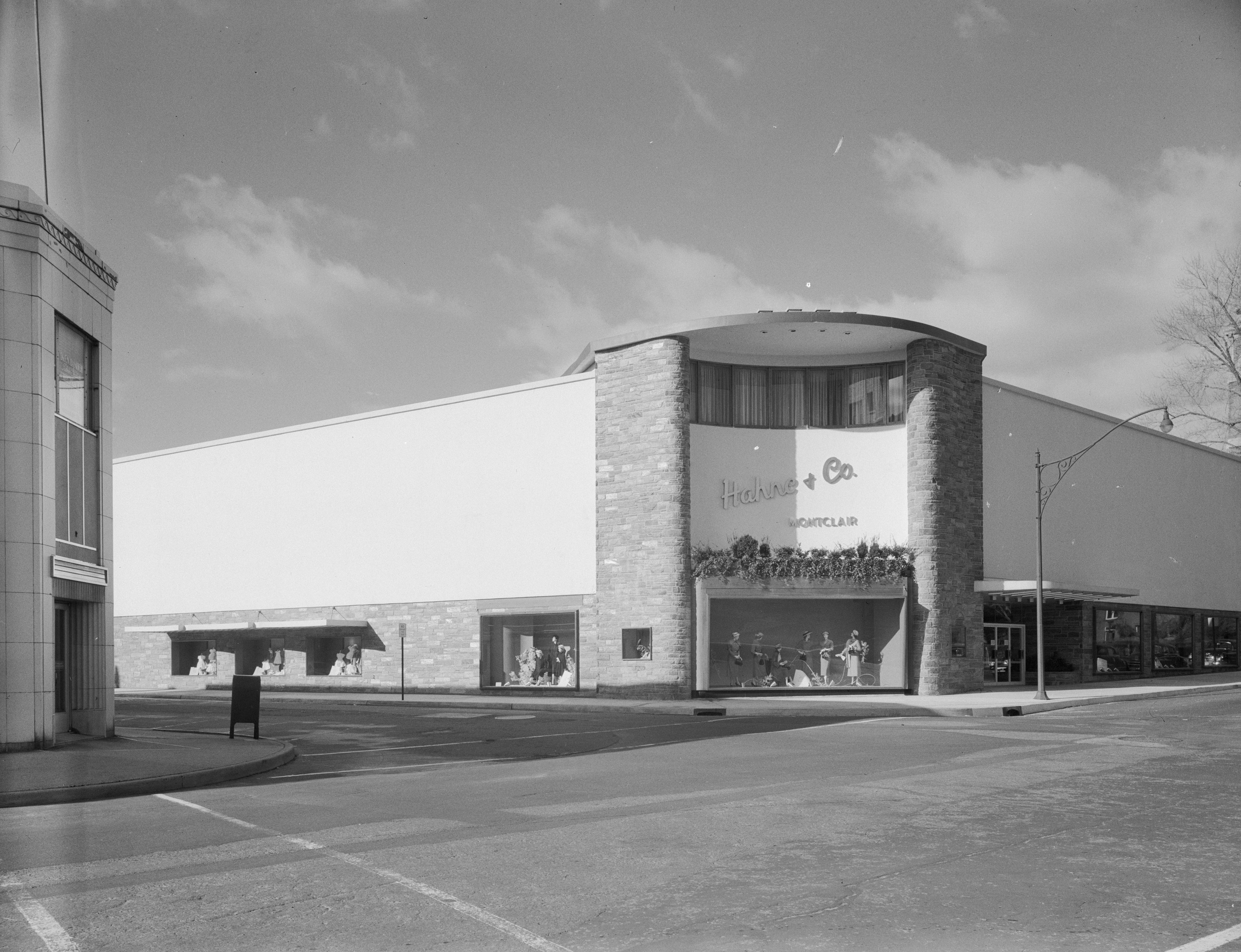
Montclair store in 1951

The architecturally significant 1951 Montclair store, empty since 1989, was demolished in 2004 and replaced by a condominium housing development known as Siena at Montclair that opened in 2007.

In January 2013, after sitting empty for almost 30 years, it was announced that the Newark flagship store would be renovated with a Whole Foods Market and retail arcade on the ground floor and 83 residential units above. A nine-story addition with 77 residential units was constructed on the Halsey Street side of the building and underground parking as well. On October 9, 2014, nearby Rutgers University announced that they would open a new arts center on three floors of the Hahne and Company building. The arts center will be called "Express Newark", and will include an arts incubator, media center, design consortium, print shop, portrait studio, lecture hall, as well as new exhibition and performance spaces for artists. The university has reached out to community partners to collaborate on the project. L+M Development partnering with Prudential and Goldman Sachs broke ground in June 2015. The building has 60% dedicated market rate housing units and 40% affordable units to promote the healthy revitalization of Newark while serving those who already live in Newark. The atrium featuring a grand staircase is capped by a steel-and-glass skylight and serves as the focal point for the redevelopment. The complex also has a CityMD urgent care doctors office, Barnes & Noble bookstore, an upscale restaurant opened by celebrity chef Marcus Samuelson, and other businesses including a Sweetwaters Coffee, an Indian restaurant called Curry Up, an upscale wines and liquor establishment called CoolVines, and an Industrial Bank branch. The building reopened in January 2017.

== See also ==
- National Register of Historic Places listings in Essex County, New Jersey
