= List of tallest buildings in Newark =

Downtown Newark with Newark Riverfront Park on the Passaic River in 2016 (Use cursor to identify)

Newark, the largest city in New Jersey and second largest in the New York metropolitan area, is one of the United States' major air, shipping, and rail hubs. Its central business district has long been a commercial, retail, and entertainment center with a distinctive skyline.

Newark was founded in 1666, and its downtown grew around the site of the early settlement at Four Corners. Early high-rises were developed there and at Military Park during the economic boom of the Roaring Twenties. Several buildings have flags rising from their rooftops; since the mid-2000s numerous buildings have been re-lit and made more prominent. In the New Newark era (1960s-1970s) modernist buildings went up, particularly around Washington Park. In the post-industrial-high tech era, development was concentrated in the Gateway District near Penn Station, with many buildings clad in reflective glass. Clusters of residential high-rises are found throughout the city, particularly near Weequahic Park and Branch Brook Park. Since the 2000s numerous commercial buildings have been converted to apartments and since the 2010s Newark has seen growth in the construction of residential high-rises downtown.

Three ZPMC Super-Post-Panamax container cranes each measuring 561 ft (171 m) at Port Newark are the tallest structures in the city.

== Skyline ==
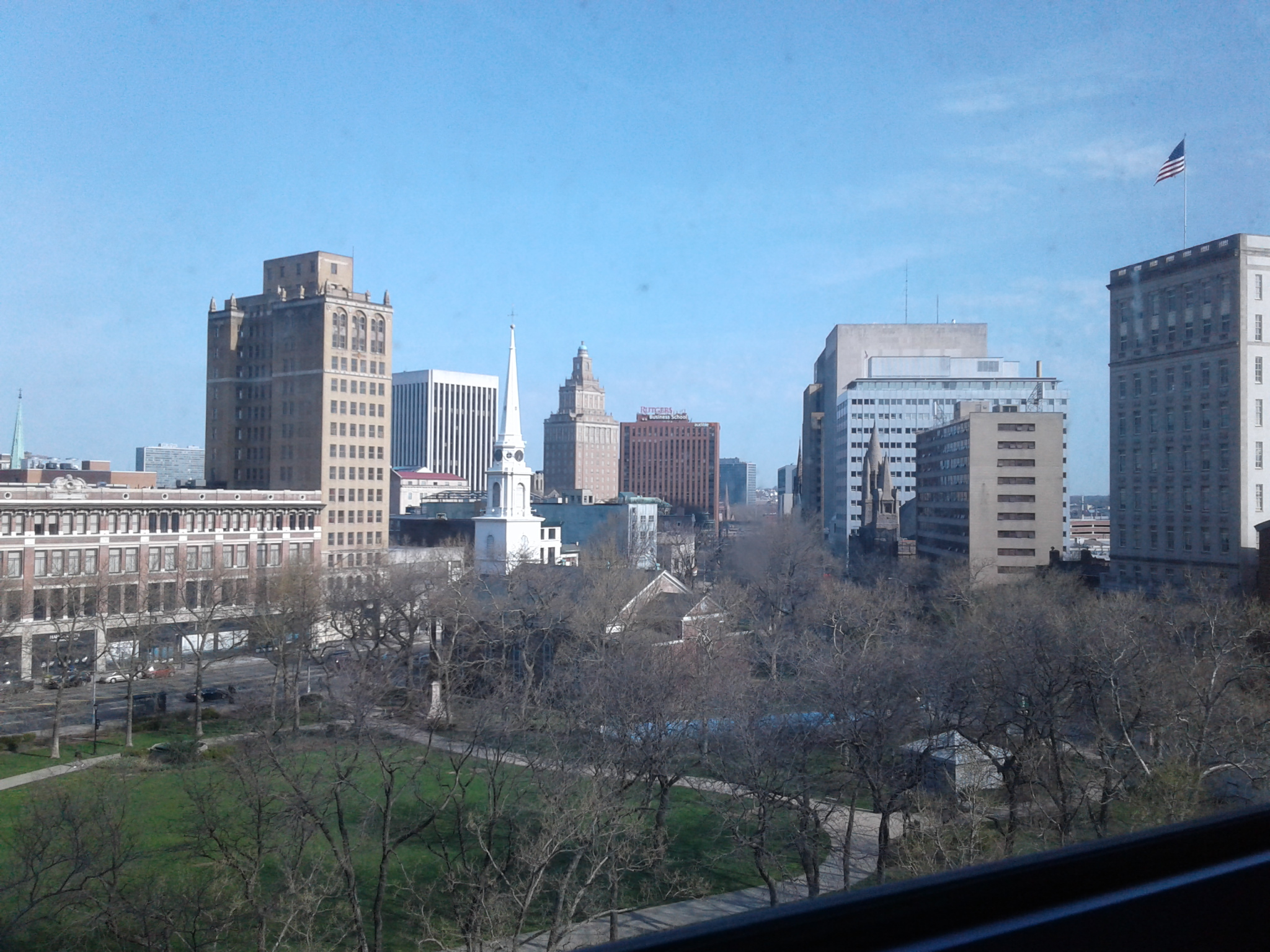
North of Military Park

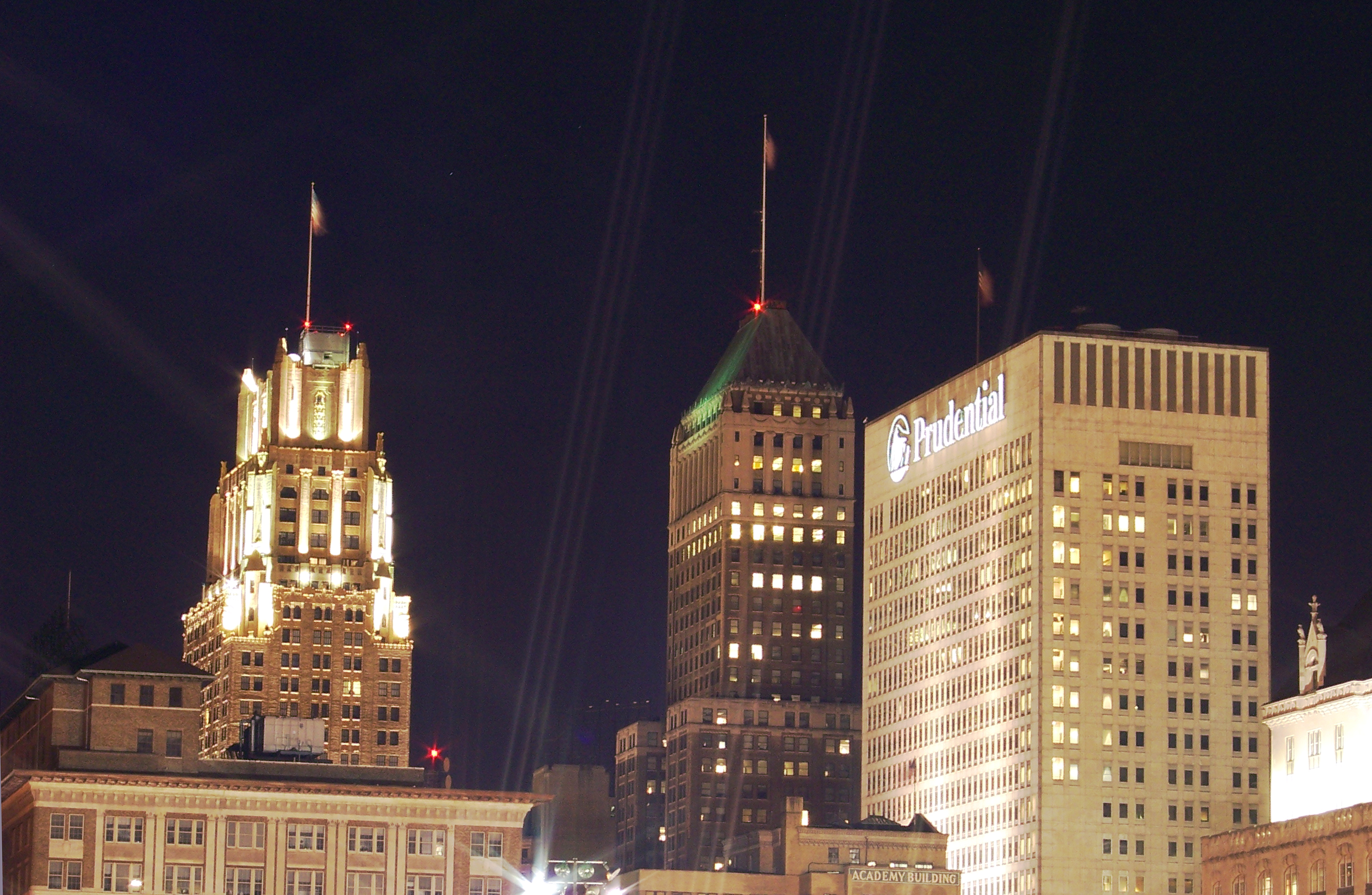
Eleven80, National Newark, Prudential

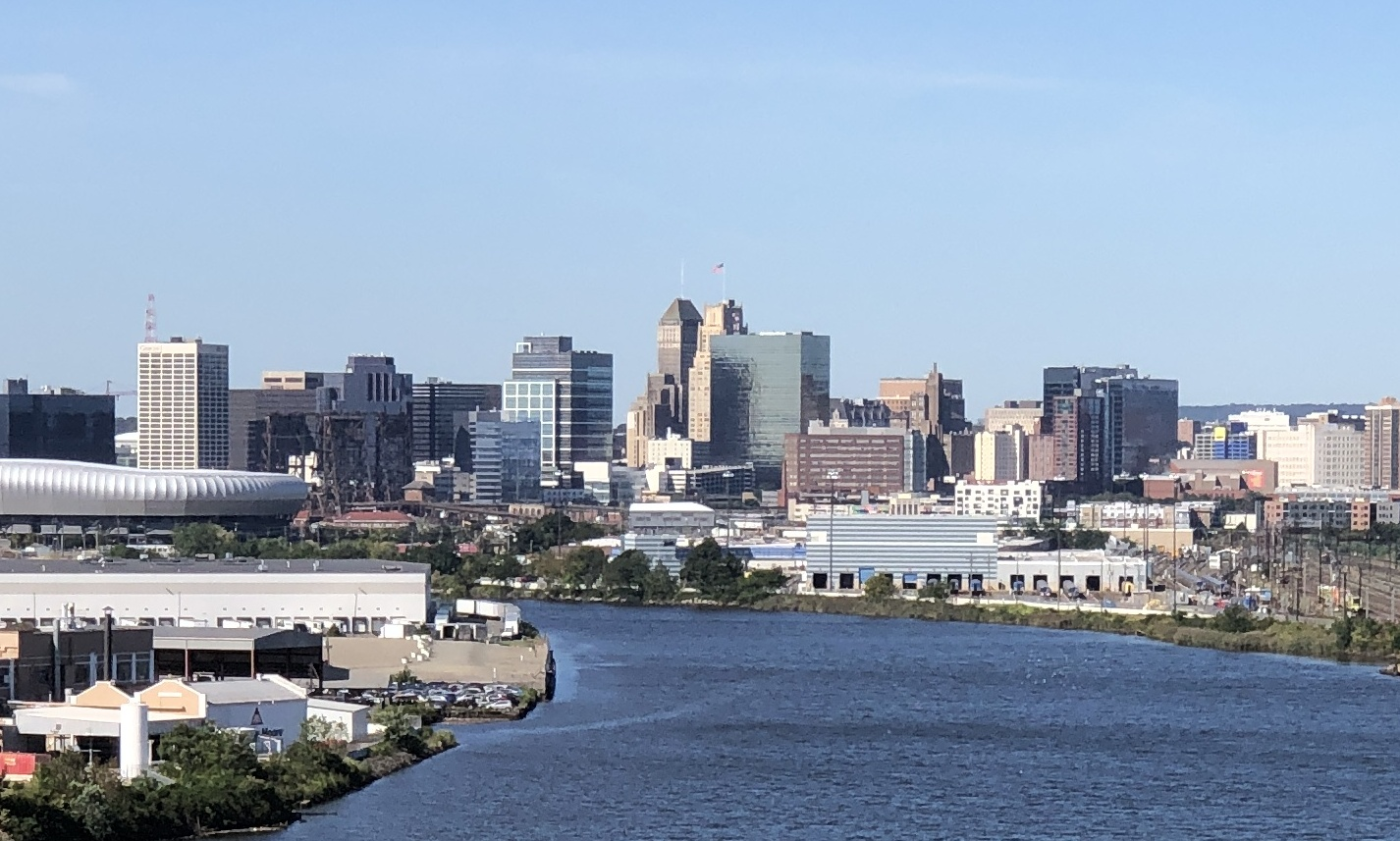
South of Bridge Street Bridge

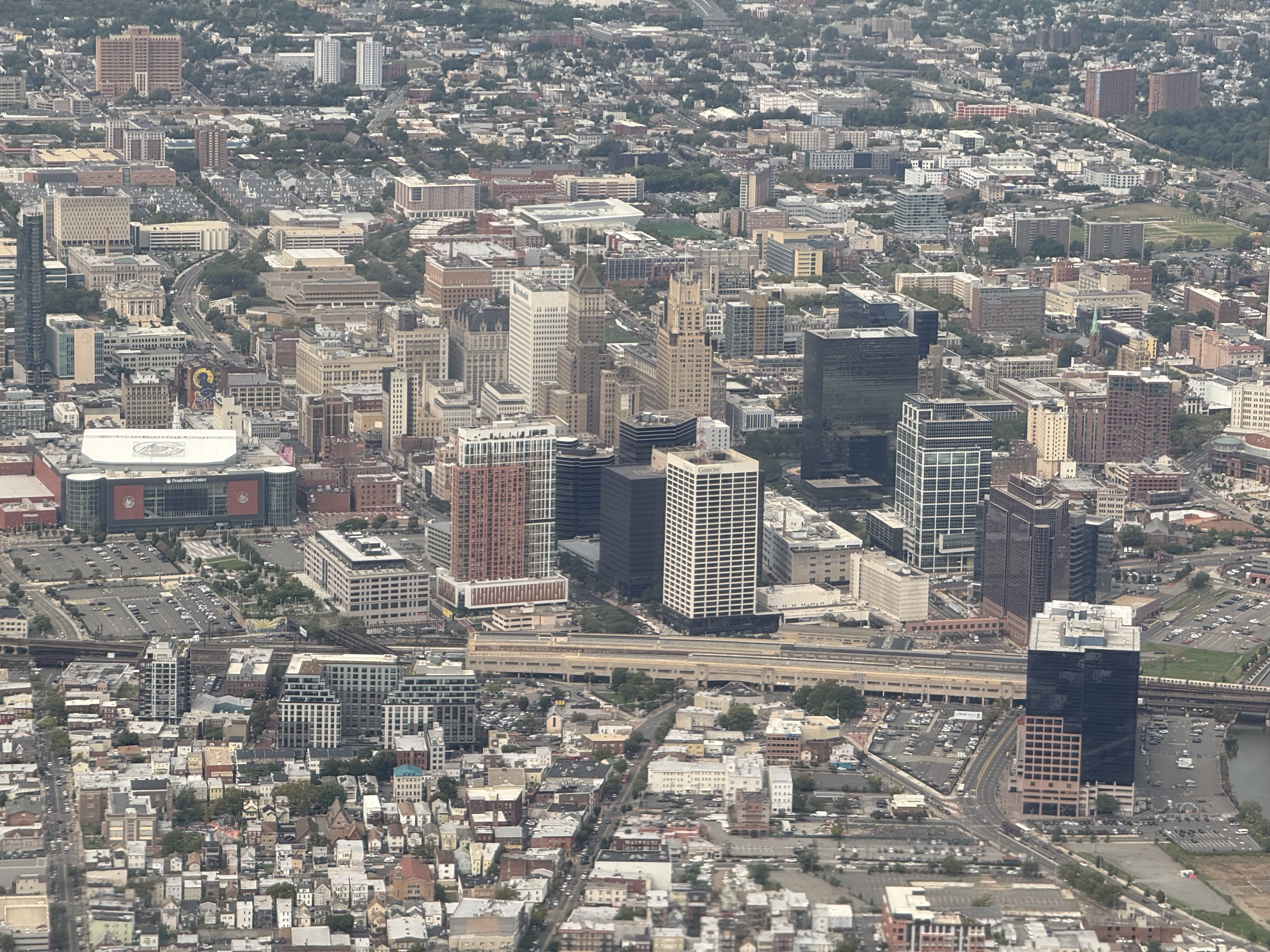
Aerial view looking west to Downtown 2025

== Tallest buildings ==
This list ranks Newark buildings that stand at least 210 feet (64 m) tall, based on standard height measurement. This includes spires and architectural details but does not include flagpoles, antenna masts, cellular towers or permanent cranes. An equal sign (=) following a rank indicates the same height of two or more buildings. The year indicates when the building was topped out or completed. Estimated height is generally taken from the Council on Vertical Urbanism, which bases it on floor count and the height of similar buildings.

Was the tallest building in city upon completion
Indicates buildings that have been architecturally topped out but not yet completed.

Rank	Name	image	Height ft / m	Floors	Year	Notes
1	National Newark Building		466 ft (142 m)	35	1931	John H. & Wilson C. Ely, architects. Tallest building in Newark since its completion in 1931. Tallest building constructed in New Jersey in the 1930s; remained tallest building in the state for 58 years, until 1989. Its steel flagpole rises 113 ft (34 m) above the roof line, to a height of 578 ft (176 m) and also serves as an antenna.
2	Halo Tower 1		454 ft (138 m) -	38	2024 (topped out)	INOA Architecture. Tallest building constructed in Newark in the 2020s. Tallest residential building in Newark. The building's permanent maintenance crane rises to 467 ft (142 m) As of 2025, the project is stalled due to legal issues around financing.
3	Eleven 80		448 ft (137 m)	36	1930	Grad Associates, architects. Originally known as the Lefcourt Building. Tallest building in New Jersey from 1930 to 1931. Second tallest in Newark from 1931 to 2024. After conversion to apartments was until 2024 the tallest residential building in the city. The 120-foot flagpole is embedded through the 36th, 37th, and 38th floors.
4	Prudential Plaza		374 ft (114 m)	24	1960	Voorhees, Walker, Smith, Smith and Haines, architects. Headquarters of Prudential Financial. Tallest building constructed in New Jersey in the 1960s.
5	Iconiq 777		371 ft (113 m) (estimated)	33	2022	Beyer Blinder Belle, architects. Residential building also known as 777 McCarter Highway. Developed by Boraie in partnership with Shaquille O'Neal
6	80 Park Plaza		360 ft (110 m)	26	1980	Tallest building constructed in Newark in the 1980s. Headquarters of Public Service Enterprise Group, which replaced the Newark Public Service Terminal.
7	Gateway Center I		359 ft (109 m)	30	1971	Victor Gruen, architect. Tallest building constructed in Newark in the 1970s.
8	Zion Towers		351 ft (107 m)	28	1969	Romolo Botelli, architect. Residential, renovated 2019-20
9	Newark Legal Center		329 ft (100 m)	20	2000	Grad Associates, architects. Tallest building constructed in Newark in the 2000s.
10=	One Newark Center		326 ft (99 m)	22	1992	Grad Associates, architects. Tallest building constructed in Newark in the 1990s. Home of Seton Hall University School of Law.
10=	Ruth Bader Ginsburg Hall		326 ft (99 m)	16	1930	John H. & Wilson C. Ely, architects. Originally known as the American Insurance Company Building. Converted to residences by Rutgers University–Newark; renamed in 2023 to honor Ruth Bader Ginsburg
11	Airport Traffic Control Tower at Newark Liberty International Airport	NewarkAirportControlTower 01	325 ft (99 m)	n/a	2002	Newark Airport has had four air traffic control towers.
12=	Cosmo 440; 440 Elizabeth Avenue		313 feet (95 m)	25	1970	Formerly known as Carmel Towers the residential building was vacated in 2011; it was rehabilitated and reopened in October 2025.
12=	Prudential Tower		313 feet (95 m)	20	2015	Kohn Pedersen Fox, architects. Tallest building constructed in Newark in the 2010s.
13	Prudential Building		300 feet (91 m)	21	1942	Tallest building constructed in Newark in the 1940s.
14	Gateway III		296 ft (90 m)	18	1985	Grad Associates, architects.
15	3 Penn Plaza East		292 ft (89 m) (estimated)	21	1993	Horizon Blue Cross and Blue Shield of New Jersey
16	Parq 930		289 ft (88 m)	25	2025 (topped out)	Marchetto Higgins Steve, architects. At 930 McCarter Highway, across from NJPAC/Center Street station, at Newark Riverfront Park
17	ArtSide		284 ft (87 m)	25	2025 (topped out)	Skidmore Owings & Merrill, architects. On the grounds of New Jersey Performing Arts Center west of McCarter Highway at NJPAC/Center Street station
18	Gateway II		272 ft (83 m)	18	1972	Victor Gruen, architect.
19	Heritage Estates		269 ft (82 m) (estimated)	24	1965	Residential
20	Military Park Building		265 ft (81 m)	21	1926	Polhemus & Coffin, architects. Tallest building in New Jersey upon its completion from 1926 to 1930. Tallest building constructed in Newark in the 1920s.
21	Cathedral Basilica of the Sacred Heart		263 ft (80 m)	n/a	1954	Height of the flèche (the church's copper spire) is 263 ft (80 m); each of its two towers are 232 ft (71 m) tall
22=	Walker House		260 ft (79 m)	20	1929	Ralph Thomas Walker, architect. Originally the New Jersey Bell Headquarters Building, it was converted to a residential building and renamed the Walker House in 2017.
22=	24 Commerce Street		260 ft (79 m)	19	1926	Frederic Charles Hirons and Ethan Allen Dennison, architects
23	Dr. Stanley S. Bergen Building		255 ft (78 m)	16	1954	Tallest building constructed in Newark in the 1950s. Named for Stanley S. Bergen Jr. and now part of New Jersey Medical School.
24	One Theater Square		254 ft (77 m) (estimated)	22	2018	BLT Architects, architects. Residential building developed as public-private partnership of New Jersey Performing Arts Center and Dranoff Properties
25	33 Washington Street		251 ft (77 m)	20	1971	Welton Becket, architect.
26=	Mutual Benefit Life Building		246 ft (75 m)	20	1957	Gruzen & Partners, architects. Commissioned by Mutual Benefit Life, later headquarters of IDT Corporation
26=	One Washington Park		246 ft (75 m)	18	1983	Home to Rutgers Business School and Amazon's Audible.com.
26=	Elizabeth Towers		246 ft (75 m) (estimated)	22	1961	Residential
26=	Hallmark House		246 ft (75 m) (estimated)	22	1965	Residential
26=	50 Rector Park		246 feet (75 m) (estimated)	24	2018	Costas Kondylis, architect. Residential building developed in partnership with Shaquille O'Neal.
27=	550 Broad Street		243 ft (74 m)	19	1966	
27=	1-2 Penn Plaza East		243 ft (74 m) (estimated)	17	1993	Part of two building complex on shared four-story base originally developed by Hartz Mountain; NJ Transit Headquarters until 2024.
28	165 Halsey Street		226 ft (69 m) (roof)	14	1923	Jarvis Hunt, architect. Tallest building in New Jersey between 1923 and 1926. Originally Bamberger's, converted to carrier hotel
29	Oak Tower		221 ft (67 m)	17	2026 (topped out); expected completion 2027	Niles Bolton Associates, architects. Student housing in 17 story residential tower for New Jersey Institute of Technology
30=	Peter W. Rodino Federal Building		220 ft (67 m)	16	1967	Lehman and W.O. Biernacki-Poray, architects.
30=	Gibraltar Building		220 ft (67 m)	14	1927	Cass Gilbert, architect. Home to Wilentz Justice Complex since 1997.
30=	Firemen's Insurance Building		220 ft (67 m)	19	1910	Marvin, Davis & Turton, architects. Tallest building in New Jersey upon its completion in 1910 until 1923.
31=	Griffith Building		210 ft (64 m)	15	1927	George Elwood Jones, architect. Vacant; as of 2025 slated to conversion to residence with commercial space.
31=	Newark Urby		210 ft (64 m)	18	1930	Originally built as a parking deck, converted to residences in 2021.

== Tallest under construction, approved, and proposed ==
Grant USA Tower was a proposed building which would have been one of world's tallest. Buildings of at least 210 feet (64 m) tall that are under construction, approved, or proposed:

=== Under construction ===
Name	Height ft (m)	Floors	Year (projected)	Notes	Site
Summit Tower	489 ft (149 m)	41	2028	Within the Four Corners Historic District between the Newark Paramount Theatre and Prudential Center. Originally planned at 46 stories,(508 ft (155 m) tall.) reduced to 41, with an elevation of 514.65 ft (157 m), to comply with the city’s Landmarks and Historic Preservation Commission, which decided the building should not rise higher than the highest building in the historic district — the National Newark Building with an elevation of 515 ft (157 m).	
Metropolitan Tower	308 ft (94 m) -	22	2026	Demolition of old Metropolitan Building on Washington Street, facade of which was originally planned to be incorporated into new tower.	
22 Fulton	257 ft (78 m)	22	2028	Beyer Blinder Belle, architects. Residential building nearby McCarter Highway on Fulton Street is planned to have over 300 units; received tax credits from the New Jersey Economic Development Authority in 2024.	

=== Approved ===
Name	Height ft (m)	Floors	Year (projected)	Notes	Site
Halo Tower 2	619 ft (189 m)	53	2027/2028	Between Teachers Village and the Essex County Government Complex, part of the 3-tower complex on a 6-story base.	
900 Broad Street	610 ft (186 m)	53		At Broad and Green streets across from Newark City Hall. Originally proposed in 2019 as 51 stories but was approved as 61 story tower to have 552 units. New plans calls for a 53 story tower with 446 residential units and 44 hotel rooms.	
Halo Tower 3	587 ft (179 m)	52	2027/2028	Part of the 3 tower complex on 6 story base.	
Mulberry Pointe	586 ft (179 m)	51		Opposite Government Center at 315 Mulberry Street, two residential towers with over 1,008 rental units.	
Arc Tower	520 ft (158 m)	45	2026	571 Broad Street between Military Park and Harriet Tubman Square	
Nova Towers	487 ft (148 m)	42		Twin towers in the Teachers Village neighborhood at Halsey and William streets. Both towers are set to have 712 units.	
20 Atlantic Street	431 ft (131 m)	40		Four 40-story towers along McCarter Highway clustered around Atlantic Street station east of former IDT Corporation headquarters, which would also be converted to residences and retail space.	
48 Branford Place	347 ft (106 m)	32		Proposed 32 story 441 residential Tower near Teachers Village.	
Paramount Tower	310 ft (94 m)	28		Residential buildings within Four Corners Historic District at site of the disused Newark Paramount Theatre, incorporating its facade.	
Iberia (phase one)	303 ft (92 m)	30		East of Newark Penn Station at 450 Market Street opposite Newark Riverfront Park in the Ironbound, two 30 story towers with "town square" pedestrian plaza at the 5th floor.	
Iberia (phase 2)	274 ft (84 m)	26		In the Ironbound; phase two of project are two 26 story towers on "town square" pedestrian plaza.	
CitiSquare (phase one)	244 ft (74 m)	18		At 10.5-acre (4.2 ha) site of demolished Bears & Eagles Riverfront Stadium and Club Zanzibar: seven 18 story buildings, three 37 story buildings, and one 19 story building.	
101 Market Street	234 ft (71 m)	22		Within Four Corners Historic District on the corner of Market and Washington Street. Part of RHB Millennium Project, originally proposed as 13 or 14 stories, later increased.	

=== Proposed ===
The Grant USA Tower was a 121-story skyscraper proposed in the 1980s.

Name	Height m/ft	Floors	Notes	Site
96 Clay Street		40	In the Lower Broadway neighborhood, just outside the central business district.	
56 Park Place	285 ft (87 m)	27	MVMK Architects. Across from Military Park, a 235 unit residential high rise tower. Received approval from the Newark Landmarks & Historic Preservation Commission in October 2024. Will incorporate existing facade.	
50 Jersey Street	274 ft (83 m)	25	MHS Architecture. East of Newark Penn Station at 50 Jersey Street next to Newark Riverfront Park in the Ironbound, a 25 story with 572 units recently proposed in a community benefits meeting.	

== Timeline of tallest buildings since 1868 ==
This lists buildings that once held the title of tallest building in Newark.

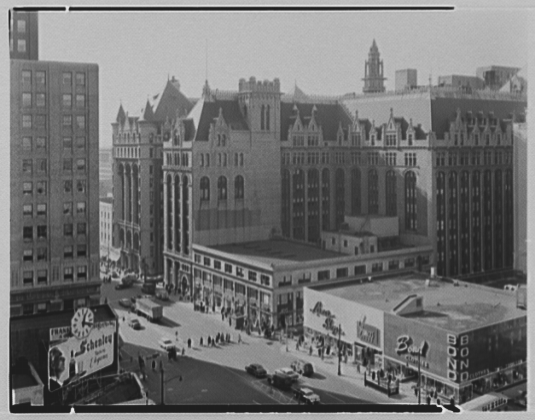
Prudential Home Office (1956)

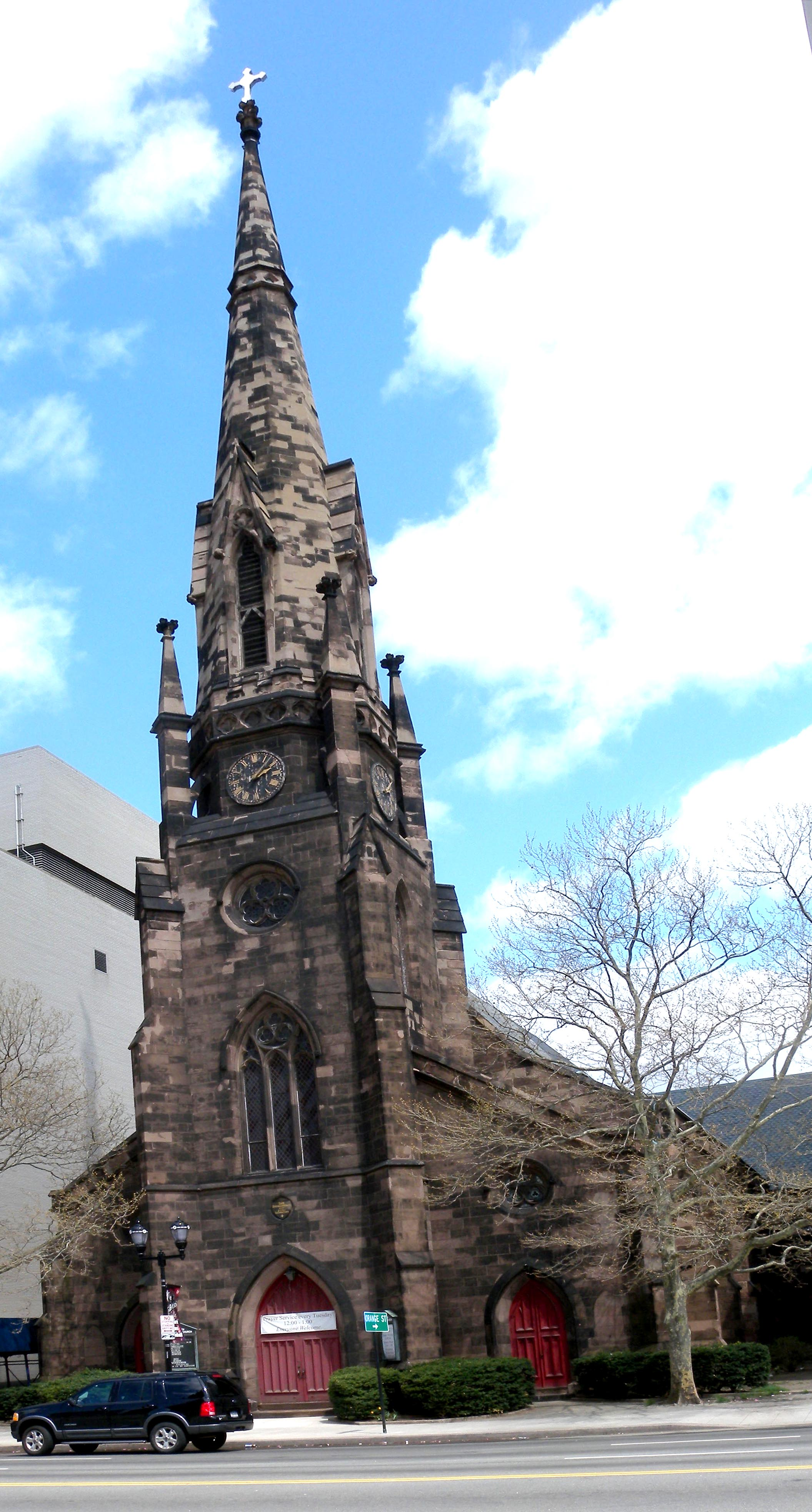
Newark North Reformed Church was once the tallest building in Newark

Name	Street address	Year built	Height ft / m	Floors	Notes
North Reformed Church	510 Broad Street	1868	185 / 50		
Prudential Main Building	Broad Street	1901	150 / 46	12	demolished in 1956
Firemen's Insurance Building	280 Broad Street	1910	220 / 67	19	
165 Halsey Street	165 Halsey Street	1923	226/69	14	
Military Park Building	60 Park Place	1926	265 / 81	21	
Eleven 80	1180 Raymond Boulevard	1930	448 / 137	35	
National Newark Building	744 Broad Street	1931	465 / 142	34	

== See also ==
- Robert Treat Center
- Pavilion and Colonnade Apartments
- List of Art Deco architecture in New Jersey
