= Mulberry Commons =

Public park in Newark, New Jersey

Coordinates: 40°43′59″N 74°10′3″W

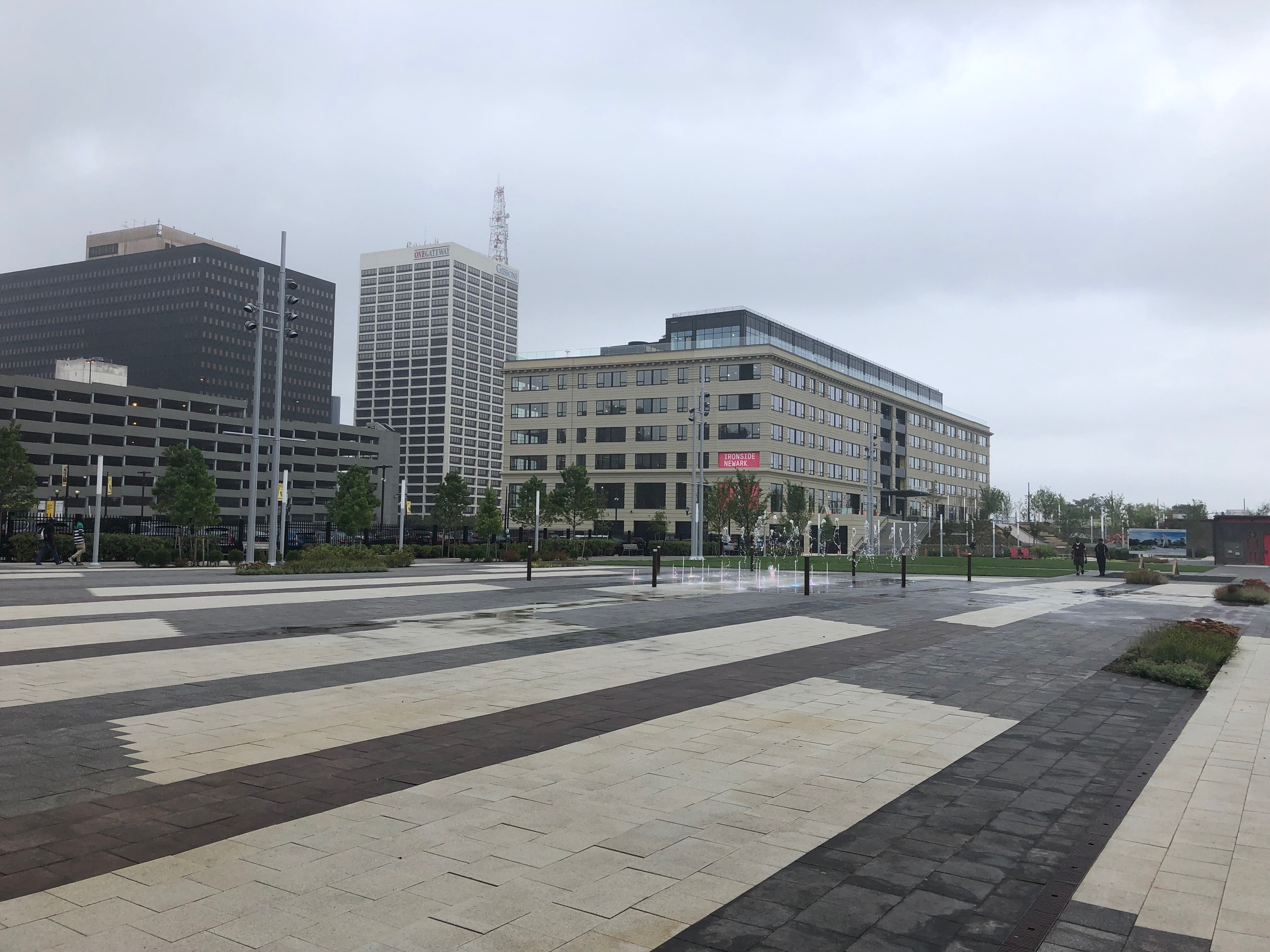
View of Mulberry Commons to Gateway and Ironside (2019)

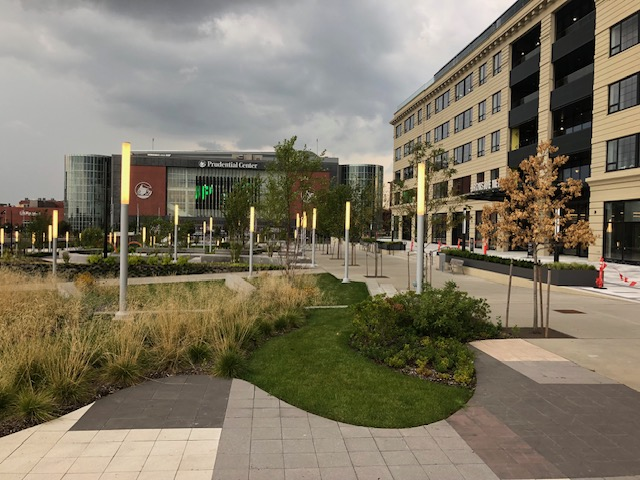
Mulberry Commons with Ironside and Prudential Center

Mulberry Commons is an urban square and public park in Newark, New Jersey that opened in 2019. The Mulberry Commons Pedestrian Bridge broke ground in 2023 and has not yet begun construction.

== Background ==
It was first proposed by Jerry Gottesman of Edison Parking in 2005 to provide a publicly-funded front yard for his private land holdings, provide a new direct elevated skybridge access from Newark Penn Station to parcels owned by Edison Parking, and be the centerpiece of 22-acre (8.9 ha) of the city's Downtown surrounded by Gateway Center, Newark Penn Station, Government Center and Prudential Center, a 19,000 seat arena which opened in 2007. The city had acquired the deed to the park land in conjunction with the construction of the arena, but the project had not been further developed.

In March 2016, Mayor Ras J. Baraka announced a request for proposal for the park design. An official ground breaking ceremony took place October 2, 2017, and official opening of the first phase of the park took place May 30, 2019. It includes a city square of 2.5 acres (1.0 ha).

== Mulberry Commons Pedestrian Bridge ==
Phase 2 of the park held a symbolic groundbreaking ceremony in 2023 as the Mulberry Commons Pedestrian Bridge, a footbridge of 0.5 miles (0.80 km) over McCarter Highway and the Northeast Corridor with direct access to the train platforms at Newark Penn Station. As of December 2025, actual construction has not commenced. Billed as the High Line of Newark, it will connect to Peter Francisco Park in the Ironbound, a neighborhood of the city known as "Little Portugal" and Little Brazil," which would be a link to Newark Riverfront Park.

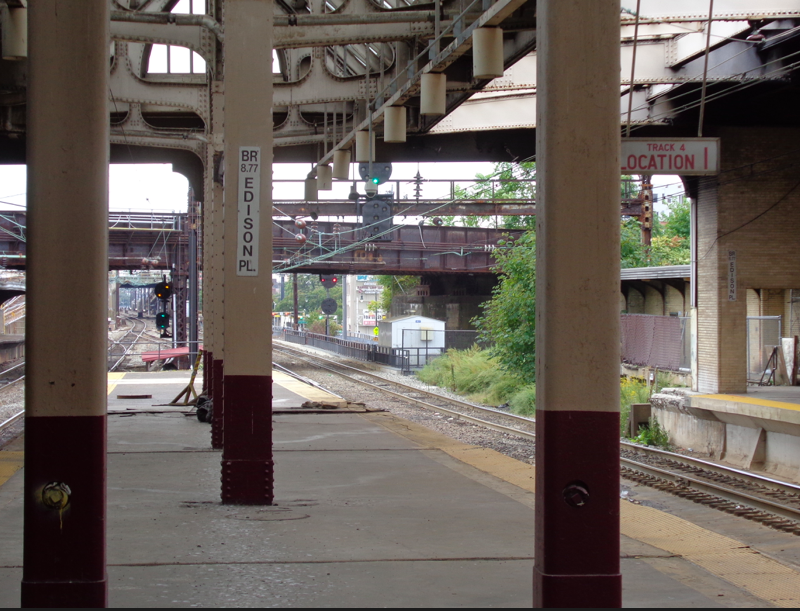
Former CNJ bridge over the NEC

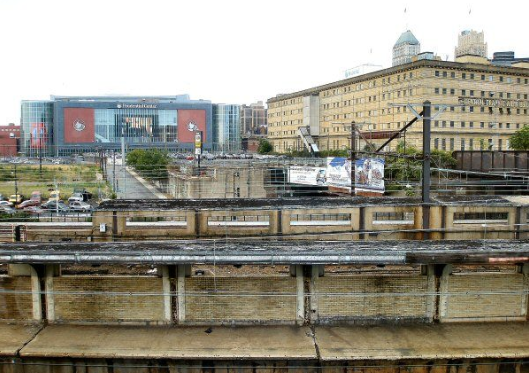
Overview of footbridge bridge site (2018)

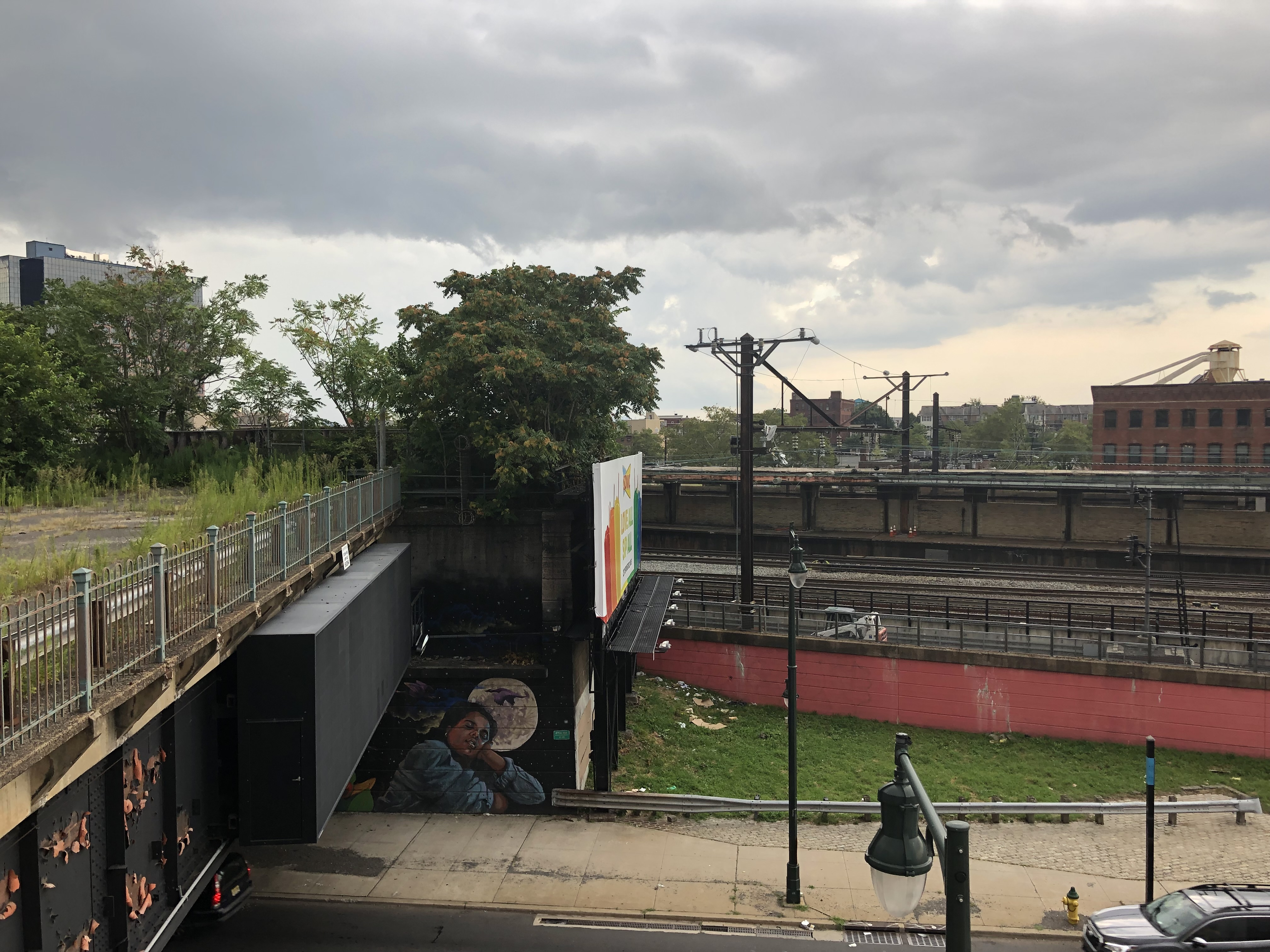
Footbridge and station entrance seen from the Commons

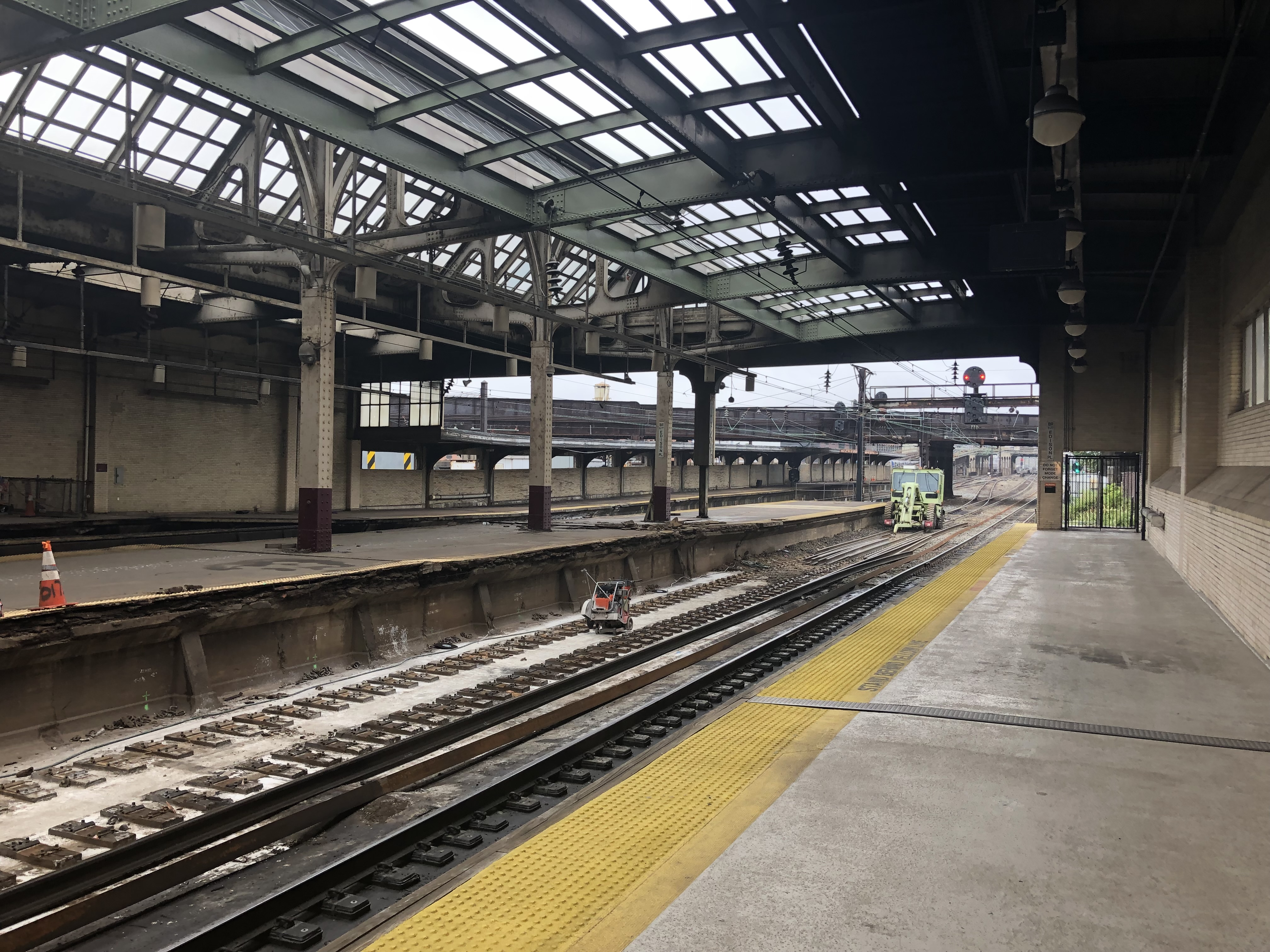
Bridge and station entrance site seen from Newark Penn

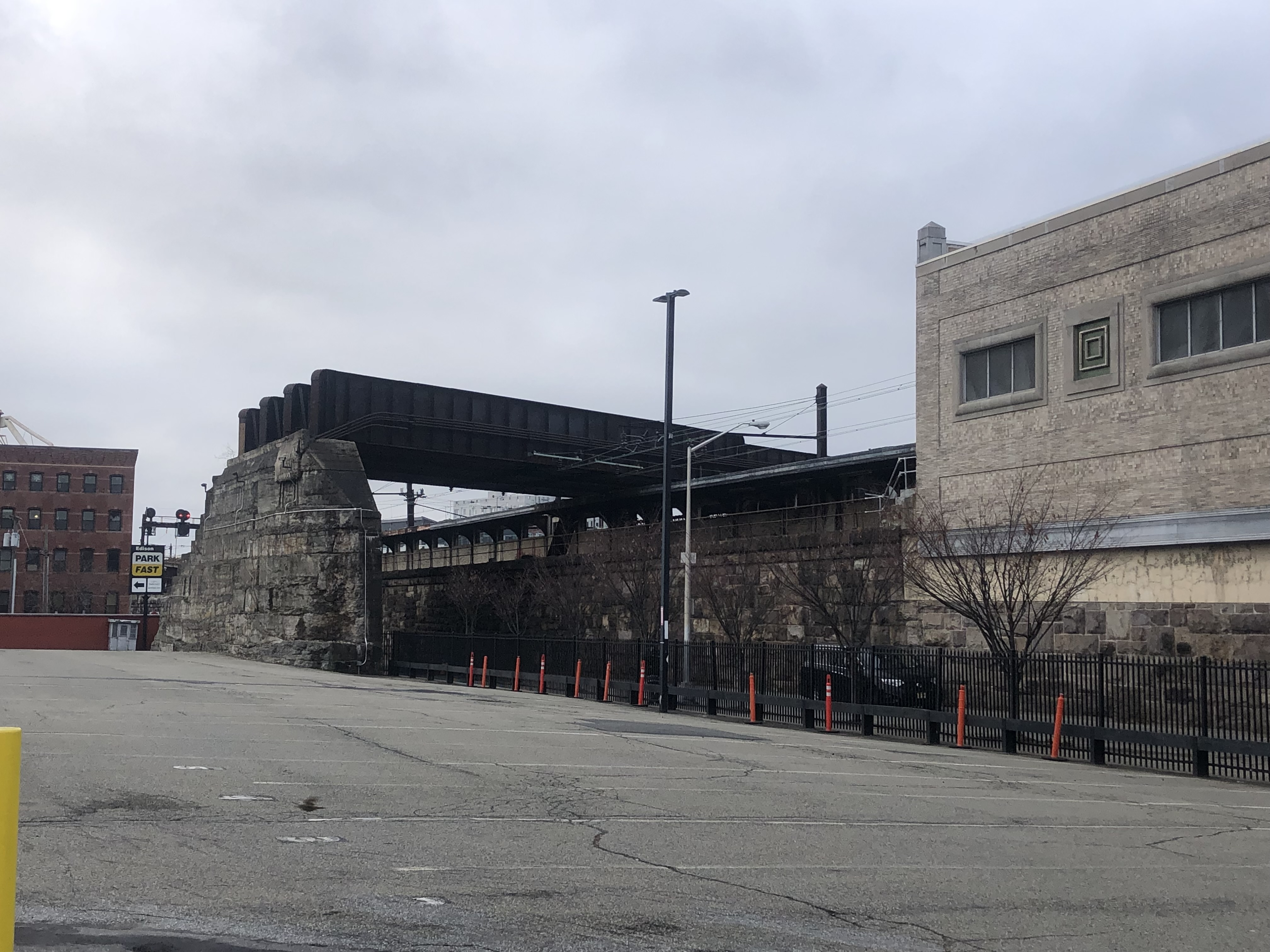
Bridge site as seen from Ironbound

== History of site and land acquisition ==
=== Chinatown ===
The park is near what was once the heart of Newark's Chinatown in the early 20th century. Only several hundred Chinese remain in the immediate area out of what were once thousands.

=== Central Railroad of New Jersey ===
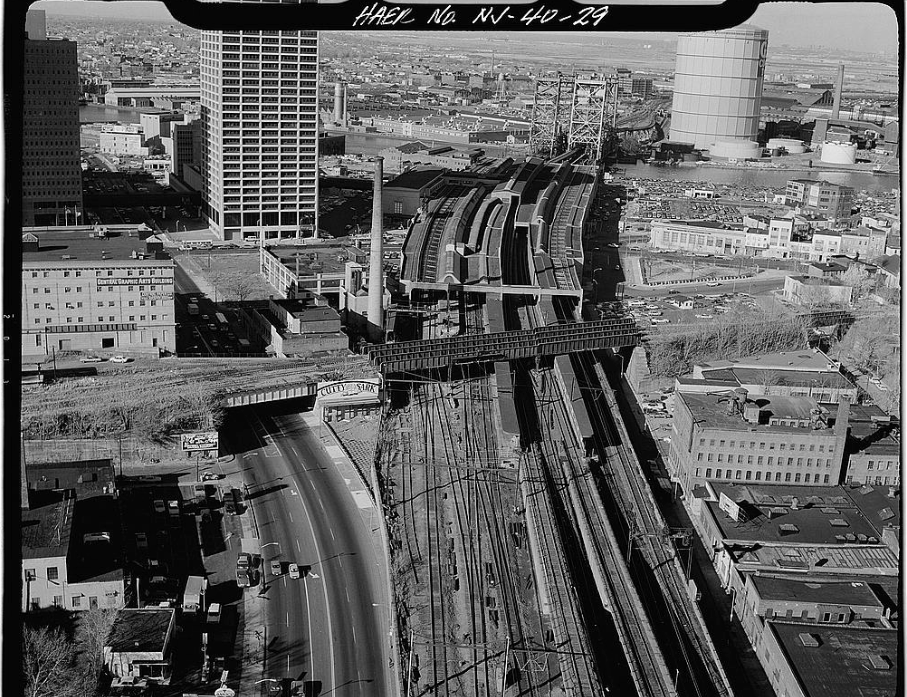
New Jersey Central tracks crossed over former Pennsylvania Railroad & now Amtrak NJ Transit Northeast Corridor tracks

The site was earlier the rail yard of the western terminus of the Central Railroad of New Jersey's Newark and New York Branch until service was discontinued and was used as a parking lot operated by Edison Park Fast operations, which owns numerous lots in the city.

=== Park proposals ===
The park was originally called Triangle Park. The site is a parcel of approximately 3 acres (1.2 ha) in the shape of a triangle. It is situated within the larger block bounded by Edison Place, Lafayette Street, McCarter Highway and Mulberry Street. The city acquired the land for the arena and park under the auspices of the Newark Downtown Core Redevelopment Corporation (NDCRC) for about $9.4 million in a series of complex purchase and transfer transactions with landowners Jose Lopez (a prominent local restaurateur) and Edison Properties, among others. The NDCRC was disbanded in April 2011 amid accusations of mismanagement. The land was transferred to the Newark Housing Authority in February 2015. The park was first proposed to act as a city square for new residential and commercial buildings in the district.

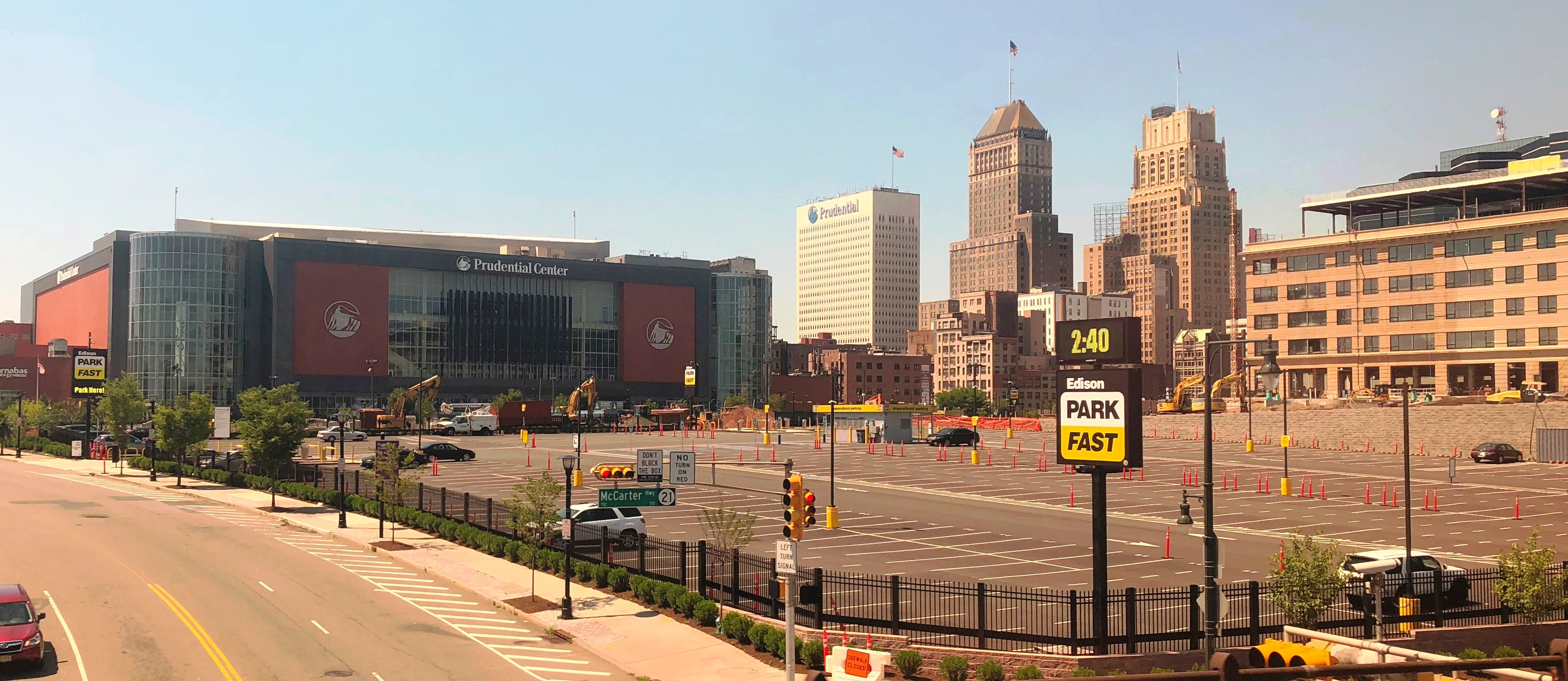
2018

Edison Properties, which owns development sites on the periphery of the park, had previous agreements with the city and proposed more a passive park with open space. It promoted the adaption of the former CNJ bridge to pedestrian walkway footbridge over McCarter Highway, the Northeast Corridor rail tracks south of Penn Station, and NJ Railroad Avenue to the city's Ironbound neighborhood, with a projected timeline of 2007 and an estimated cost between $40-$60 million.

In February 2015, the Municipal Council of Newark heard proposals for development of the park, which would change the original vision of the park and potential stakeholders. The city had opted to work with Boraie Development (developers of 50 Rector Park), which had a proposal that included retail and entertainment facilities. According to Mayor Ras J. Baraka, the development of a 125,000-square-foot passive park would cost the city about $200,000 to $300,000 a year to maintain. Baraka stated that it was "a very valuable piece of land" and should proceed with ratables.

In March 2016, the city announced a new plan to build a 2.5-acre public park and a footbridge of 0.5 miles (0.80 km) with a direct connection to the train platforms at Newark Penn Station ending at a park in the Ironbound named for Peter Francisco. Edison Properties as well as other stakeholders including the Prudential Center, the New Jersey Devils, and J&L Parking Corporation, have contributed funds and will oversee the development of the remaining acreage for commercial and residential uses.

== Redevelopment in the area ==
Ironside Newark, originally the Newark Warehouse Building, a 1907 Newark landmark also known as the Central Graphic Arts Building is located on the northeastern side of the park site backing Edison Place. The first commercial project was the transformation of the building into Ironside Newark, following a design by Perkins Eastman. M&M Mars-Wrigley signed a lease in 2017 for several floors in the building for office space, with employees be relocated here from their Chicago headquarters. Edison Properties also located its headquarters there. Two prominent law firms committed as well. McKinsey & Company consolidated its New Jersey workforce at the building.

The City of Newark Parking Authority constructed it headquarters and a five-story parking deck with 515 spaces with ground floor retail space, a cafe with outdoor seating and offices at the intersection of Mulberry and Green streets.

777 McCarter Highway, known as "Iconiq 777," is a 33 story, 400 ft (120 m) tall upscale residential building designed by Beyer Blinder Belle that was completed in 2022, making it the 5th tallest building in Newark.

== See also ==
- Grammy Museum Experience
- Military Park (Newark)
- Washington Park (Newark)
- Lincoln Park, Newark
- Grant USA Tower
- List of tallest buildings in Newark
