= Teachers Village, Newark =

Populated place in Essex County, New Jersey, US

Coordinates: 40.733641°N 74.175069°W

Teachers Village is a neighborhood centered around Halsey Street in Newark, New Jersey. It is located in Downtown Newark in southwest quadrant of the Four Corners Historic District, south of Market Street (SoMa) in the Central Ward between the Prudential Center and Springfield/Belmont.

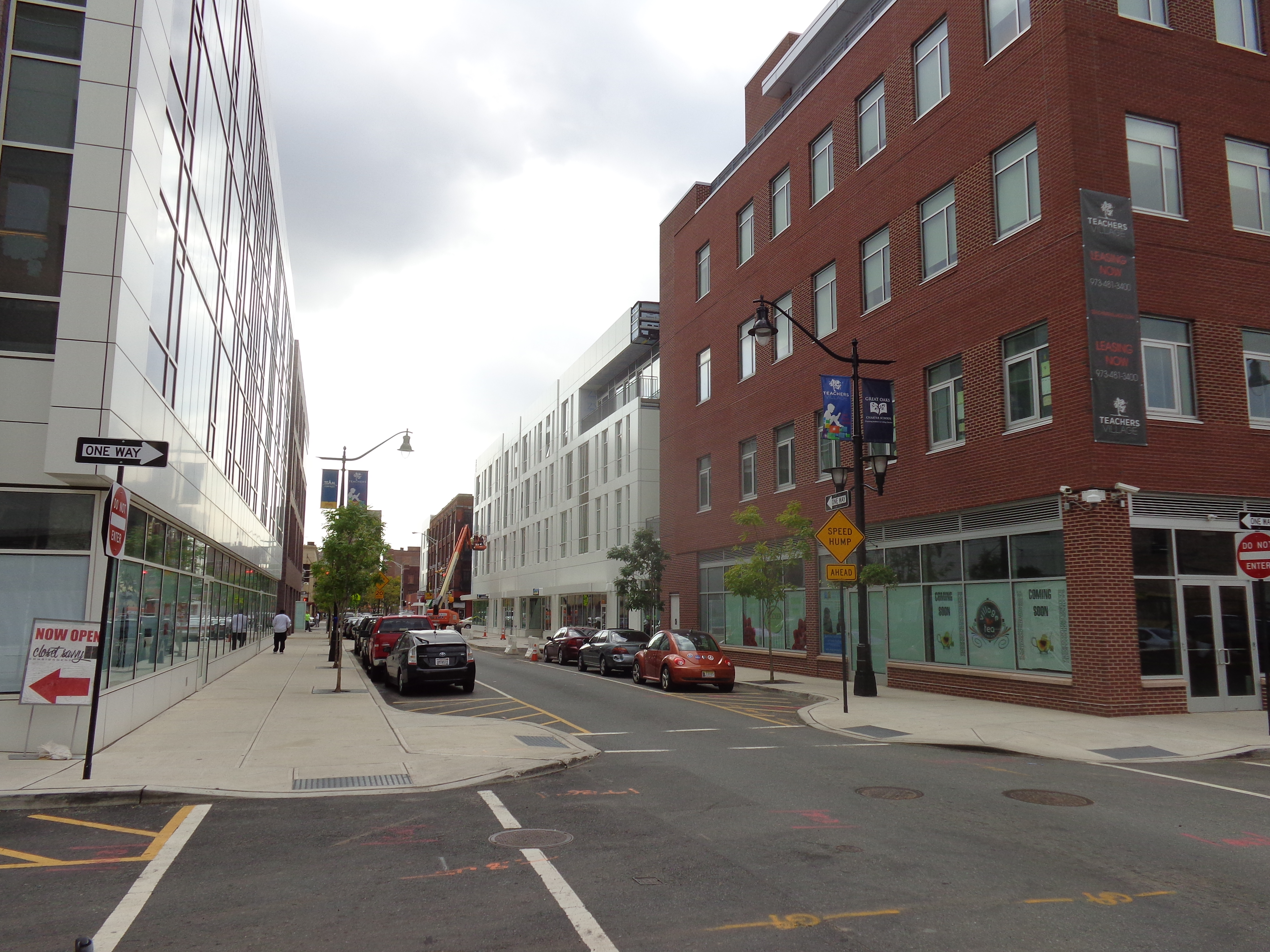
Halsey at Maiden Lane

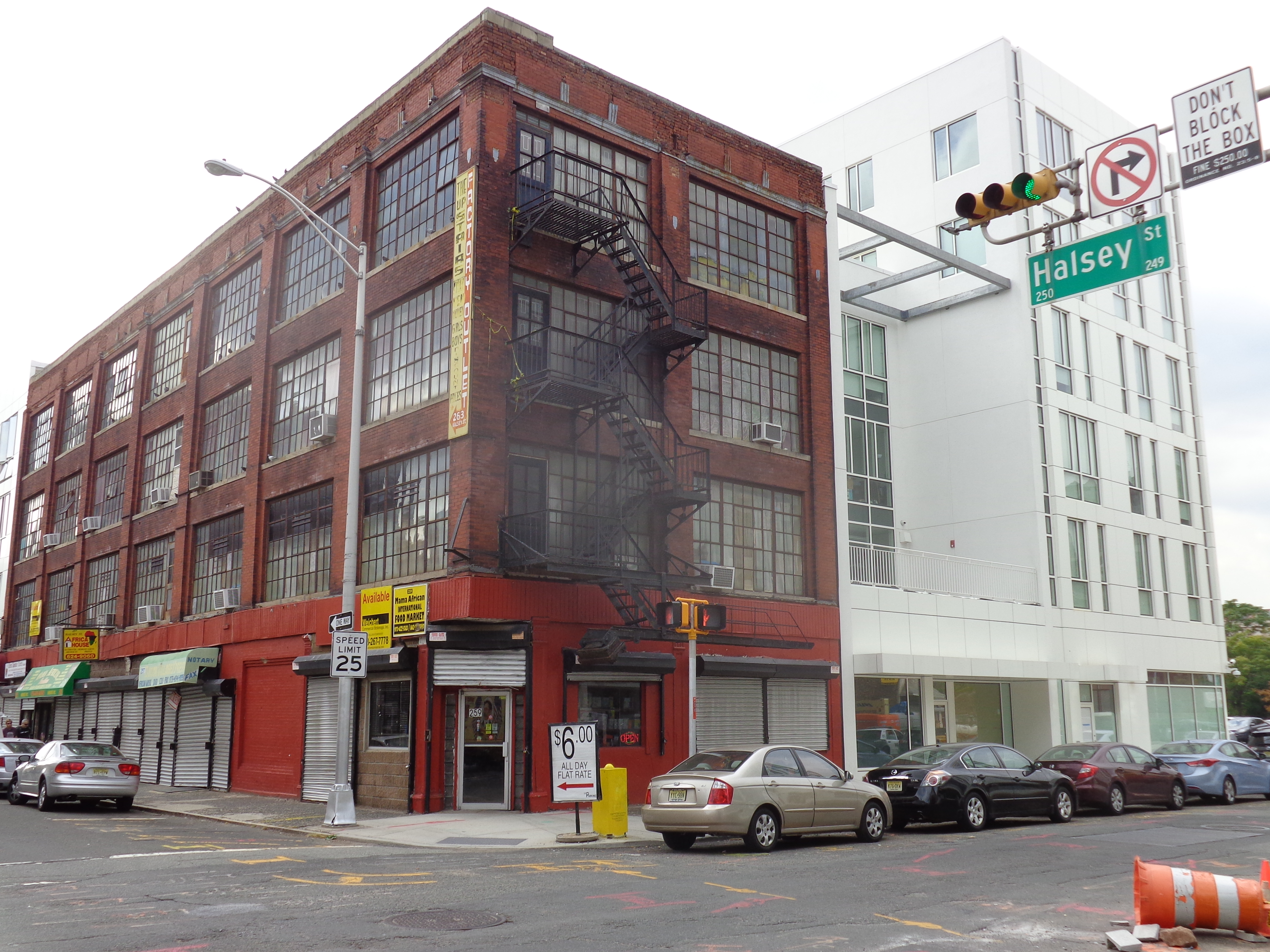
Old and new buildings at William Street

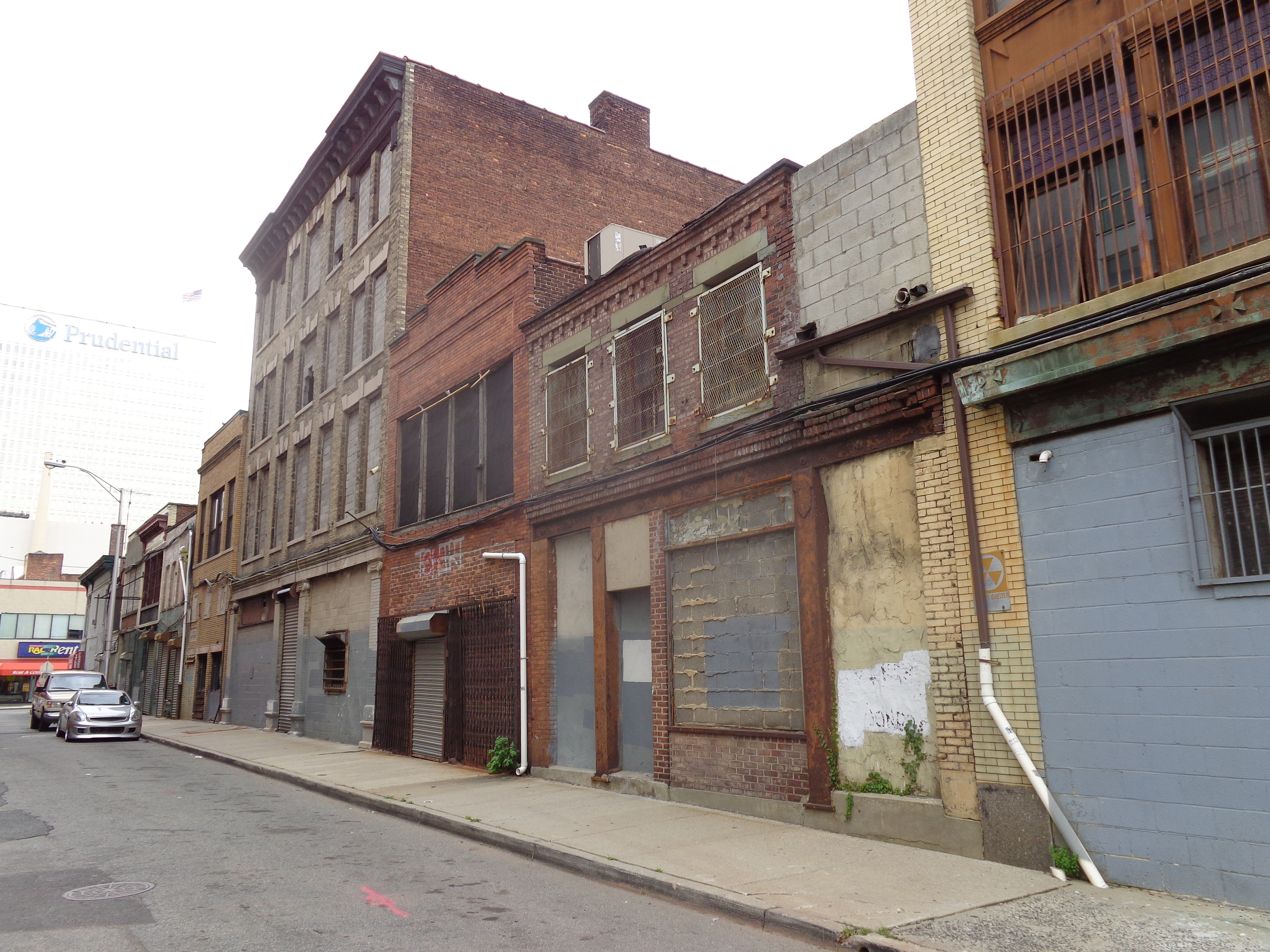
Treat Place

Teachers Village was originally developed by RBH and was designed by Newark native Richard Meier. The eight-building, 400,000-square-foot project transformed five blocks in the city, resulting in 204 moderately priced apartments, three charter schools, open space and 65,000 square feet of retail space.

Ground was broken in 2012. Some buildings though more than 100 years old, were considered expendable in the greater development planning. To that end the demolition and replacement of some lead to the creation of a retail corridor along Halsey Street. Goldman Sachs committed $100 million to the project. It was completed in 2018.

The project has stimulated other mixed-use development and renovations in the neighborhood such as the William Flats, and the Halo. At Washington and William Street a former office building is being heightened and transformed to residences. The Halo is a high-rise residence at the edge the neighborhood.

Teachers Village is the core of a broader redevelopment for the district called SoMa, short for south of Market Street. The master plan calls for more than 15 million square feet of development area across 23 acres in the neighborhood.
