= 550 Broad Street =

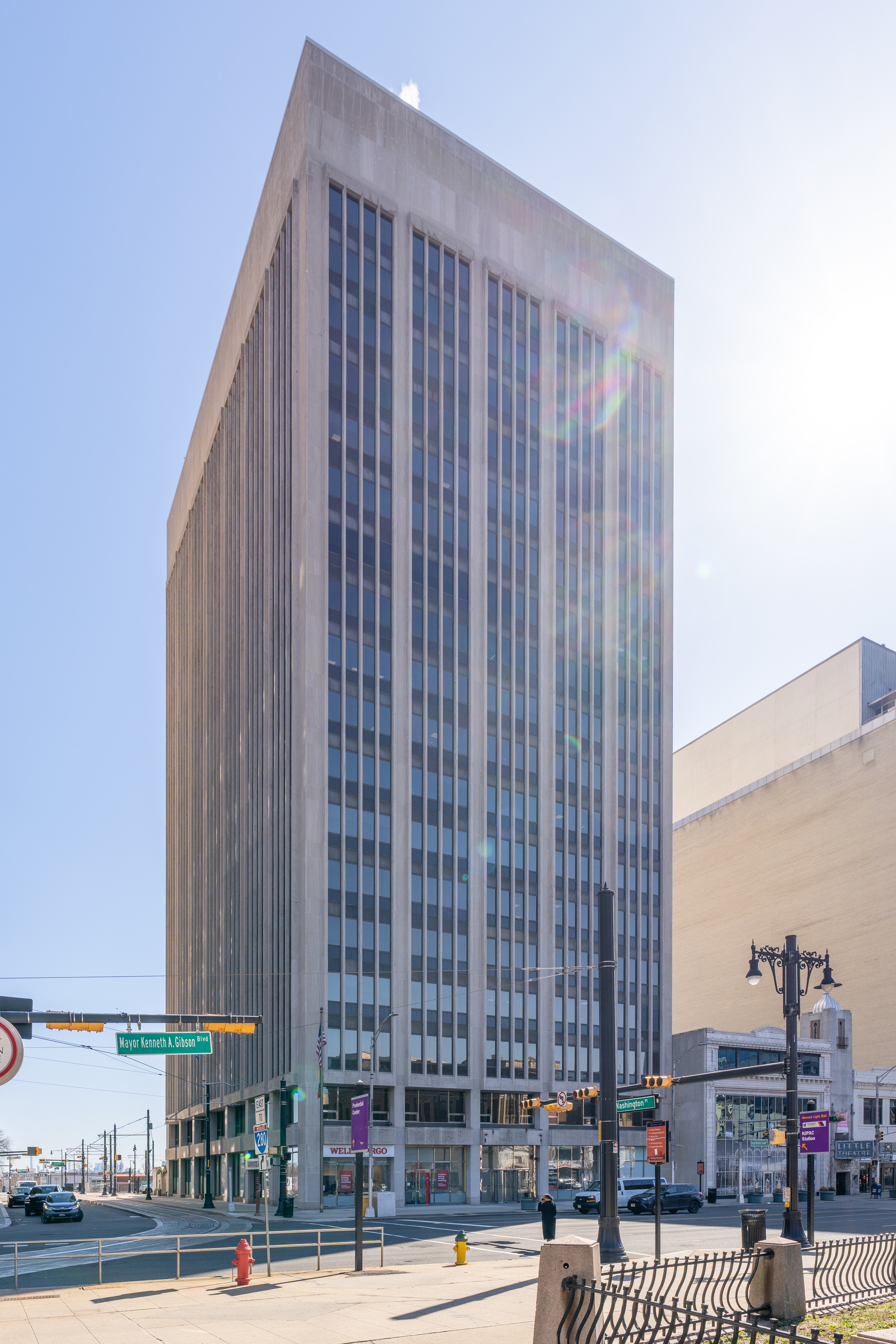
- Interactive map of the 550 Broad Street area

General information
- Type: Office
- Location: 550 Broad Street; Newark, New Jersey
- Coordinates: 40.741944°N 74.168889°W
- Completed: 1966
- Owner: Dr. Peter's Group; Heritage Capital Group
- Operator: Grubb and Ellis

Height
- Roof: 243 ft (74 m)

Technical details
- Floor count: 19
- Floor area: 312,003 sq ft (28,986.0 m^{2})

Design and construction
- Developer: Mutual Benefit Life Insurance Company; George A. Fuller Company

550 Broad Street is an office building in downtown Newark, New Jersey between the Newark Light Rail stations at Washington Park and Atlantic Street.

The Brutalist style building was built in 1966 during the New Newark era by the Mutual Benefit Life Insurance Company and the George A. Fuller Company and was once known as the Fidelity Union Building, after the company which occupied it. In 2000, the Heritage Capital Group purchased the tower and implemented a multimillion-dollar renovation-modernization in 2001, winning the state's Building of the Year award. While Heritage sold 80% interest in 550 Broad Street in 2005, it retains 20 percent ownership and acts as executive operating partner and on-site manager. The company also renovated nearby 570 Broad Street. As of 2012 the major tenant for the building is IDT, which is owner of the nearby Mutual Benefit Life Building.

In 2023, the Geraldine R. Dodge Foundation announced its decision to shift its headquarters from Morristown, New Jersey, to the building to better advance its philanthropic mission.

== See also ==
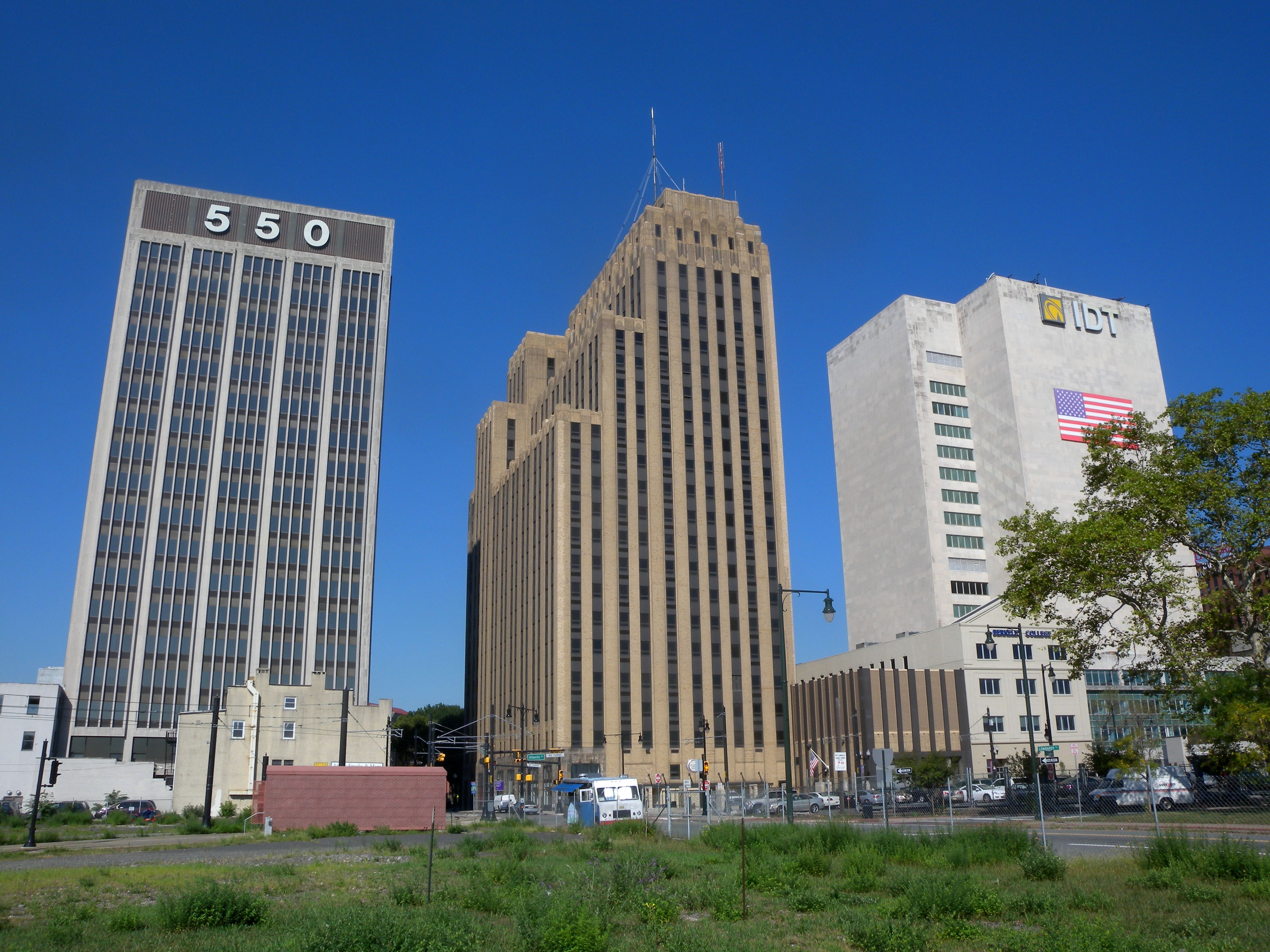
550 Broad, NJ Bell, Mutual Benefit looking west from Passaic River

- List of tallest buildings in Newark
- List of tallest buildings in New Jersey
