= The Halo (building complex) =

Skyscraper in Newark, New Jersey, US

Halo Tower 1
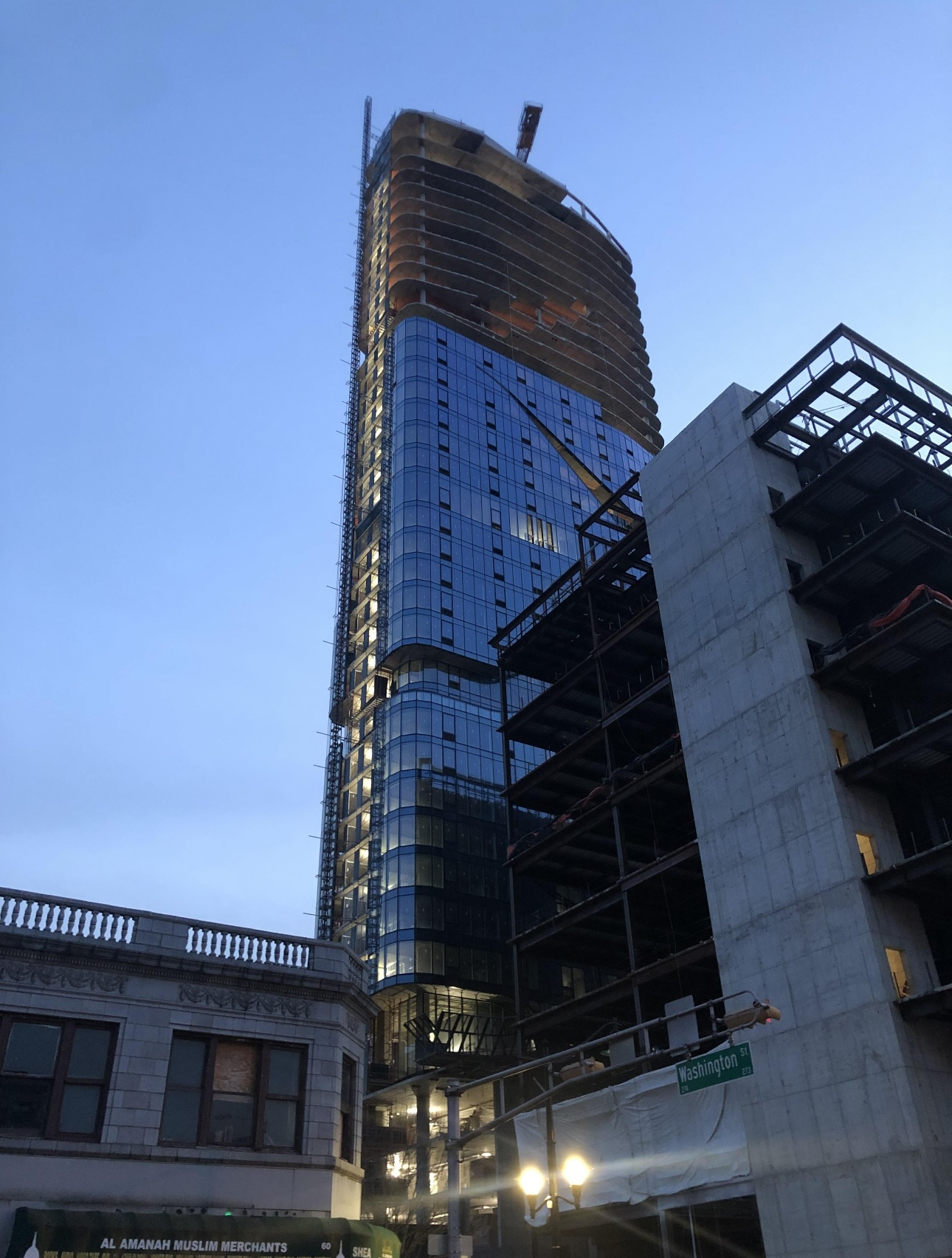
- Interactive map of the Halo Tower 1 area

General information
- Status: Topped off
- Type: Residential
- Location: 289 Washington Street, Newark, New Jersey
- Coordinates: 40.734995°N 74.176315°W
- Construction started: 2022
- Completed: 2024 (projected)
- Cost: $90 million

Height
- Roof: 454 ft (138 m)

Technical details
- Floor count: 42

Design and construction
- Architects: Murat Mutlu; INOA Architecture
- Developer: Acier Holdings
- Main contractor: Hudson Meridian

Website
- https://halonewark.com/

The Halo is a three-tower residential skyscraper complex under construction in Newark, New Jersey, which will include some of tallest buildings in the city. It is located on Washington Street west of Four Corners in Downtown Newark, situated between Teacher's Village and the Essex County Government Complex. The project was designed by INOA Architecture, which has also conceived other projects in Newark. The first of the three towers was topped off in 2024, becoming the 2nd tallest building in the city. In June 2024 construction stopped due to a financial dispute, but resumed in March 2025. In February 2026, further disagreements between developers and lenders arose.

== Background ==
The 0.621-acre (0.251 ha) site at 289-301 Washington Street was last used as a surface parking lot. It was purchased by the Acier Holdings in 2017 for between $10-$11 million. Plans for construction of the Halo were announced as early as 2018. The project, after having switched architects and undergone a series of concept and design changes, was approved by the city's planning board in March 2021. The city also approved a payment in lieu of taxes (PILOT) tax abatement for a period of thirty years in July 2023. The managing contractor is Hudson Meridian.

== Design ==
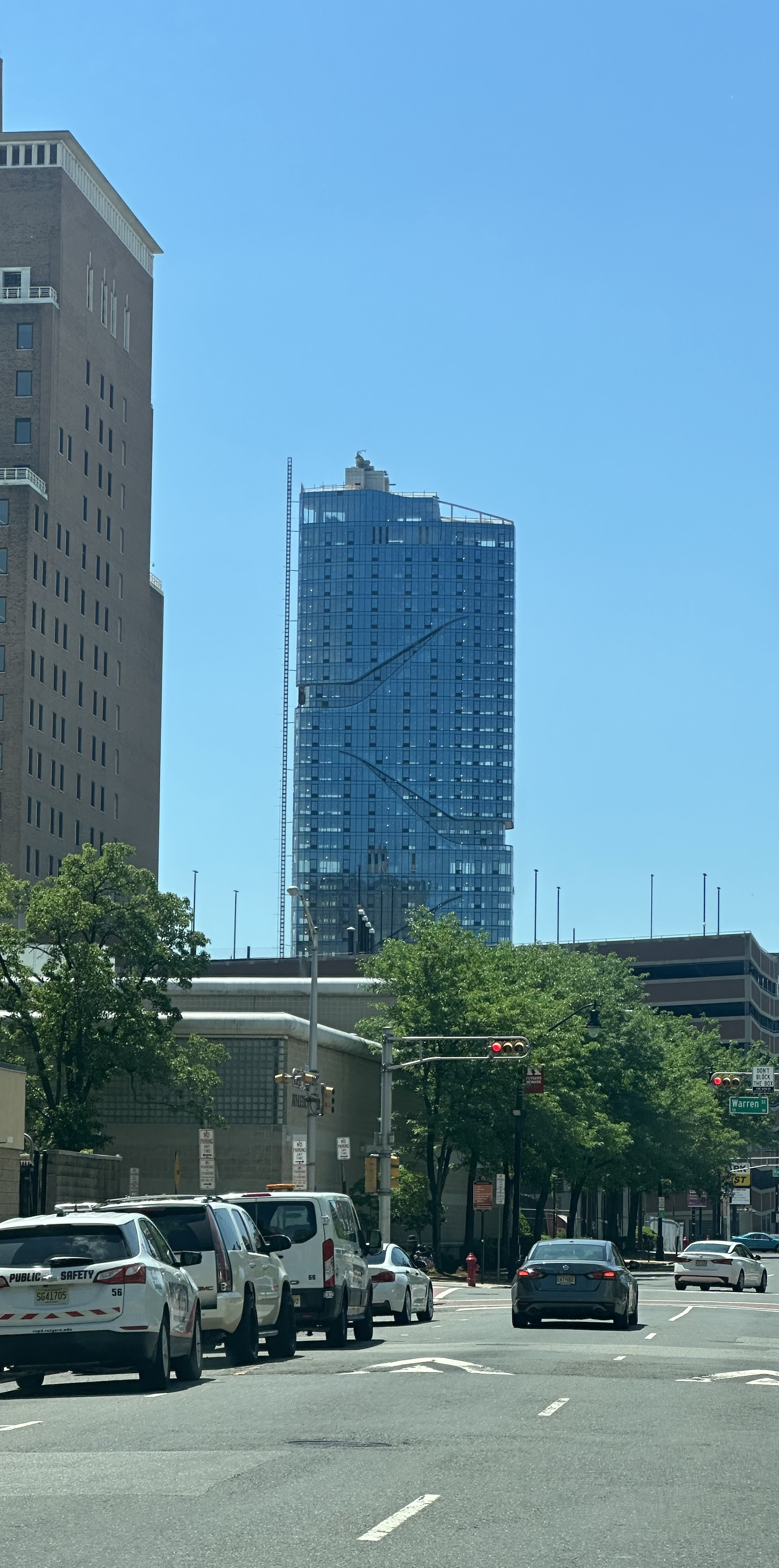
View from University Ave

The complex was designed by INOA Architecture, founded by Murat Mutlu in 2010. The towers will be built atop a six-level parking podium. Rising to various heights between 454 ft (138 m) and 619 ft (189 m), they will be topped with angled crowns with parapets sloping in opposite directions. Clad in reflective glass, the towers will have asymmetric bifurcated massing with a series of ornamental voids, or cutouts, in the exterior curtain wall, cascading to outdoor terraces. Each will have variety of amenities such as gyms, event spaces, libraries, "sky lounges", and eventually in one building, a rooftop swimming pool. The complex will have has approximately 950 apartments, 20% of which will be affordable as prescribed by the city’s inclusionary zoning ordinance.

INOA is the architect of record for other residential projects in Newark: 50 Sussex Avenue in University Heights; Newark Summit Tower, a 531 ft (162 m) 46-story high-rise within the Four Corners Historic District; and Arc Tower, a 45-story 520 ft (158 m) high-rise between Military Park and Harriet Tubman Square.

== Tower 1 ==
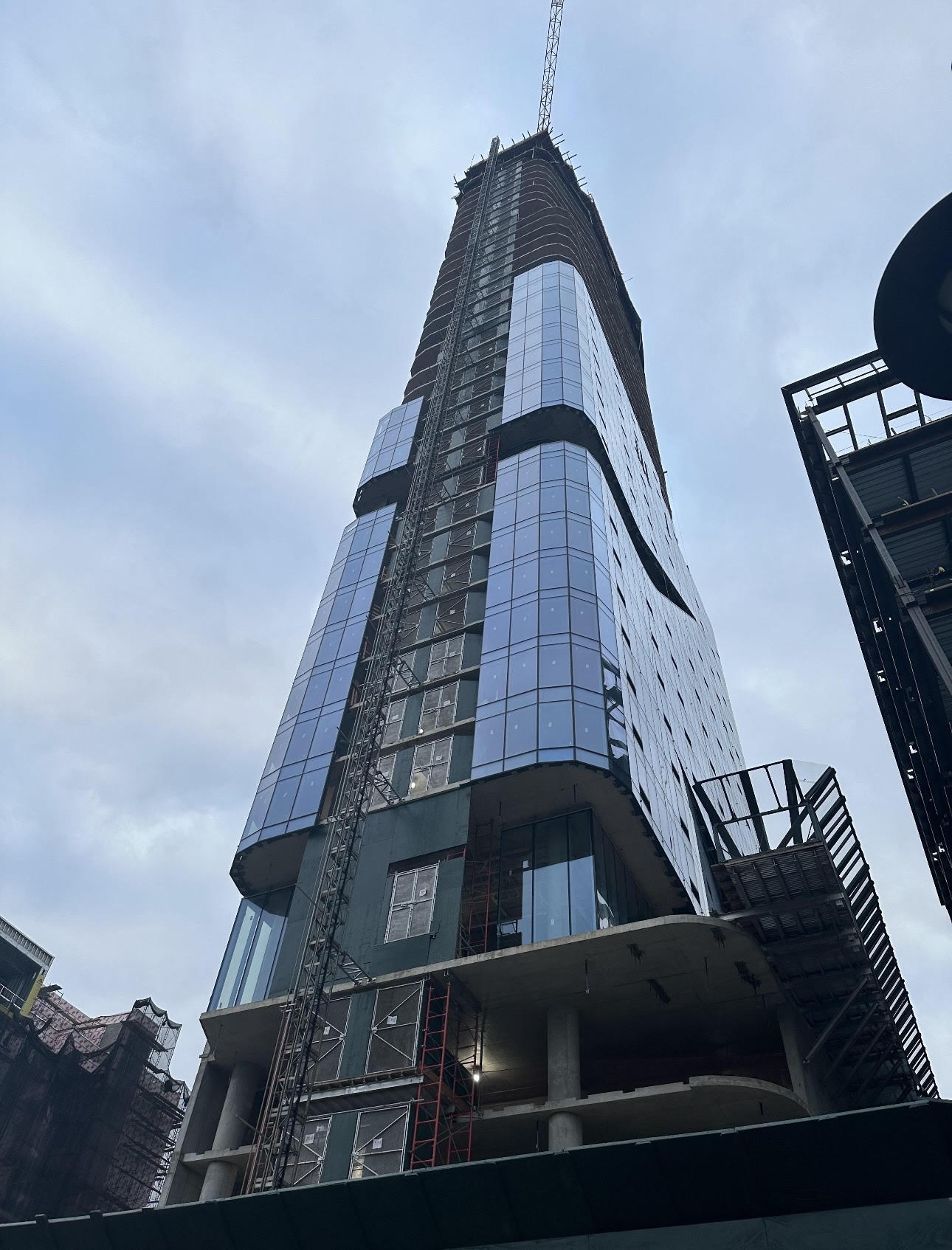
View from Washington Street

Acier Holdings, the project developer, announced the receipt a $90 million construction loan from Parkview Financial to build the first of the two phase project in January 2022.

Groundbreaking took place in Spring 2022. The building was topped off in February 2024. At forty-two stories, with a height of 454 ft (138 m), it is the second tallest building and tallest residential building in Newark. The tower would have 303 apartments.

In June 2024, construction temporarily stopped on the tower, but resumed in March 2025.

== Towers 2 and 3 ==
The second phase of the project will contain two other buildings built on the extended six-story podium: a tower of 58-stories at 619 ft (189 m) and a tower of 57-stories at 587 ft (179 m).

== See also ==
- List of tallest buildings in Newark
- List of tallest buildings in New Jersey
