= Hartz Mountains =

Hartz Mountain or Hartz Mountains can refer to one of:

- Hartz Mountains (Nunavut), a mountain range on Baffin Island, Nunavut, Canada
- Hartz Mountains (Tasmania), twin mountains in Tasmania, Australia
- Harz, a mountain range in northern Germany
- Hartz Mountain Industries, American real estate company
- Hartz Mountain Corporation, American pet food company
