= Grant USA Tower =

Proposed 121-story skyscraper planned for Newark, New Jersey

Coordinates: 40.732755°N 74.172242°W

- Interactive map of the Grant USA Tower area

General information
- Status: Never built
- Location: Newark, New Jersey, United States
- Construction started: Never

Height
- Architectural: 533.0 m (1,748.7 ft)

Technical details
- Floor count: 121

The Grant USA Tower was a proposed 121-story skyscraper planned for Newark, New Jersey by developer Harry Grant. Harry Grant was an Iraqi-born developer who was based out of New Jersey who financed the gold dome on top of Newark City Hall The tower was to be located over the Central Railroad of New Jersey's old Broad Street station, near Broad and Lafayette Street. In 2007, the incomplete Renaissance Mall was torn down to build the Prudential Center. The old and unused part of the train station below, which was to serve as the foundation of the tower, remains in place. There are currently plans to connect the old portion of the train station with the Prudential Center, with the idea of turning it into a museum.

Had it been completed as planned by 1986, it would have contained the tallest hotel, and would have been the tallest building and the tallest structure at the time.

== Description ==
The proposed 1,750-foot (530 m), 121-story tower was to be clad in "dollar green" glass, topped by a golden American bald eagle statue atop a flagpole, and large gold letters spelling out "USA" at the peak. The tower was to contain over 3,000,000 square feet (280,000 m^{2}) of office space, a hotel, convention facilities, and a promenade with an ice skating rink. There were plans for a 21-floor atrium above the 121st floor, which would have been the top floor of the hotel component. Grant also proposed a privately financed, 125-seat monorail system that would have run from the tower to the Newark Liberty International Airport.

The tower was to be built on the block bounded by Broad, Lafayette, Edison, and Mulberry Street, purchased by Grant for $1.2 million in a city auction in 1985. Construction on the first component of the project, the five-story, 250,000-square-foot (23,000 m^{2}) Renaissance Mall, was underway in 1989. The mall was to feature an international food court, a floating piano bar, office space, and horse and buggy rides around downtown Newark. An accompanying 30-story tower called "Grant USA I", was to be connected to the mall via skyway.

== See also ==
- List of tallest buildings in Newark
