= Prudential Center =

Multipurpose arena in Newark, New Jersey

- The Rock

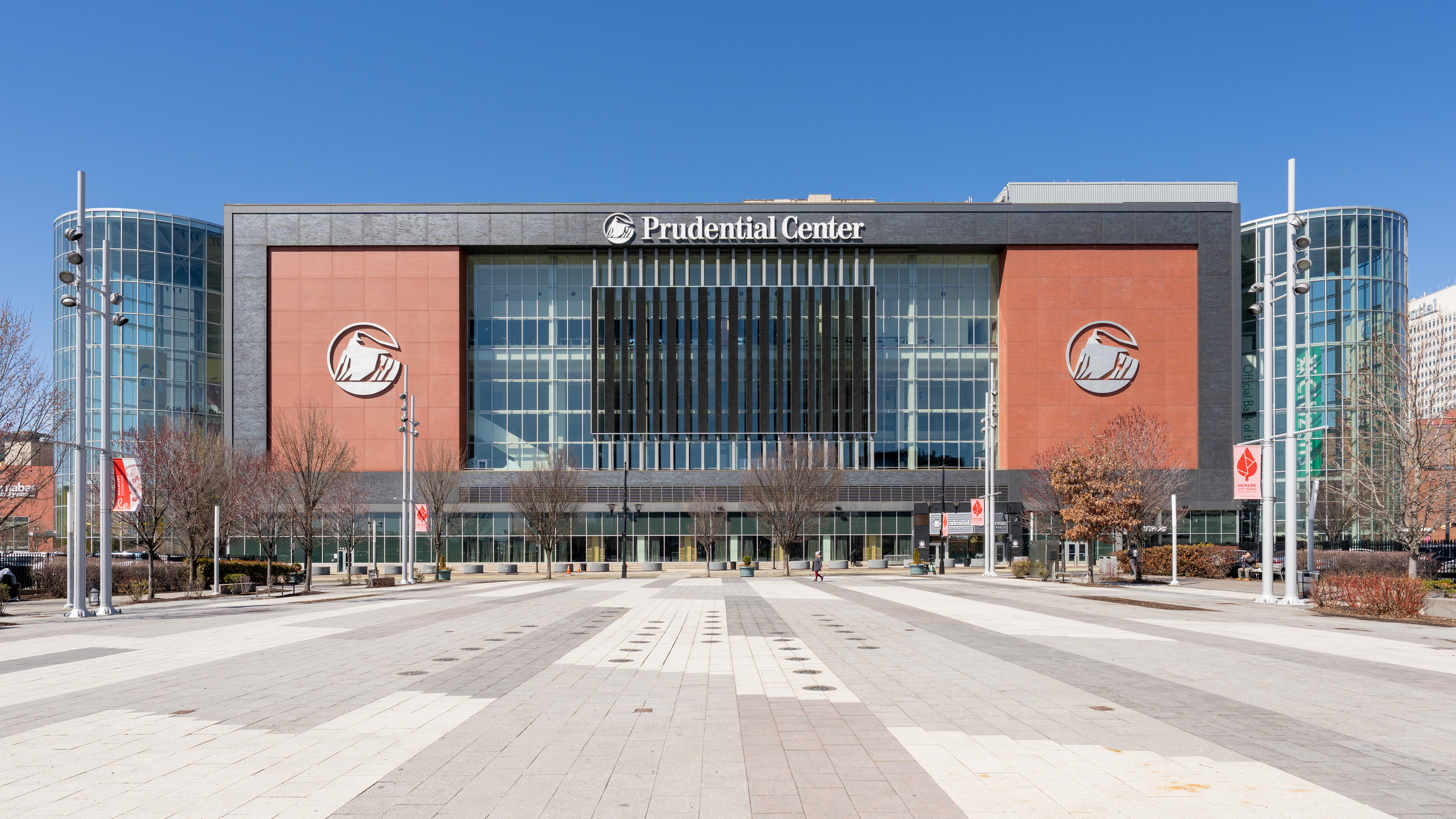
- Prudential Center in 2026

- Location of Prudential Center near New York City Location in New Jersey Location in the United States
- Address: 25 Lafayette Street
- Location: Newark, New Jersey, U.S.
- Coordinates: 40°44′1″N 74°10′16″W
- Owner: Newark Housing Authority
- Operator: Harris Blitzer Sports & Entertainment (HBSE)
- Capacity: Ice hockey: 17,625 (2007–2013); 16,592 (2013–2015); 16,514 (2015–present); Basketball: 18,711; Indoor soccer: 17,502; Lacrosse: 17,625; Concerts: 17,000
- Public transit: Newark Penn Station: Amtrak; NJ Transit Northeast Corridor Line North Jersey Coast Line Raritan Valley Line; Newark Light Rail Grove Street – Newark Penn Broad Street – Newark Penn PATH NWK–WTC; NJT Bus: 1, 5, 11, 21, 25, 28, 29, 30, 31, 34, 39, 40, 41, 44, 59, 62, 67, 70, 71, 72, 73, 76, 78, 79, 108, 308, 319, 361, 375, 378
- Parking: Approximately 3,500 parking spaces within two blocks, among other public parking facilities in the vicinity.

Construction
- Groundbreaking: October 3, 2005
- Opened: October 25, 2007
- Cost: US$375 million
- Architects: HOK Sport; Morris Adjmi Architects (Exterior); El Taller Colaborativo
- Project manager: ICON Venue Group
- Structural engineer: Thornton Tomasetti
- Services engineers: R.G. Vanderweil Engineers, Inc.
- General contractor: Gilbane Construction

Tenants
- New Jersey Devils (NHL) (2007–present); New Jersey Ironmen (MISL/XSL) (2007–2009); Seton Hall Pirates (NCAA) (2007–present); NJIT Highlanders (NCAA) (2007–present); New York Titans (NLL) (2009); New Jersey Nets (NBA) (2010–2012); New York Liberty (WNBA) (2011–2013); New York Sirens (PWHL) (2024–present)

Website
- prucenter.com

Prudential Center is a multipurpose indoor arena in Newark, New Jersey, United States. Opened in 2007, it is the home of the New Jersey Devils of the National Hockey League (NHL), the New York Sirens of the Professional Women's Hockey League (PWHL), and the men's basketball program of Seton Hall University. By 2023, it was among the top five concert venues worldwide by earnings. The arena is owned by the Newark Housing Authority and operated by Harris Blitzer Sports & Entertainment (HBSE), owners of the Devils.

== Background ==
Fans and sports writers have nicknamed the arena "The Rock" in reference to the Rock of Gibraltar, the corporate logo of Prudential Financial, a financial institution that owns the naming rights to the arena and is headquartered within walking distance of it. In December 2013, the arena ranked third nationally and ninth internationally for self-reported annual revenue.

At the time of its opening, Prudential Center was the first major league sports venue to be built in the New York metropolitan area since Meadowlands Arena, the Devils' former home, opened in 1981. The arena was designed by Populous and Morris Adjmi Architects. It is owned by the Newark Housing Authority and operated by Josh Harris and David Blitzer of Harris Blitzer Sports & Entertainment (HBSE).

== Arena usage ==
=== Professional hockey ===
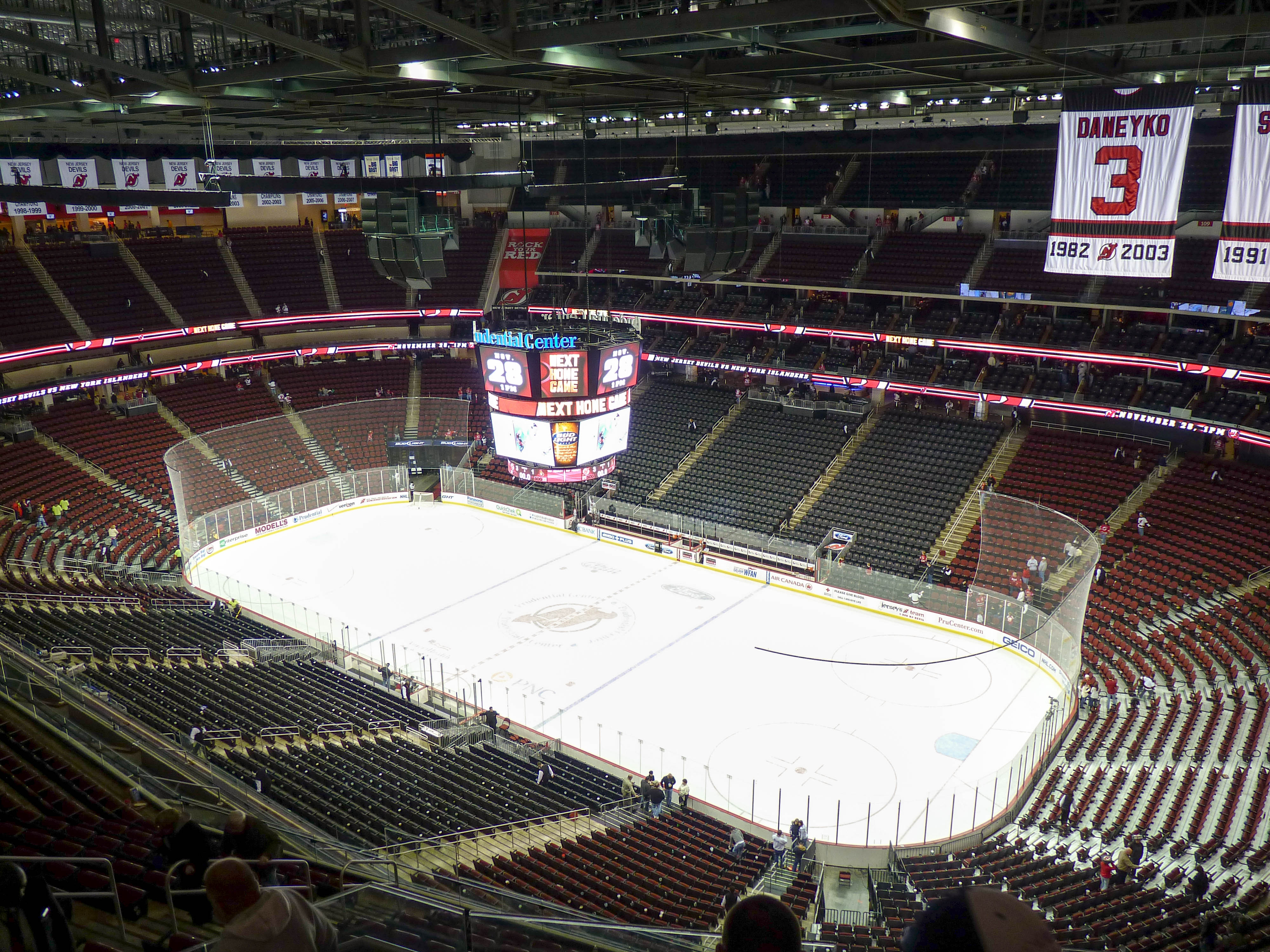
a view of the ice from Section 232 following a New Jersey Devils game on December 10, 2009

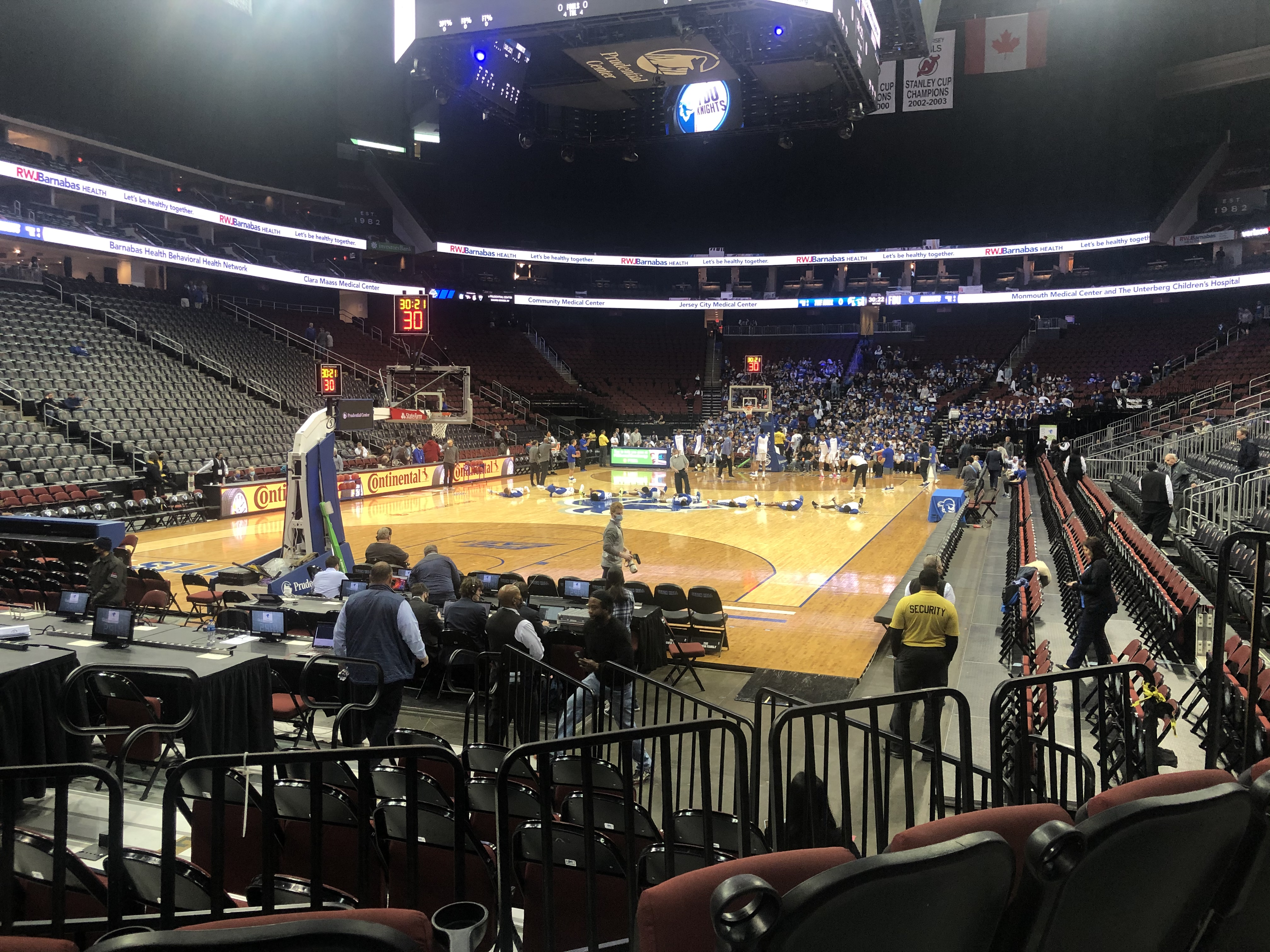
The Seton Hall Pirates warming up at the Prudential Center in November 2021

The Prudential Center primarily serves as the home arena for the New Jersey Devils, a National Hockey League franchise. The team previously played at Meadowlands Arena from 1982 to 2007. The arena also became the home arena for the New York Sirens of the Professional Women's Hockey League starting with the 2024–2025 season.

The Devils' first playoff series-clinching win at the arena was on May 25, 2012, when they defeated the rival New York Rangers 3–2 in overtime on a goal by Adam Henrique to advance to the Stanley Cup Final. Games one, two, and five of the 2012 Stanley Cup Final were played at the arena.

=== Basketball ===
The Prudential Center is the home court of the NCAA's Seton Hall Pirates men's basketball team, which played in the Meadowlands from 1985 to 2007. The arena also hosts select home games for the Seton Hall Pirates women's basketball team, and the NJIT Highlanders men's basketball team.

The Prudential Center was originally intended to also be the home of the New Jersey Nets, but the team was sold to real estate developer Bruce Ratner, who intended to build an arena in Brooklyn for the team, and the Nets remained in the Meadowlands while awaiting construction of what became the Barclays Center. However, the construction of the Barclays Center was plagued by lawsuits and economic issues during the late 2000s recession. In the fall of 2009, the Nets played two preseason games at the Prudential Center, while considering a possible move there. After the success of the preseason games at the Prudential Center, the Nets finalized a deal to move to the Prudential Center.

On April 23, 2012, the Nets played their final game at the Prudential Center. The Nets relocated to the Barclays Center to become the Brooklyn Nets at the beginning of the 2012–13 NBA season.

The New York Liberty of the Women's National Basketball Association (WNBA) played home games at Prudential Center during the 2011, 2012 and 2013 seasons, due to renovations at Madison Square Garden.

=== Concerts and live productions ===
The venue has hosted the MTV Video Music Awards a number of times in recent years. It has additionally hosted concerts for acts such as Celine Dion, Taylor Swift, Bad Bunny, Billie Eilish, Marc Anthony, My Chemical Romance, Rihanna, Katy Perry, Elton John, Justin Bieber, Dua Lipa, The Weeknd, Daddy Yankee, and Tool. In 2017, Billboard named Prudential Center "the East Coast home of K-pop" as the venue has hosted numerous K-pop concerts for acts such as BTS, Suga, NCT, Blackpink, Stray Kids, Jin IU, and LE SSERAFIM, as well as KCON conventions.

Sources give maximum capacity for concerts as 19,500, although the venue's website itself currently lists capacity as the following: Center Stage: 16,755; End Stage: 16,659; Half House Theater: 7,777; Lower Bowl Half House: 4,094; Cocktail Reception: 2,500; Banquet: 1,000; and Theatre Style: 2,000.

=== Mixed martial arts ===
The arena has held a series of UFC events. The first was held on November 17, 2007, when the arena hosted the UFC's hundredth event for UFC 78: Validation. On March 27, 2010, the arena held UFC 111: St-Pierre vs. Hardy. On March 19, 2011, the arena held UFC 128: Shogun vs. Jones. On April 27, 2013, the arena held UFC 159: Jones vs. Sonnen. On February 1, 2014, the arena held UFC 169: Barão vs. Faber 2. On April 18, 2015, the arena held UFC on Fox: Machida vs. Rockhold. On January 30, 2016, the arena held UFC on Fox: Johnson vs. Bader. On August 3, 2019, the arena held UFC on ESPN: Covington vs. Lawler. On May 6, 2023, the arena held UFC 288: Sterling vs. Cejudo. On June 1, 2024, the arena held UFC 302: Makhachev vs. Poirier. On June 7, 2025, the arena held UFC 316: Dvalishvili vs. O'Malley 2. On May 9, 2026, the arena held UFC 328: Chimaev vs. Strickland.

=== Tennis ===
On December 7, the arena will host 'A Racquet at The Rock', its first tennis event. The competitors will include Carlos Alcaraz, Amanda Anisimova, Frances Tiafoe, and Emma Raducanu.

=== Professional wrestling ===
All Elite Wrestling (AEW) made its venue debut on September 15, 2021, hosting a live episode of AEW Dynamite. On January 5, 2022, the arena hosted the flagship premiere of Dynamite on TBS. The Prudential Center has also hosted the Full Gear pay-per-view event across three separate years in 2022, 2024 and 2025. Additionally, the arena hosted a live broadcast of AEW Collision on July 22, 2023.

=== Wrestling ===
The venue has hosted the annual Final X event for USA Wrestling since 2023, with Final X 2026 scheduled for June 19, 2026.

== Features ==
=== Design ===
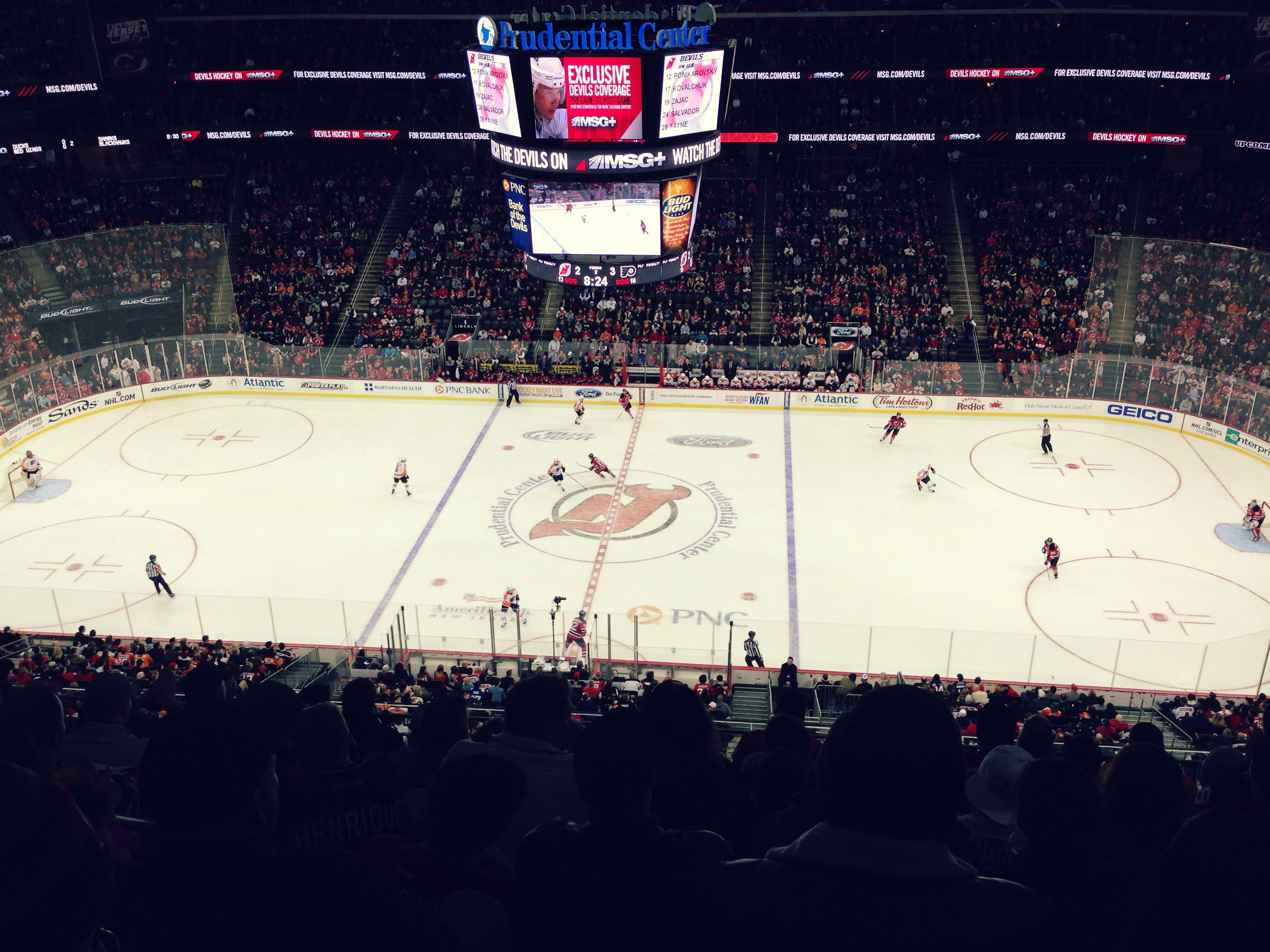
The interior of the Prudential Center in Newark, New Jersey during a New Jersey Devils game

The red and gray exterior is inspired by Newark's bricklaying and railroad heritage. Fans approaching the arena from the front are presented with a view of the arena's externally mounted 4,800 square foot (446 m^{2}) LED display, one of the largest in the world. The Daktronics display is split up into thin panels with gaps in between, in order to prevent the fans' view from inside from being obstructed. Along the arena's east side Mulberry Street entrance are two large cylindrical entrance towers, the arena's most prominent exterior feature. These towers take the fans up to the main concourse, by escalator and staircase.

The interior's lower level concourse provides views of downtown Newark on the Edison Place and Mulberry Street sides through large windows. Prudential Center features separate concourses for the lower and upper levels, whereas the Continental Airlines Arena had one concourse for both levels of the arena. Throughout the lower concourse, jerseys of most high school hockey teams in New Jersey hang from the walls. The arena also features many murals of players and memorable moments from Devils history. One 6,000-square-foot (560 m^{2}) mural encompasses a long stretch of the lower concourse wall and features Devils Martin Brodeur, Scott Stevens, and Ken Daneyko, along with tributes to other New Jersey sports and Newark landmarks, with depictions that include Seton Hall men's basketball legends Richie Regan and Terry Dehere, soccer player Tony Meola, a boxer, and tennis legend Althea Gibson.

=== Amenities and facilities ===
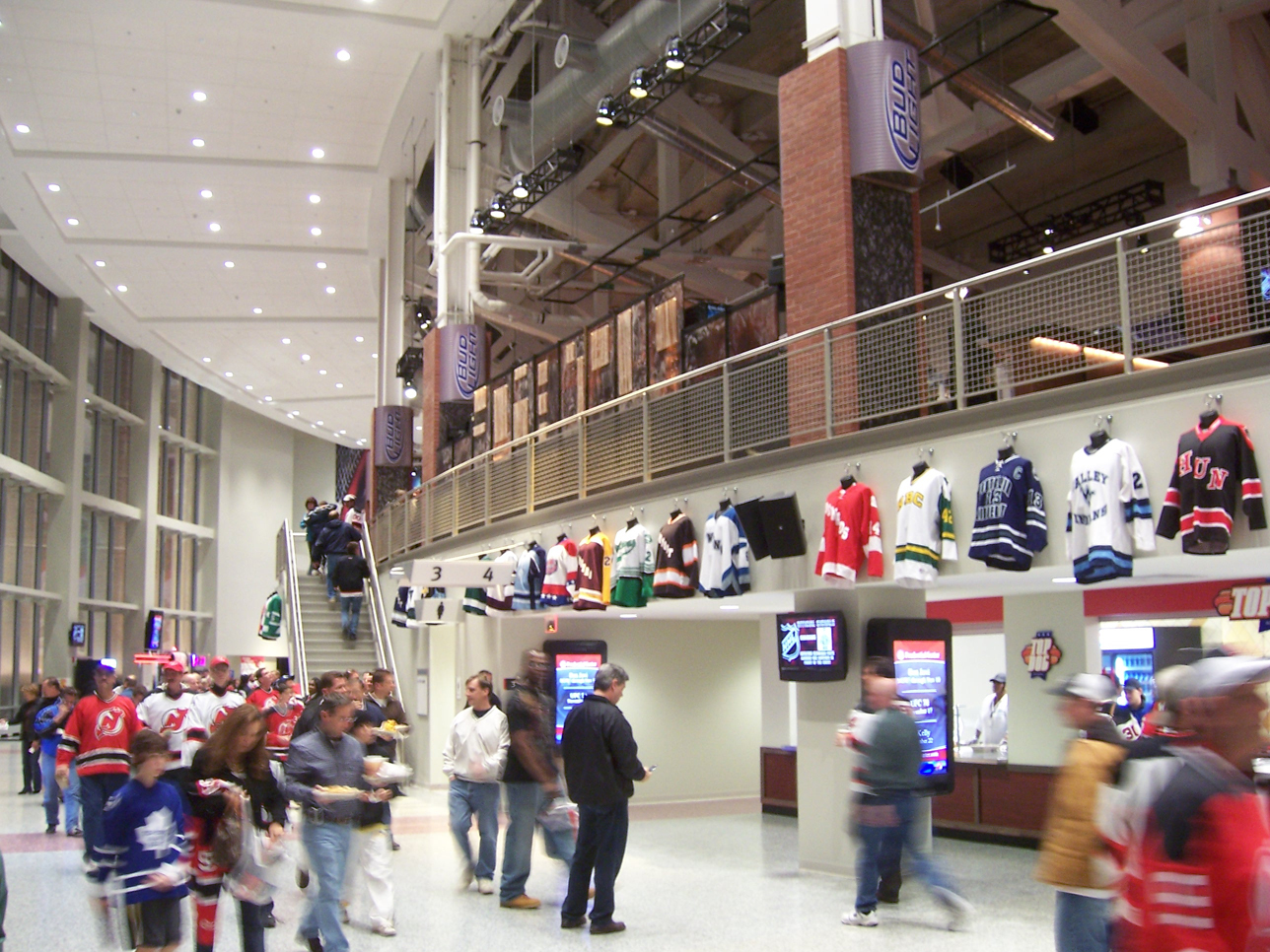
The lower level concourse with the Goal Bar on the upper right, featuring jerseys from most high school hockey teams in New Jersey

The new scoreboard installed before the first New Jersey Devils regular season game in 2017

As one of the newer facilities to be used in the NHL, the Prudential Center features a large array of amenities. The rink area features LED ribbons circumnavigating the arena and a 9,585-square-foot (890.5 m^{2}) scoreboard by Trans-Lux installed in 2017, weighing over 44 tons and the largest in-arena, center-hung scoreboard in the world, replacing a smaller, lower-resolution eight-sided unit from Daktronics. The 76 luxury suites available are the largest in North America. Personal dining, WiFi, and HDTVs are some of the many conveniences available in the luxury suites. There are 750 flat-screen TVs in total across the arena. On each side of the lower bowl the three middle sections consist of a combined 2,330 Club seats. These black-colored seats emblazoned with the Devils' logo are wider with more legroom. Club seat and season ticket holders have access to a 350-seat restaurant on the suite level in one of the end zones with views of the rink and practice rink. Additionally, the Goal Bar, located on Suite Level One offers Club and Goal Bar seat holders terrace-style seating in a bar environment. Club Seat holders also have access to lounges on the main concourse offering buffet-style food options. One of these lounges contains the television camera staging area and the commentating post at which Don La Greca and Ken Daneyko call games for MSG Sportsnet telecasts, whereas home radio broadcasts and all road team broadcasts originate from the press box above the 200 level.

On the north, Edison Place side of the arena, at street level, are the ticket office and the Devils' 2,600 square foot (242 m^{2}) Team Store, along with Championship Plaza, a public meeting place that celebrates the Devils' past and present successes on the ice. Attached to the Prudential Center are the Devils' corporate offices and practice rink, which contains its own locker rooms. The Prudential Center is one of only five NHL arenas with a practice rink (the others are Nationwide Arena in Columbus, Ohio, home of the Columbus Blue Jackets; KeyBank Center in Buffalo, New York, home of the Buffalo Sabres; Little Caesars Arena in Detroit, Michigan, home of the Detroit Red Wings; and Rogers Place in Edmonton, Alberta, home of the Edmonton Oilers), and the only one with dual locker rooms and practice facilities.

The Grammy Museum Experience, a museum celebrating the Grammy Awards, was held at the center from October 20, 2017, to June 25, 2023.

=== Practice rink ===
The Devils' practice rink, the RWJ Barnabas Health Hockey House (formerly AmeriHealth Pavilion), is attached to the arena, located on the south side of the building. On select days, it is open to fans after the game for public ice skating. The practice rink also served as the home of the Metropolitan Riveters of the National Women's Hockey League from 2016 to 2019. The Saint Peter's Prep Mauraders hockey teams, NJIT Highlanders club hockey team that competes in the Colonial States College Hockey Conference, and other local youth teams also use the rink. The arena also hosts the NJSIAA Public A, Public B, and Private State Finals for high school ice hockey.

=== Championship Plaza and environs ===
Championship Plaza was opened on October 3, 2009. The public square celebrating the Devils' history is opposite the arena on Mulberry Street between Edison Place and Market Street. The most prominent piece of the plaza is the 22-foot (6.7 m) tall, 7,000-pound (3,200 kg) stainless steel hockey player statue. The Rock, part of Prudential's logo inspired by the Rock of Gibraltar, was also installed in the plaza. Devil fans were able to purchase a limited amount of bricks that would be placed in and around the plaza with personalized messages inscribed.

On the opposite end of the arena, a statue of former Devils goaltender Martin Brodeur was dedicated outside of the Lafayette Street entrance tower and practice rink on October 22, 2016.

Much like the New Jersey Performing Arts Center, the Prudential Center was expected to boost Newark's urban renaissance. Small-scale projects in the immediate vicinity of the arena around Four Corners have led to the construction of new hotels, loft conversions, and a restaurant row. The development of Mulberry Commons, a city square originally proposed as the centerpiece of a commercial and residential complex near the arena, stagnated for a decade. Construction began in October 2017, and park opened after 15 years of delay on May 30, 2019.

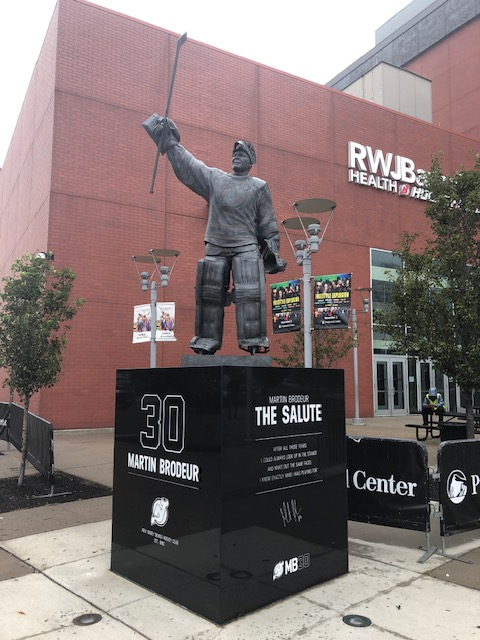
Martin Brodeur

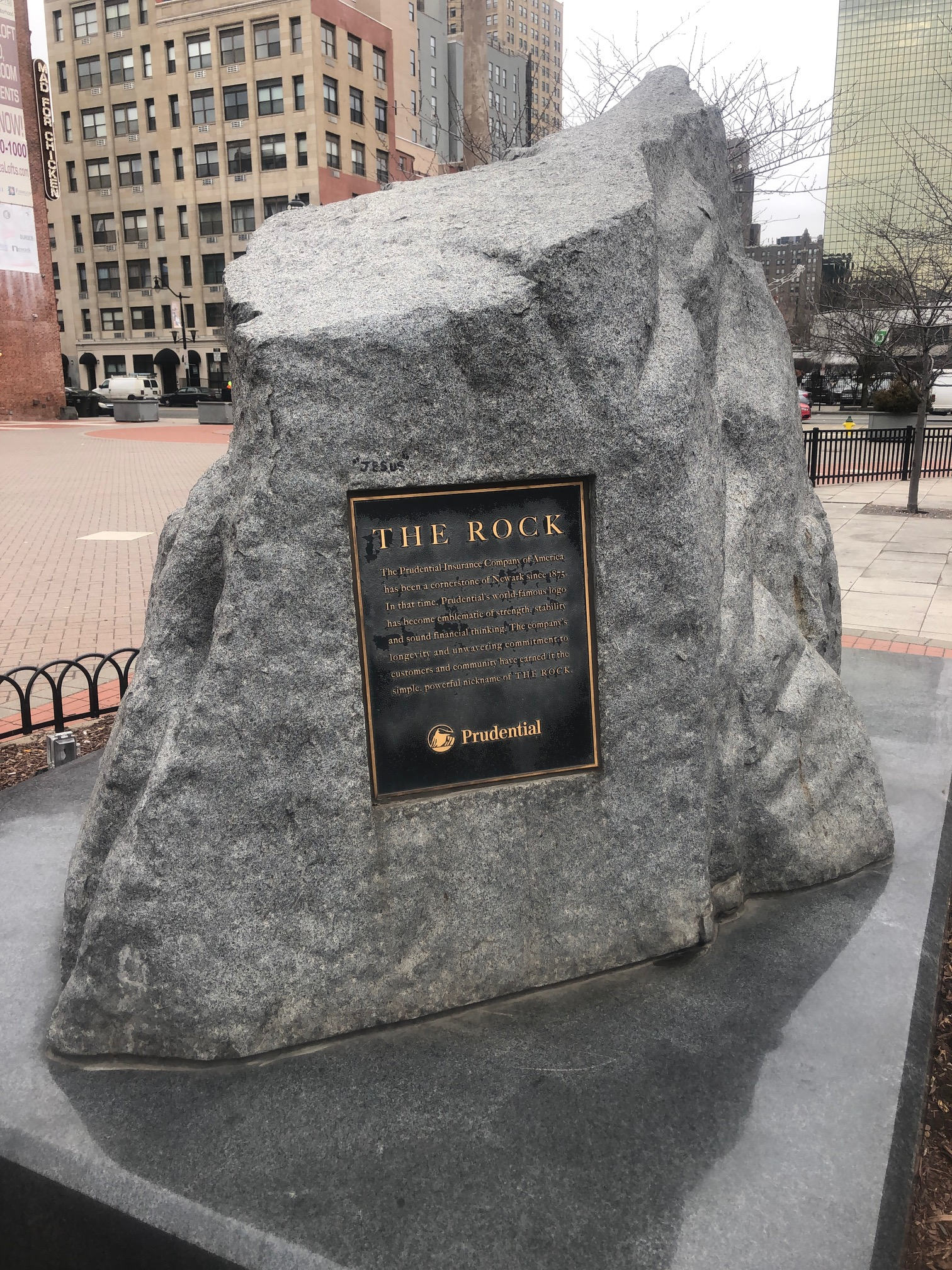
The Rock

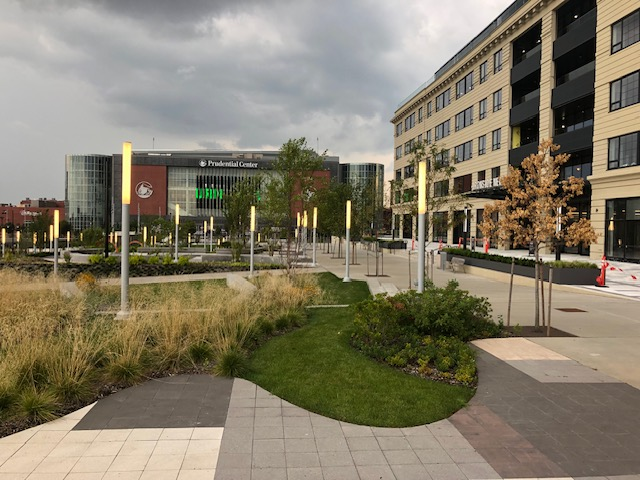
Mulberry Commons

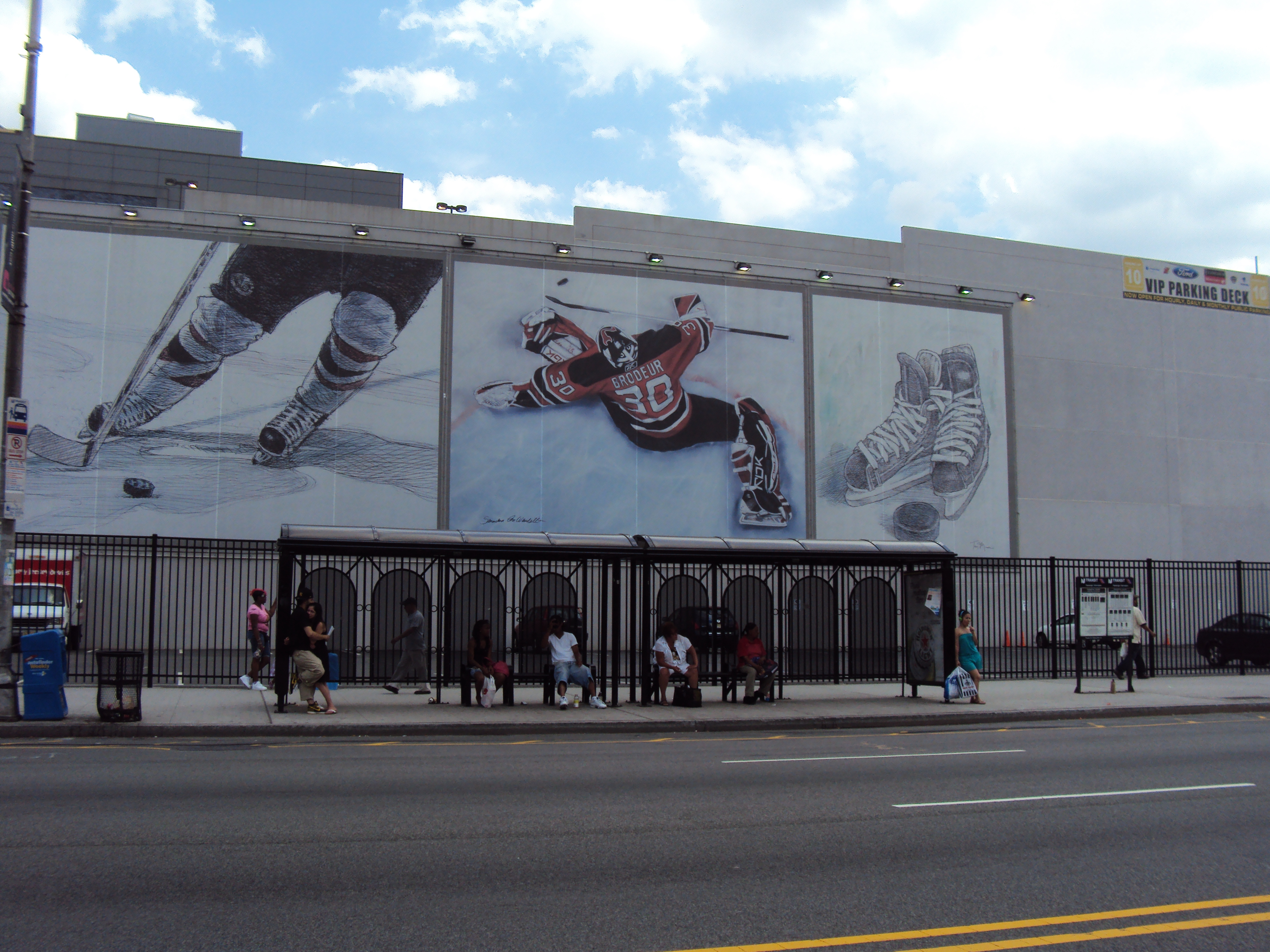
Mural

== History ==
=== Planning ===
For years, the New Jersey Devils had been rumored to be at least considering relocation. Even when the team won the Stanley Cup in 1995, it was amidst rumors that the franchise would move to Nashville. Despite playing championship-caliber hockey in the 2002–03 season culminating in a Stanley Cup that year, the Devils only averaged 14,858 fans per game at their home arena, Continental Airlines Arena at the Meadowlands Sports Complex in East Rutherford.

The arena was built amidst financial concerns and years of speculation that the Devils would relocate, despite the fact that the team was a perennial playoff contender and had been at or near the top of the NHL's standings for over a decade.

A project to build a new 18,000-seat arena in Newark first received funding from Newark's city council in 2002, when the team was owned by Puck Holdings, a subsidiary of YankeeNets. In 2004, former Lehman Brothers executive Jeffrey Vanderbeek bought the team from Puck Holdings and became a strong proponent of the proposed arena. Vanderbeek said, "The Devils need a new arena that can provide a game-day experience that is certainly equal to the best team in the National Hockey League and certainly equal to the product that is put on the ice." He also stated that he believed the arena "would take downtown Newark to a whole new level." After legal battles over both eminent domain and the city's financial participation in the arena project, the final deal was approved by council and went through in October 2004.

=== Construction and funding ===
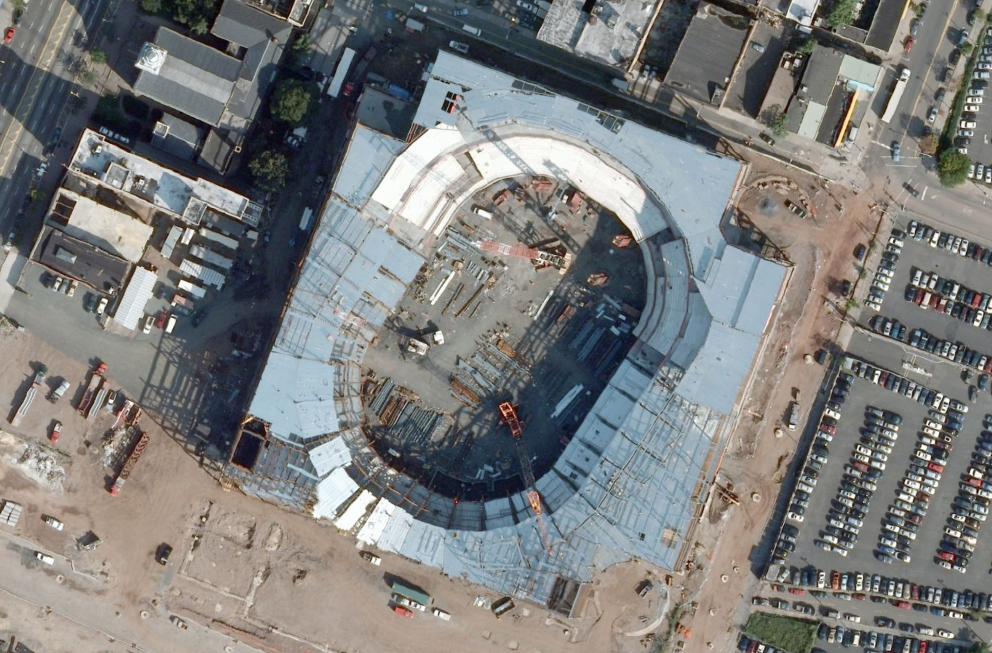
The Prudential Center under construction in June 2007

A 7-acre (2.8 ha) site for the arena in downtown Newark was selected, bordered by Edison Place on the north, Lafayette Street on the south, Mulberry Street on the east, and Broad Street on the west. The site was the location of the never-completed Renaissance Mall and, previously, the tracks and train shed of the Central Railroad of New Jersey's Broad Street station whose building still stands nearby. The arena was designed by HOK Sport, with the exterior designed by Morris Adjmi Architects. Initial designs were released in early 2005 and referred to the arena as "Newark Arena". Groundbreaking began on October 3, 2005, and a workforce of 2,725 union workers was employed to construct the arena. Financial issues, though, threatened to halt the deal. On January 24, 2006, the Devils averted having the project canceled by submitting a guarantee in writing that the team would contribute $100 million to the arena, one day before their deadline.

Though construction was well underway, in late summer 2006, Cory Booker, who had recently taken office as Mayor of Newark, promised to reevaluate the deal and considered backing out. In October, Booker conceded there would be "a first-class arena built in the city of Newark, whether we like it or not", and soon afterwards, the Devils struck a deal including both property and monetary givebacks that appeased city officials.

The city of Newark pledged to contribute $210 million to the construction of the arena, using settlement money from its lease dispute over underpaid rent for use of Newark Liberty International Airport with the Port Authority of New York and New Jersey. The Devils paid for the remainder of the cost. Thus, no new direct taxpayer funding was required for the construction of the arena. Some taxpayer dollars, however, were spent on infrastructure improvements. These improvements were necessary for both the new arena and proposed private development surrounding that arena.

Prudential Financial purchased the naming rights to the stadium in January 2007 for $105.3 million over 20 years, reducing the city's cost for the project. The arena had been referred to as "Newark Arena" before the deal. In addition to its formal name, Prudential Center was immediately nicknamed "The Rock" after Prudential's corporate logo.

Construction on the arena was completed in October 2007. The estimated final cost of the arena's construction is $380 million. In total, more than 18,000 tons of steel were used to build the bowl area and high roof, while 62,000 linear feet of ductwork were installed throughout the arena. The Devils had to play their first nine games of the 2007–08 NHL season on the road as construction on their home arena was finished.

=== Opening ===
For the soft opening on October 20, the Newark Boys Chorus performed at Prudential Center, which became the first use of the arena. It officially opened on October 25, 2007, with a series of 10 concerts by the New Jersey native rock group Bon Jovi, featuring a star-studded lineup of opening acts including Big & Rich, Gretchen Wilson, Daughtry, The All-American Rejects and fellow New Jersey native group My Chemical Romance.

The Devils played their first home game at Prudential Center on October 27, 2007, against the Ottawa Senators, who, coincidentally, were the Devils' last opponent at Continental Airlines Arena. Chris Neil scored the arena's first goal, while Brian Gionta scored the Devils' first goal in the arena. Martin Gerber earned the first win as the Senators defeated the Devils 4–1.

On November 11, 2007, the first collegiate basketball game took place in the arena, with Seton Hall defeating Monmouth, 89–81, in overtime.

=== Lighting incidents ===
On January 8, 2010, a lighting problem occurred in the arena during a game between the Devils and the Tampa Bay Lightning. Tampa Bay was leading 3–0 with 9:12 left in the second period when half of the arena's sports lights went out due to a power surge on the grid feeding electricity to the arena, followed by a computerized lighting system failing to reboot. PSEG and Prudential Center electricians worked on the situation for 1 hour and 52 minutes but could not reboot the system. The game was suspended due to the lighting problem; it was resumed two nights later, with about 3,000 of the original crowd of 15,129 in attendance. Tampa Bay won, 4–2, with Lightning center Steven Stamkos scoring two goals in the contest: one on Friday and one on Sunday.

Before a preseason game between the Devils and the New York Islanders, on October 7, 2021, the lights in the northeast corner of the arena could not be turned on due to a power outage. After a lengthy delay, the game was canceled.

== Location and accessibility ==
Prudential Center, like its three major counterparts in the New York metropolitan area—Madison Square Garden, Barclays Center, and UBS Arena—is one of the most easily accessible arenas in the country. The arena is located two blocks from Newark Penn Station in downtown Newark, which makes it walkable via New Jersey Transit, PATH, Newark Light Rail, and Amtrak. Major highways in the arena's vicinity include I-95 on the New Jersey Turnpike, I-78, I-280, US 1/9, NJ 21, US 22, and the Garden State Parkway.

The arena is just west of the Ironbound, a section of the city known for its Portuguese, Spanish and Brazilian restaurants. The venue is a block east of Halsey Street, an independent shopping and dining corridor between Washington and William, near Rutgers' Newark campus.

The arena was built in the vicinity of what was once Newark's Chinatown. It faces Mulberry Commons, a public green space built in 2019 featuring a children's play area, seating areas, and a splash pad. In 2023 the Mulberry Commons Pedestrian Bridge broke ground, billed as the High Line of Newark and slated to connect the venue and the station over McCarter Highway.

== See also ==
- New Jersey music venues by capacity
- Grant USA Tower, a proposed skyscraper in the 1980s planned for this site
- Red Bull Arena, a soccer stadium in the Newark suburb of Harrison, New Jersey for the New York Red Bulls soccer team, opened in March 2010.
- Sports in Newark, New Jersey
- List of NCAA Division I basketball arenas
- North to Shore Festival
- Chinatown, Newark, New Jersey
- QXT's Nightclub
- Mulberry Commons
- Culture of Newark, New Jersey

Preceded by Meadowlands Arena	Home of the New Jersey Devils; 2007–present	Succeeded by
Preceded by First arena	Home of the New Jersey Ironmen; 2007–2009	Succeeded by None
Preceded by Meadowlands Arena	Home of the New Jersey Nets; 2010–2012	Succeeded by Barclays Center
Preceded by Madison Square Garden	Home of the New York Liberty; 2011–2013	Succeeded by Madison Square Garden
