= Newark Broad Street station (Central Railroad of New Jersey) =

Former railway station in Newark, New Jersey, US

Newark Broad Street
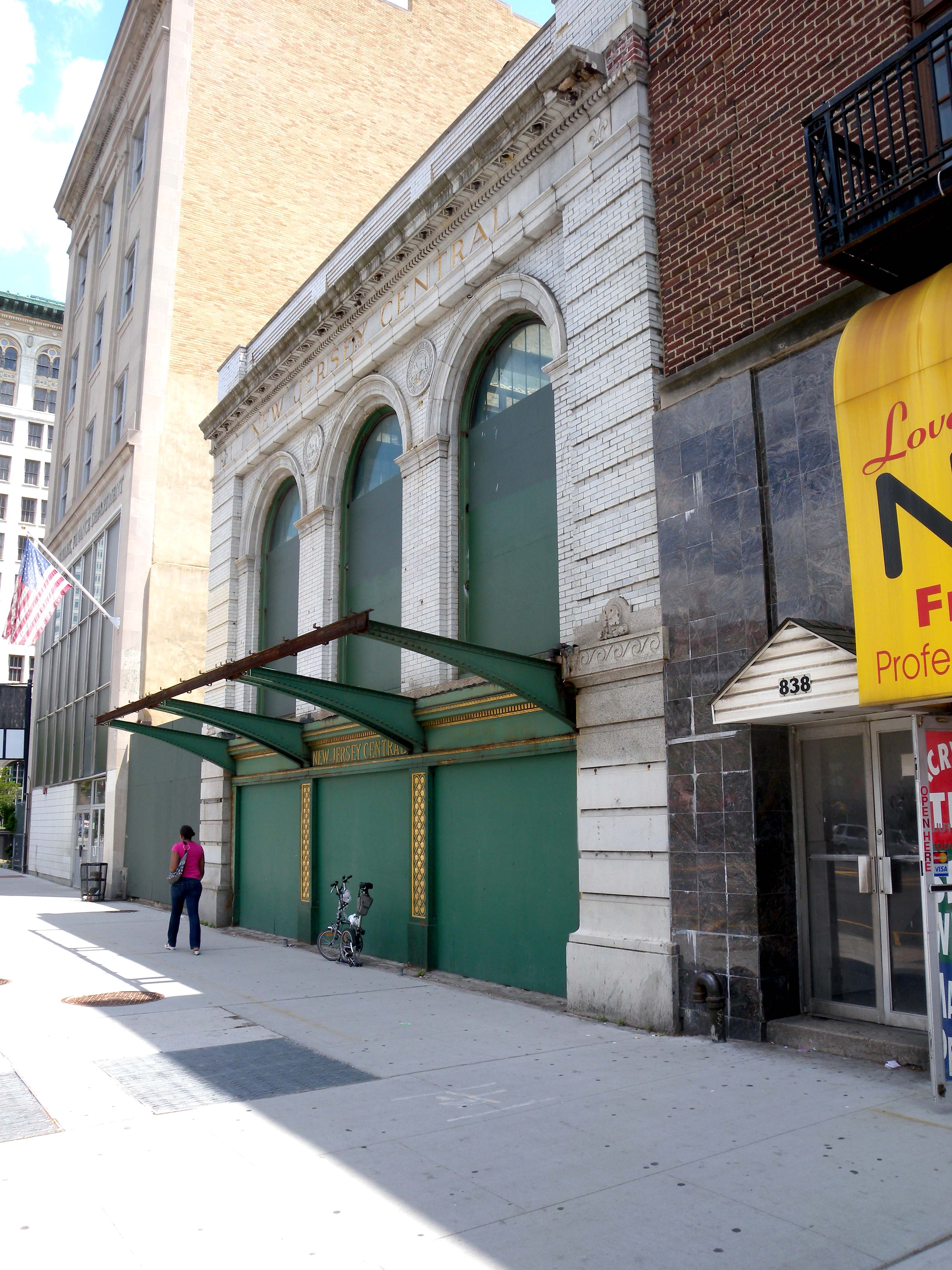
- The facade of the former station in 2009

General information
- Location: 832–836 Broad Street; Newark, New Jersey; United States
- Coordinates: 40°44′02″N 74°10′22″W
- Line: Newark and New York Branch
- Distance: 7.5 miles (12.1 km) from Jersey City

Construction
- Architect: Joseph O. Osgood
- Architectural style: Beaux-Arts

History
- Opened: August 2, 1869
- Closed: April 30, 1967
- Rebuilt: 1917

Former services
Preceding station	Central Railroad of New Jersey	Following station
Terminus	Newark and New York Branch	Ferry Street toward Jersey City
Location

Newark Broad Street station was a railway terminal in Newark, New Jersey at the western end of the Newark and New York Branch of the Central Railroad of New Jersey. The station was located on Broad Street, near Four Corners. It was approximately 2,500 feet (760 m) west of the Pennsylvania Railroad's Newark Penn Station and 1 mile (1.6 km) south of the Delaware, Lackawanna and Western Railroad's Newark Broad Street station. The building was constructed in 1917, replacing an earlier structure. The station closed in 1967 as part of the Aldene Plan. The Prudential Center arena occupies most of the site. The head house on Broad Street remains and is contributing property of the Four Corners Historic District.

== Design ==
Broad Street station was designed by Joseph O. Osgood. It had to fit within a small urban footprint: the station entrance facing Broad Street was only 40 feet (12 m) wide. The concourse, located behind Broad Street, was 60 by 166 feet (18 m × 51 m). The station had four tracks, and a small freight yard was located to the south, adjacent to Lafayette Street. A reinforced concrete trainshed covered the two island platforms, which ran east to Mulberry Street.

== History ==
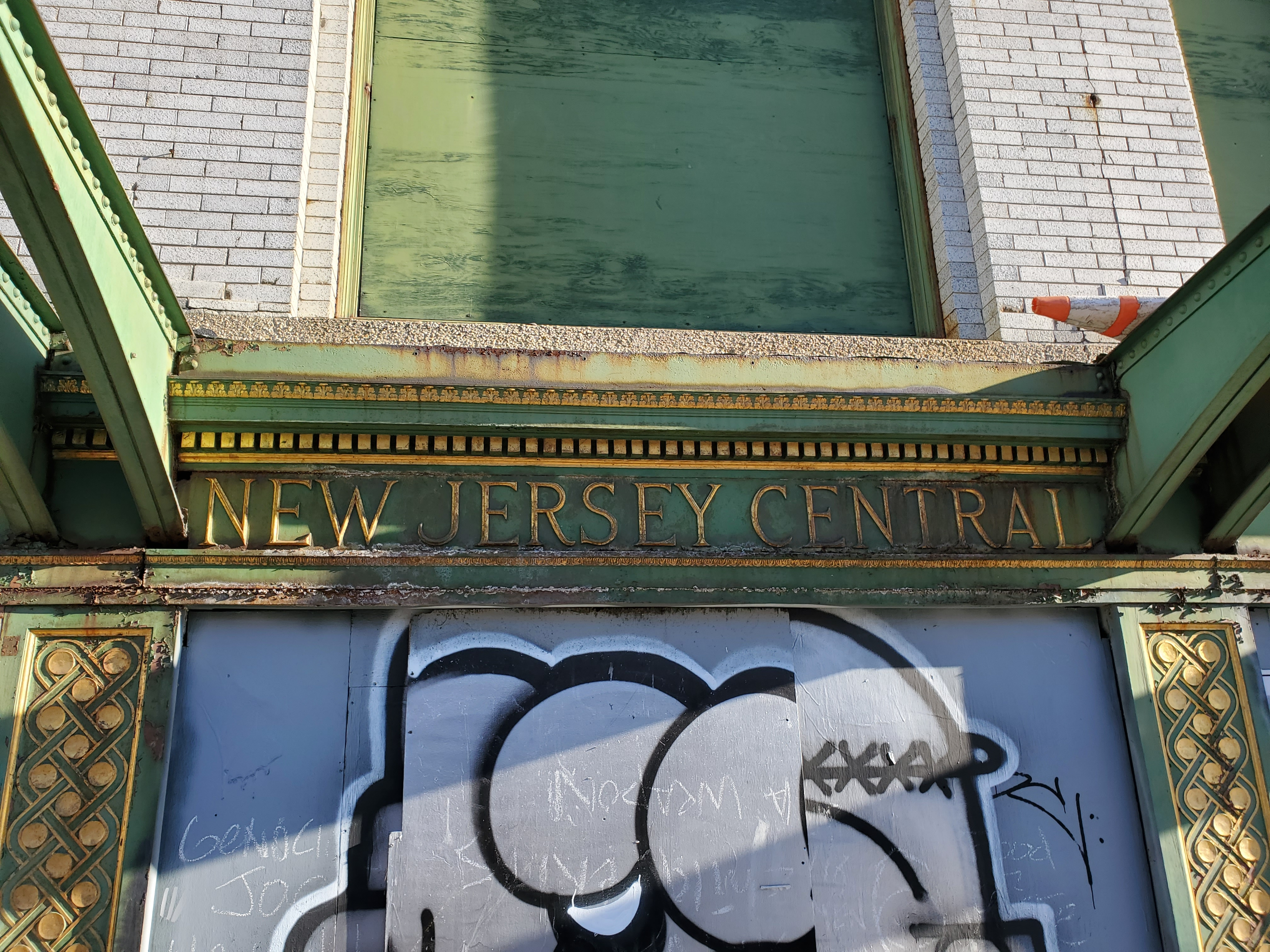
"NEW JERSEY CENTRAL" lettering on the former facade

The Central Railroad of New Jersey established the Newark and New York Railroad in 1866 to construct a branch from Jersey City, New Jersey, to Newark, New Jersey. The 6-mile (9.7 km) line cost a then-exorbitant $300,000 per mile. The line was elevated through Newark, with the Newark terminus located on Broad Street "between Fair and Mechanic." (Note: Now Lafayette Street and Edison Place, respectively.) Service over the branch began on August 2, 1869. The current building was constructed between 1916–1917 at a cost of $483,000.

Trains operated east-west over the Newark and New York branch to the Jersey City (with a ferry transfer to the Liberty Street Ferry Terminal in New York City) or north-south via the Newark and Elizabethport Branch to Perth Amboy and points beyond. In Elizabethport, passengers could transfer to trains on the Jersey Central main line.

Through service to Jersey City ended on the morning of February 3, 1946, when the collier Jaeger Seam struck and damaged the Hackensack Drawbridge, which carried the Newark and New York Branch across the Hackensack River. The Jersey Central instituted shuttle service between Newark and Kearny, and west from Jersey City to West Side Avenue. Intended as a temporary measure, this service pattern became permanent after the Jersey Central abandoned plans to rebuild the bridge.

Service at Newark Broad Street ended on April 30, 1967. Under the Aldene Plan, Jersey Central passenger trains on the main line were re-routed to serve Newark Penn Station over the Lehigh Valley Railroad. Newark Broad Street closed, and all passenger service ended on the Newark and New York branch and the Newark and Elizabethport branch.

Developer Harry Grant purchased the station from the city in 1986 for $1.2 million, with plans to build the 60,000 square feet (5,600 m^{2}) Renaissance Mall on the property. Grant subsequently declared bankruptcy, and the mall was never completed. The Prudential Center was eventually built on the same space and opened in 2007.

The head house, including the facade on Broad Street, remains and was included as a contributing property of the Four Corners Historic District in 2000. That status notwithstanding, it sold to a private developer in 2016 for retail use. As of 2024, the facade remains standing.
