= List of bridges, tunnels, and cuts in Hudson County, New Jersey =

There are numerous of vehicular and rail bridges, tunnels, and cuts in Hudson County, New Jersey. Located in the northeastern part of New Jersey, the county lies at the heart of the Port of New York and New Jersey and is a major crossroads of the New York Metropolitan area and Northeast Megalopolis. Located on two peninsulas, formerly known as Bergen Neck and New Barbadoes Neck, it has extensive waterfront along the Hudson River, Upper New York Bay, Kill van Kull, Newark Bay and the Hackensack and Passaic Rivers. The main part of Hudson lies on Bergen Hill, the southern emergence of the Hudson Palisades, starting at sea level at Bergen Point and rising to 260 feet travelling through Bayonne, Jersey City and North Hudson. Secaucus and most of West Hudson are part of the New Jersey Meadowlands. Listings are generally from south to north.

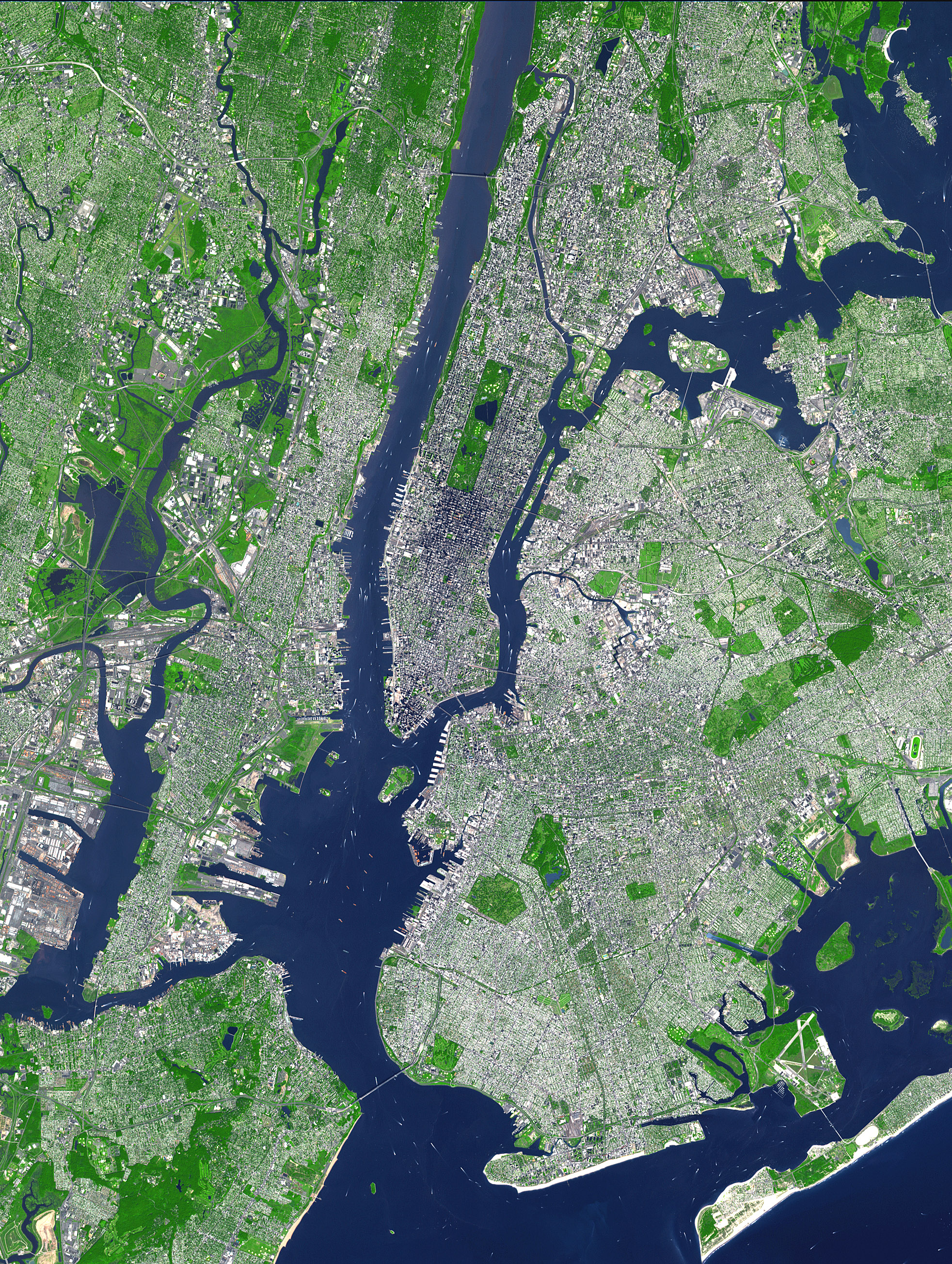
Hudson County, on left, has many hills and miles of waterfront.

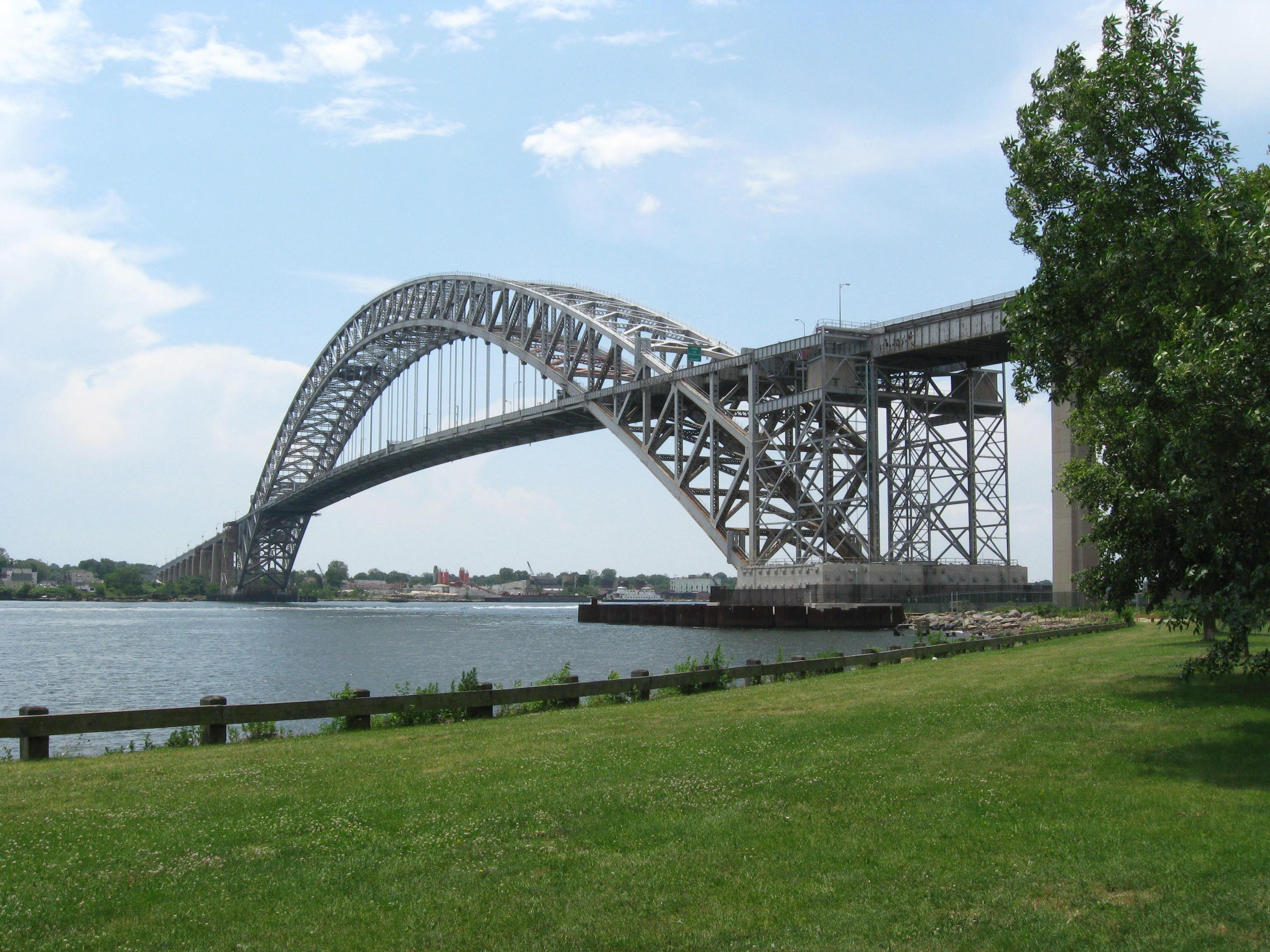
Bayonne Bridge before deck raising

== Hudson River ==
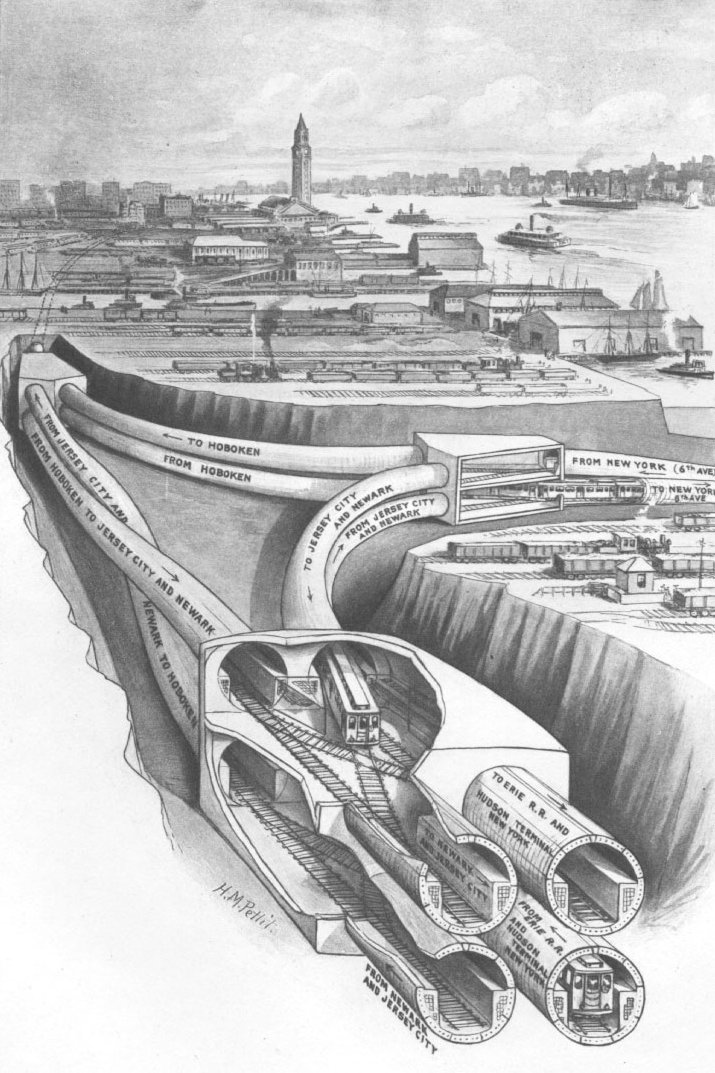
Uptown Hudson Tubes include a flying junction.

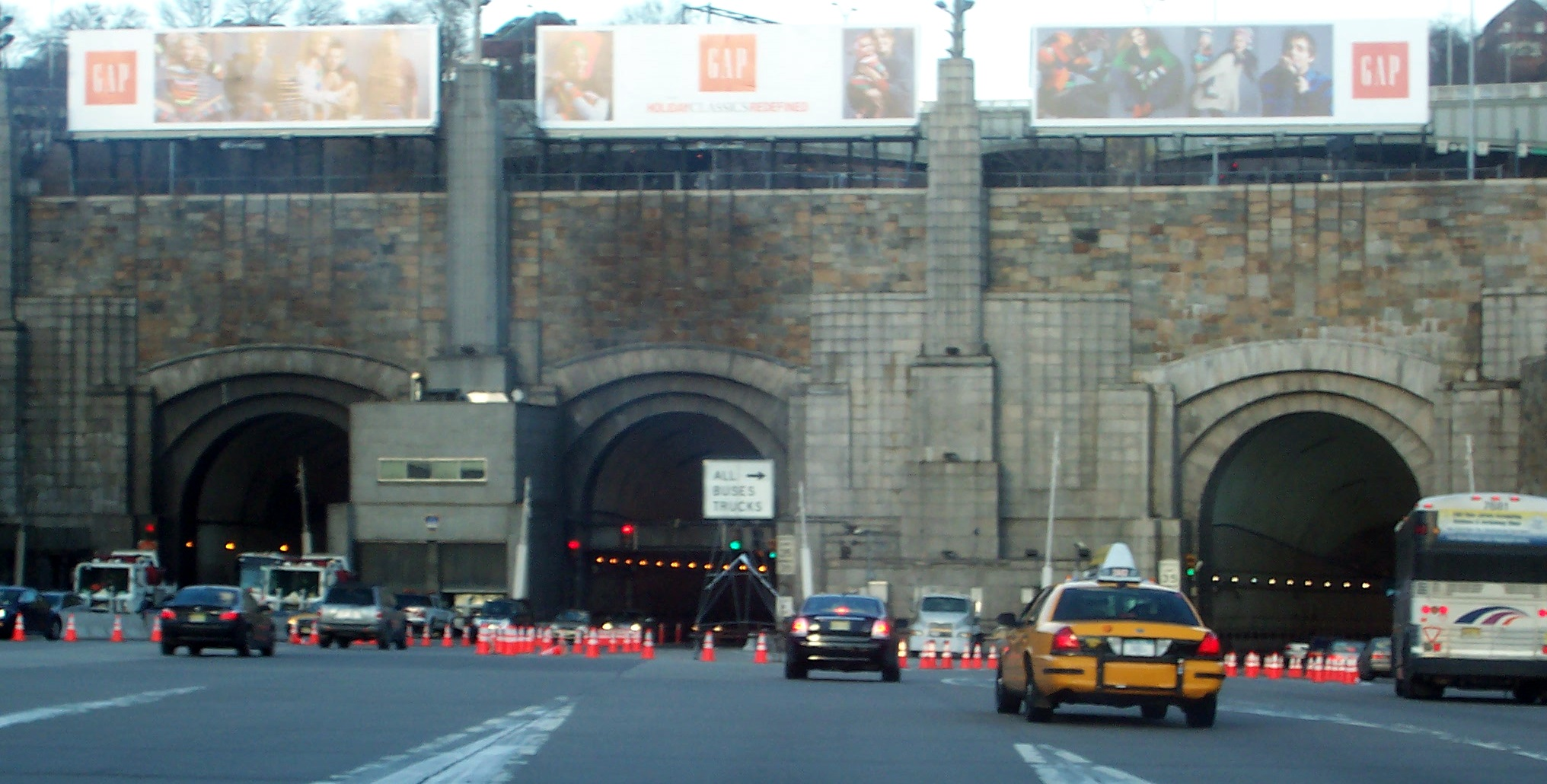
The Lincoln Tunnel comprises three tubes.

| Crossing | Carries | Location | Coordinates |
|---|---|---|---|
| Downtown Hudson Tubes | Port Authority Trans-Hudson | Jersey City and World Trade Center | 40.7151°N 74.0244°W |
| Holland Tunnel | I-78; NJ 139 | Jersey City and Lower Manhattan | 40°43′39″N 74°01′16″W |
| Uptown Hudson Tubes | Port Authority Trans-Hudson | Jersey City and Manhattan | |
| Gateway Tunnel (proposed) | Amtrak; New Jersey Transit | North Bergen and Midtown Manhattan | |
| THE Tunnel (project cancelled) | New Jersey Transit | Weehawken and Midtown Manhattan connecting Secaucus Junction and Penn Station | |
| North River Tunnels | Amtrak; New Jersey Transit | Weehawken and Midtown Manhattan | 40°45′32″N 74°00′46″W |
| Lincoln Tunnel | NJ 495 | Weehawken and Midtown Manhattan | 40°45′47″N 74°00′36″W |
The next crossing to the north and the last in New Jersey is in Bergen County
| George Washington Bridge | I-95; New Jersey Turnpike; US Route 1 US 9 US 46 | Fort Lee and Upper Manhattan | 40°51′05″N 73°57′09″W |

== Kill van Kull and Newark Bay ==
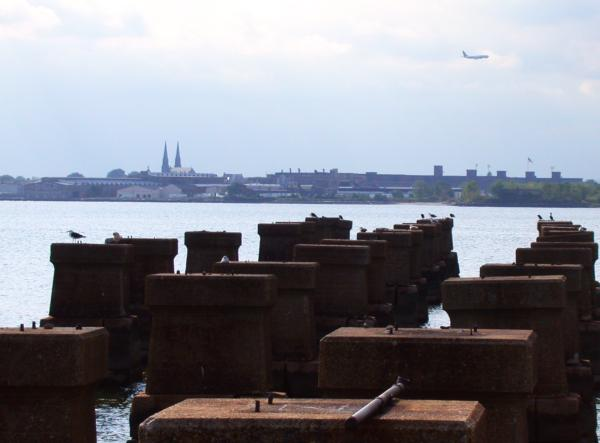
CRRNJ Newark Bay Bridge was dismantled in the 1980s.

| Crossing | Carries | Location | Coordinates |
|---|---|---|---|
| Bayonne Bridge | NJ 440; NY 440 | Bayonne - Staten Island | |
| CRRNJ Newark Bay Bridge (defunct) | Central Railroad of New Jersey | Bayonne - Elizabethport | 40.6545°N 74.15°W |
| Newark Bay Bridge | I-78; New Jersey Turnpike | Bayonne - Newark | |
| Upper Bay Bridge | CSX Transportation; Norfolk Southern; Conrail; National Docks Secondary | Bayonne - Newark | 40.699052°N 74.11°W |

== Hackensack River ==
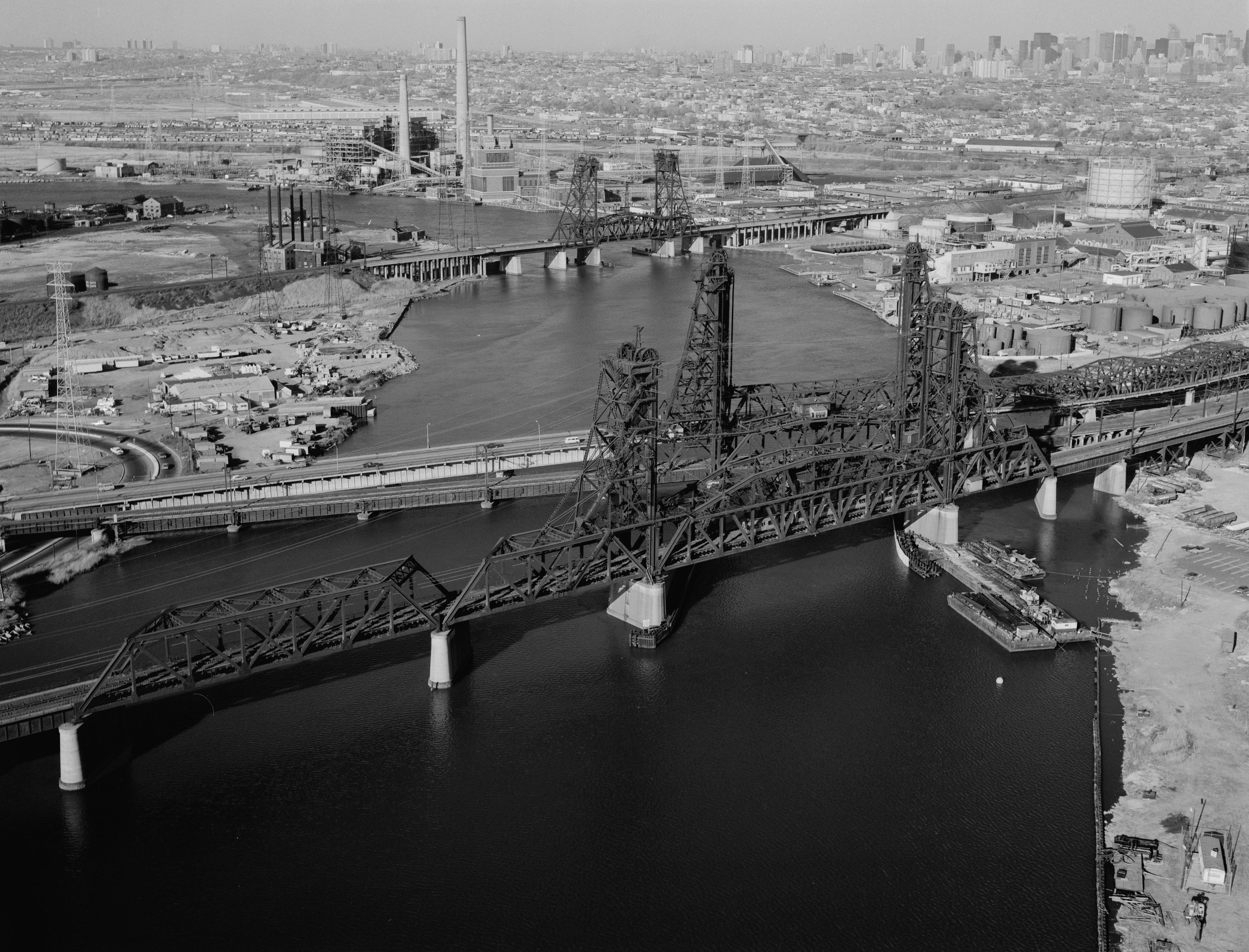
PATH, Harsimus Branch, Wittpenn, and Lower Hack in 1978

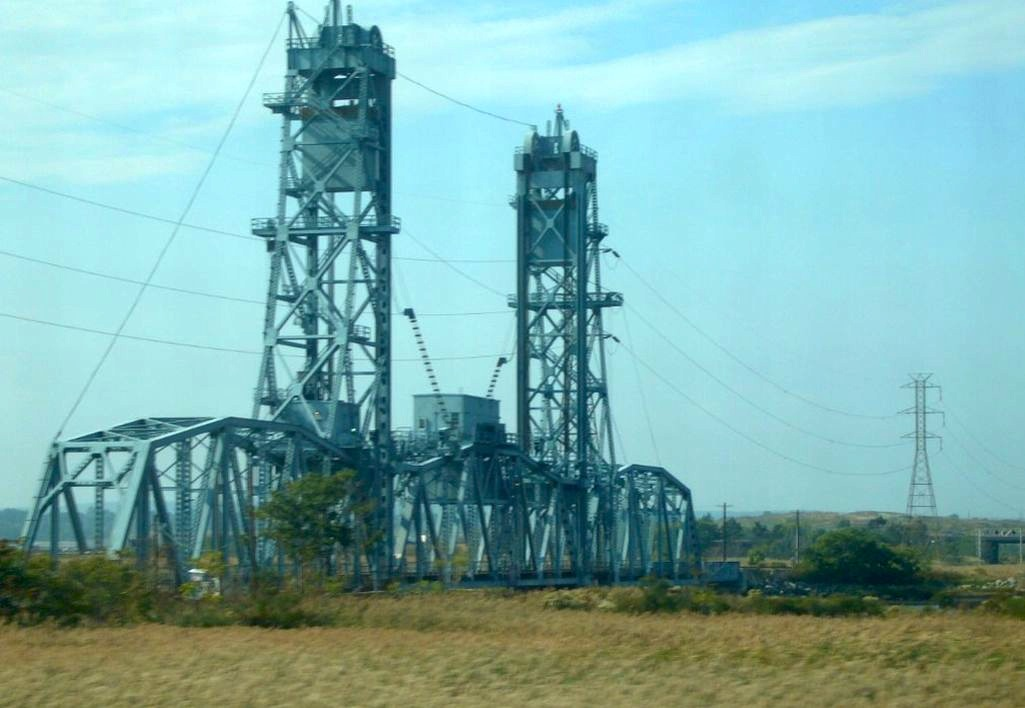
Upper Hack Lift

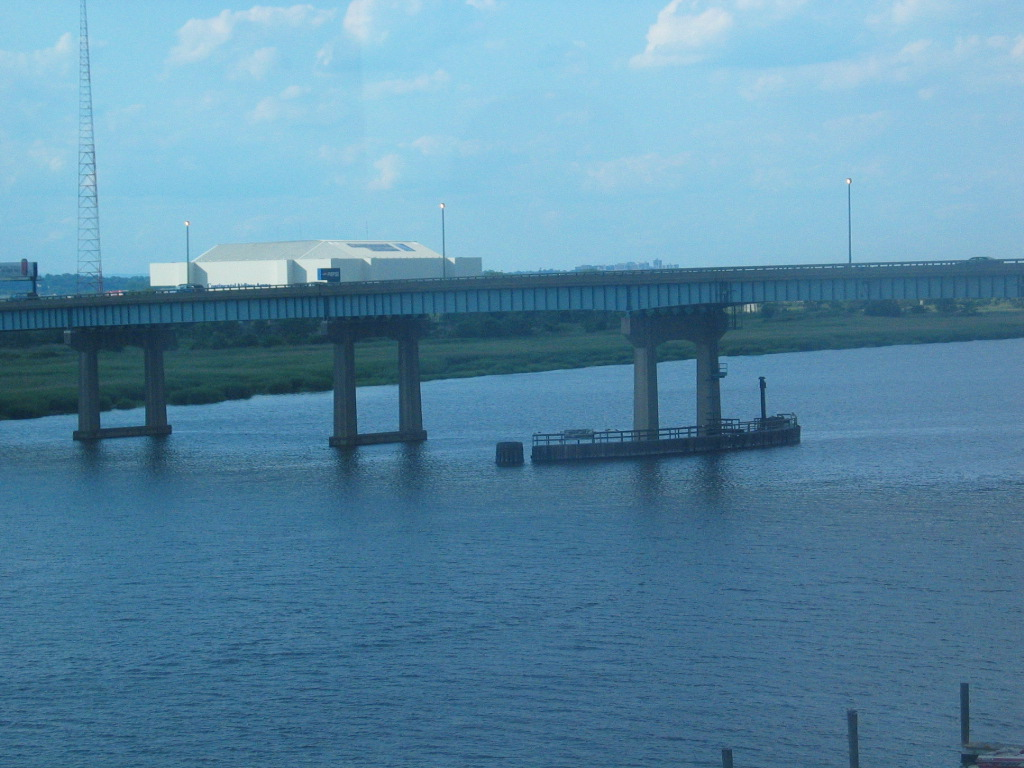
One of the twin span of Route 3

| mile | Crossing | Carries | Location | Coordinates |
|---|---|---|---|---|
| | HD Draw (defunct) | Newark and New York Branch (CNJ) | Jersey City & Kearny Point | 40.718709°N 74.103985°W |
| | Lincoln Highway Hackensack River Bridge | U.S. Route 1-9 Truck; Lincoln Highway; East Coast Greenway | Jersey City & Kearny Point | 40.727324°N 74.098728°W |
| | Pulaski Skyway | U.S. Route 1/9 | Jersey City & Kearny Point | 40.735064°N 74.09493°W |
| | PATH Lift Bridge | PATH | Jersey City & Kearny Meadows | 40.740108°N 74.083048°W |
| | Harsimus Branch Lift | Conrail | Jersey City & Kearny Meadows | 40.740475°N 74.082034°W |
| | Wittpenn Bridge | NJ 7 | Jersey City & Kearny Meadows | 40.740313°N 74.081138°W |
| 3.4 | Lower Hack Lift | NJ Transit Morris and Essex Lines | Riverbend | 40.7432°N 74.0770°W |
| 5.0 | Portal Bridge; Portal North Bridge | Amtrak Northeast Corridor | Secaucus & Kearny Meadows | 40°45′13″N 74°5′41″W |
| | Lewandowski Bridge. | Interstate 95; New Jersey Turnpike | Secaucus & Kearny Meadows | |
| | DB Draw (Abandoned) | Norfolk Southern Railway; Former NJ Transit Boonton Line; Essex–Hudson Greenway (future) | Snake Hill & Kearny Meadows | 40.7583°N 74.0933°W |
| 6.9 | Upper Hack Lift | NJ Transit Main Line | Harmon Cove & Kingsland | 40.778015°N 74.089906°W |
| 7.7 | HX Bridge | NJ Transit: Bergen County Line; Pascack Valley Line; Meadowlands Rail Line | Harmon Cove & Meadowlands Sports Complex | 40.788078°N 74.081869°W |
| | Route 3 Bridge (twin span) | NJ 3 | Secaucus & Meadowlands Sports Complex | |
| | Bridge (defunct) | Jersey City, Hoboken and Rutherford Electric Railway; Paterson Plank Road | Secaucus North End & American Dream Meadowlands | 40.801948°N 74.050333°W |

== Passaic River ==
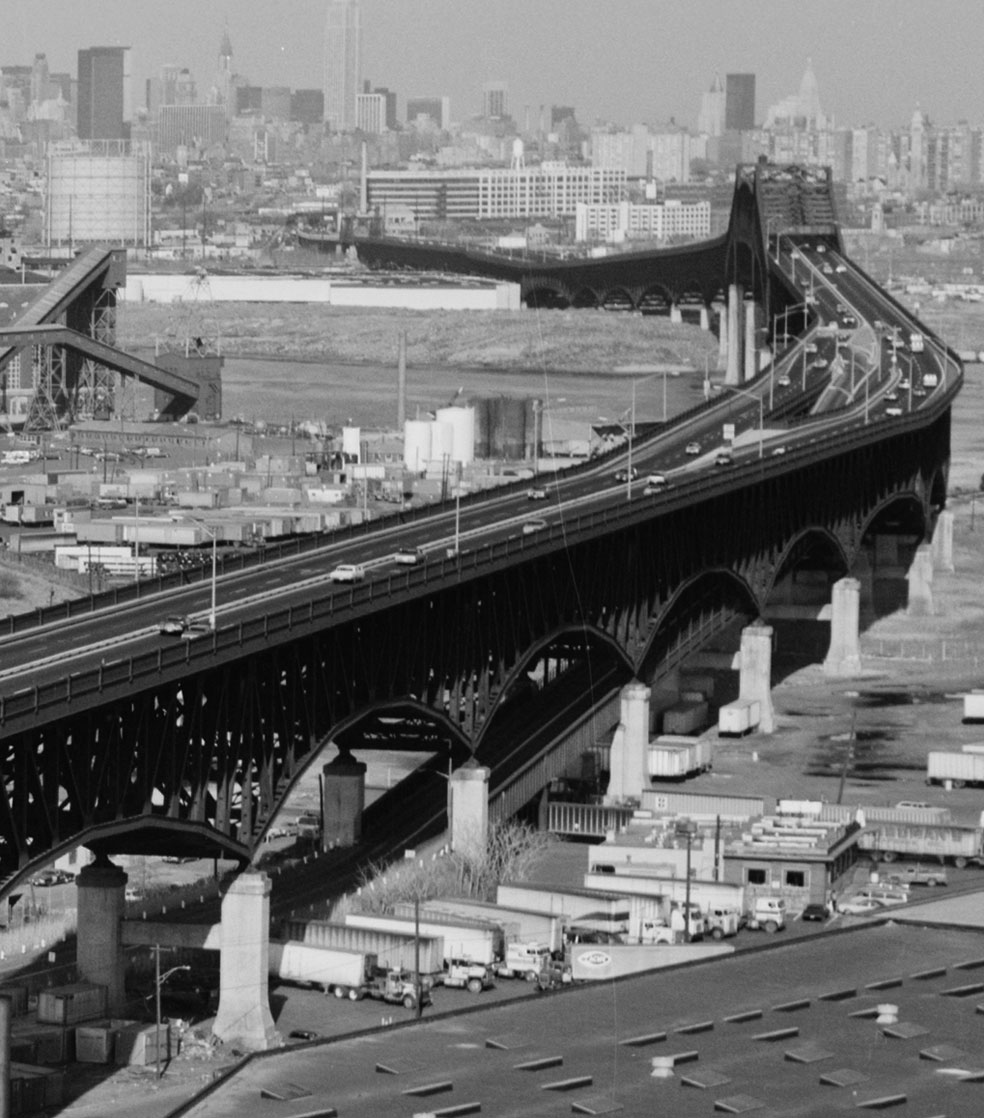
Pulaski Skyway

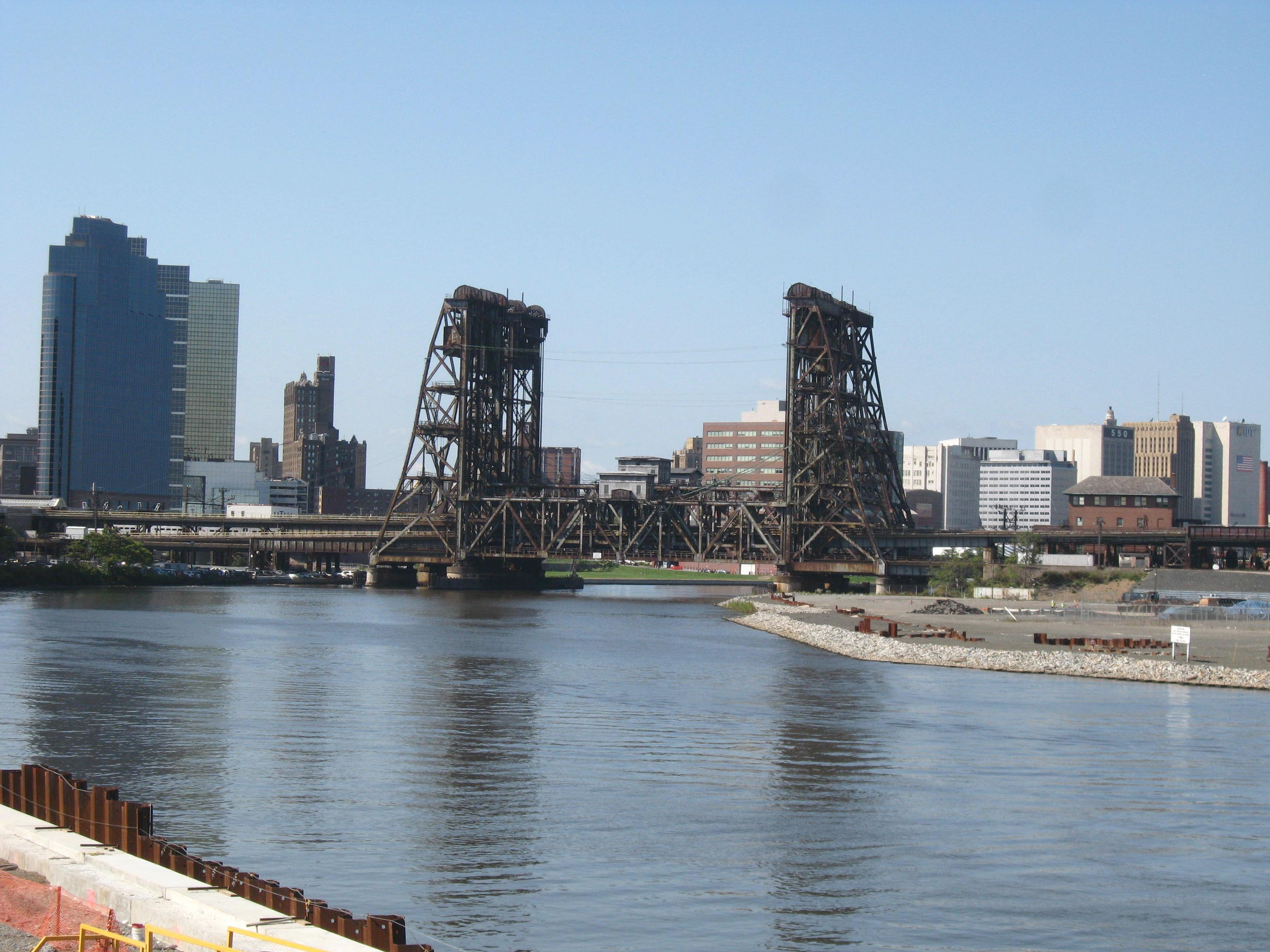
Amtrak Dock Vertical Lift

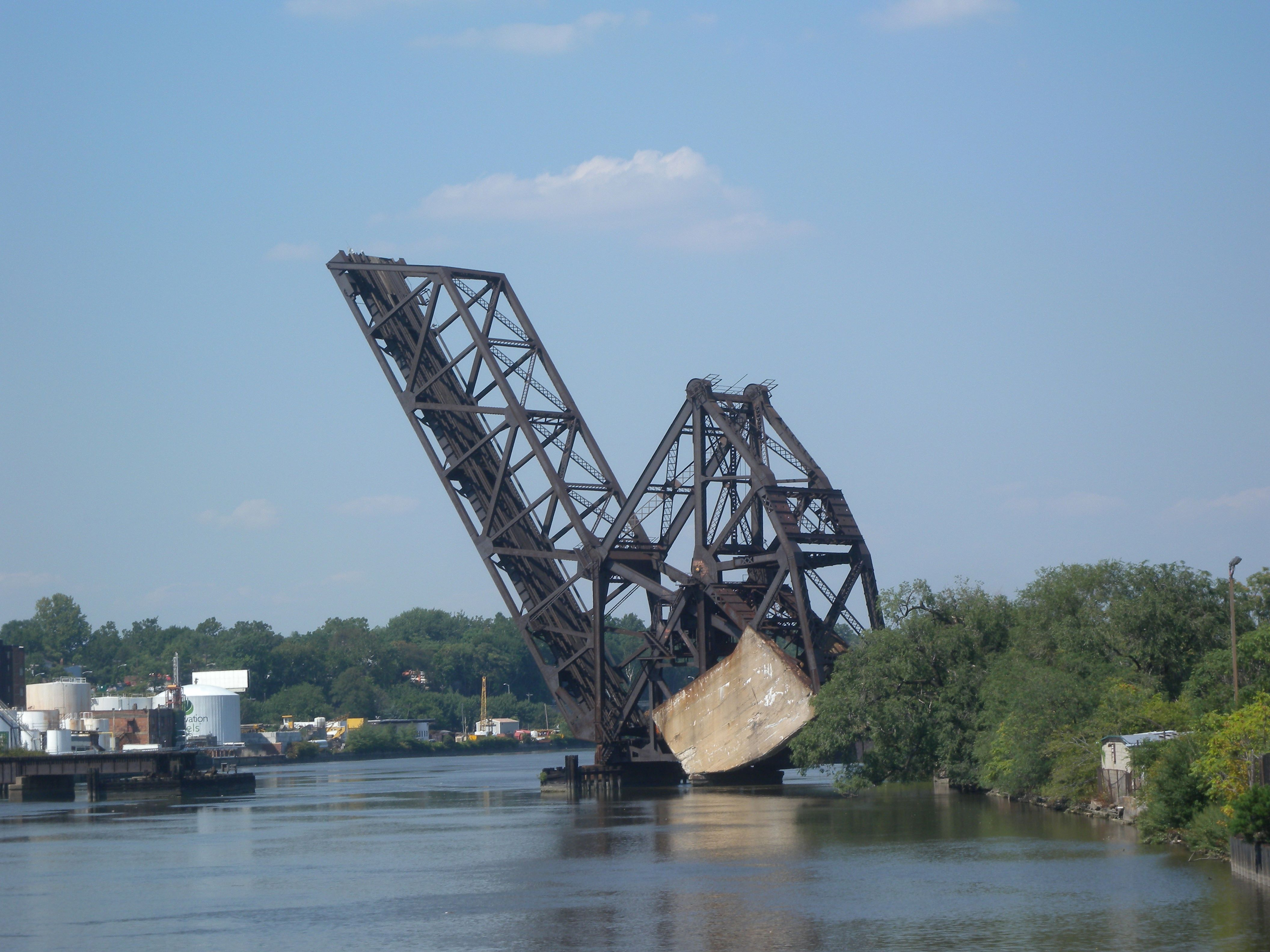
Abandoned NX, aka the Annie Bridge

| Mile | Crossing | Carries | Location |
|---|---|---|---|
| | PD Draw (defunct) | Newark and New York Branch | Kearny Point & Newark Ironbound |
| 1.8 | Lincoln Highway Passaic River Bridge | U.S. Route 1-9 Truck; Lincoln Highway | Kearny Point & Newark Ironbound |
| | Pulaski Skyway | U.S. Route 1/9 | Kearny Point & Newark Ironbound |
| 2.6 | Point-No-Point Bridge | Passaic and Harsimus Line | Kearny Meadows & Newark Ironbound |
| | Chaplain Washington–Harry Laderman Bridge | Interstate 95; New Jersey Turnpike | Kearny & Newark |
| | Jackson Street Bridge | Frank E. Rodgers Boulevard | Harrison & Newark Ironbound |
| 5.0 | Amtrak Dock Vertical Lift | Amtrak; New Jersey Transit; Port Authority Trans Hudson Newark line | Harrison & Penn Station (Newark) |
| | Centre Street Bridge (defunct) | New Jersey Railroad | Harrison & Newark |
| | Bridge Street Bridge | County Route 508 | Harrison & Newark |
| | Newark Drawbridge | New Jersey Transit | Harrison & Newark Broad Street Station |
| | William A. Stickel Memorial Bridge | Interstate 280 | Harrison & Newark |
| | Clay Street Bridge | Central Avenue; Clay Street | East Newark & Newark |
| | NX Bridge (abandoned/open position) | Erie Railroad Newark Branch | Harrison & Newark |
| | WR Draw (not in use/closed position ) | New York and Greenwood Lake Railway; Erie Railroad; New Jersey Transit Boonton Line | Kearny & North Newark |
| 8.9 | Belleville Turnpike Bridge | NJ Route 7 | Arlington & Belleville |

== Bergen Hill-Hudson Palisades ==
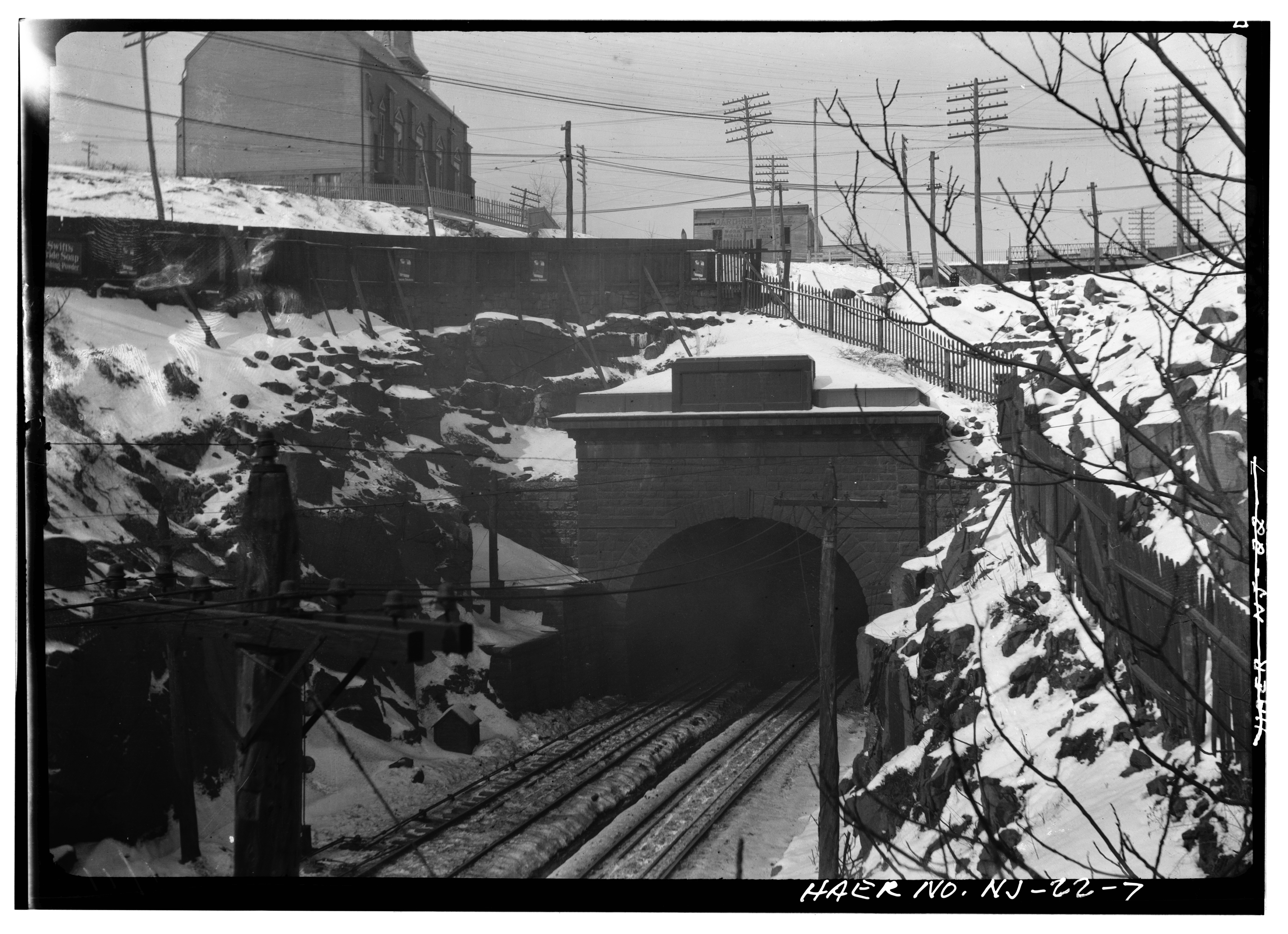
Long Dock Tunnel OR Old Bergen Tunnel, east end, taken February 10, 1906

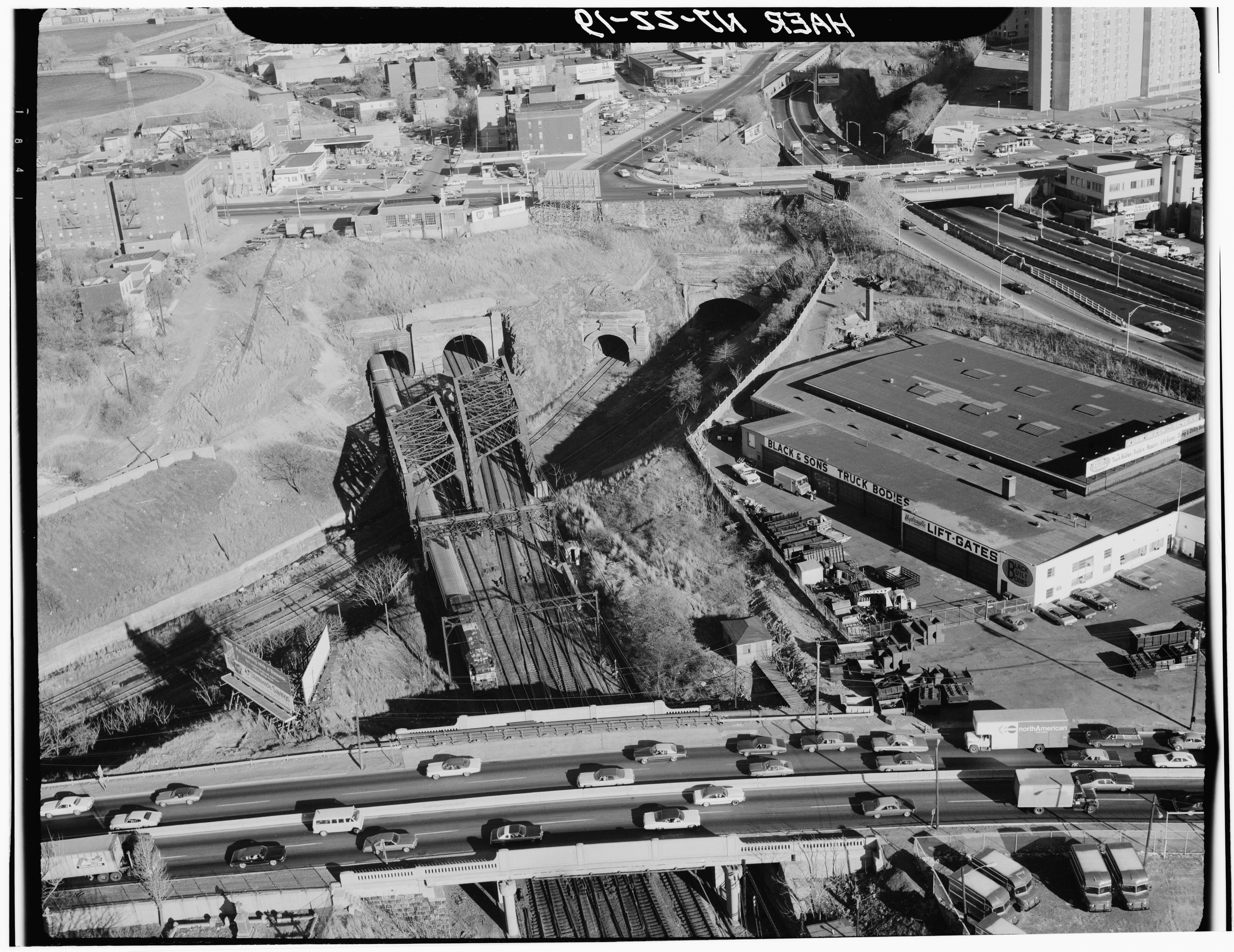
Entrances to four of the railroad tunnels under Bergen Hill

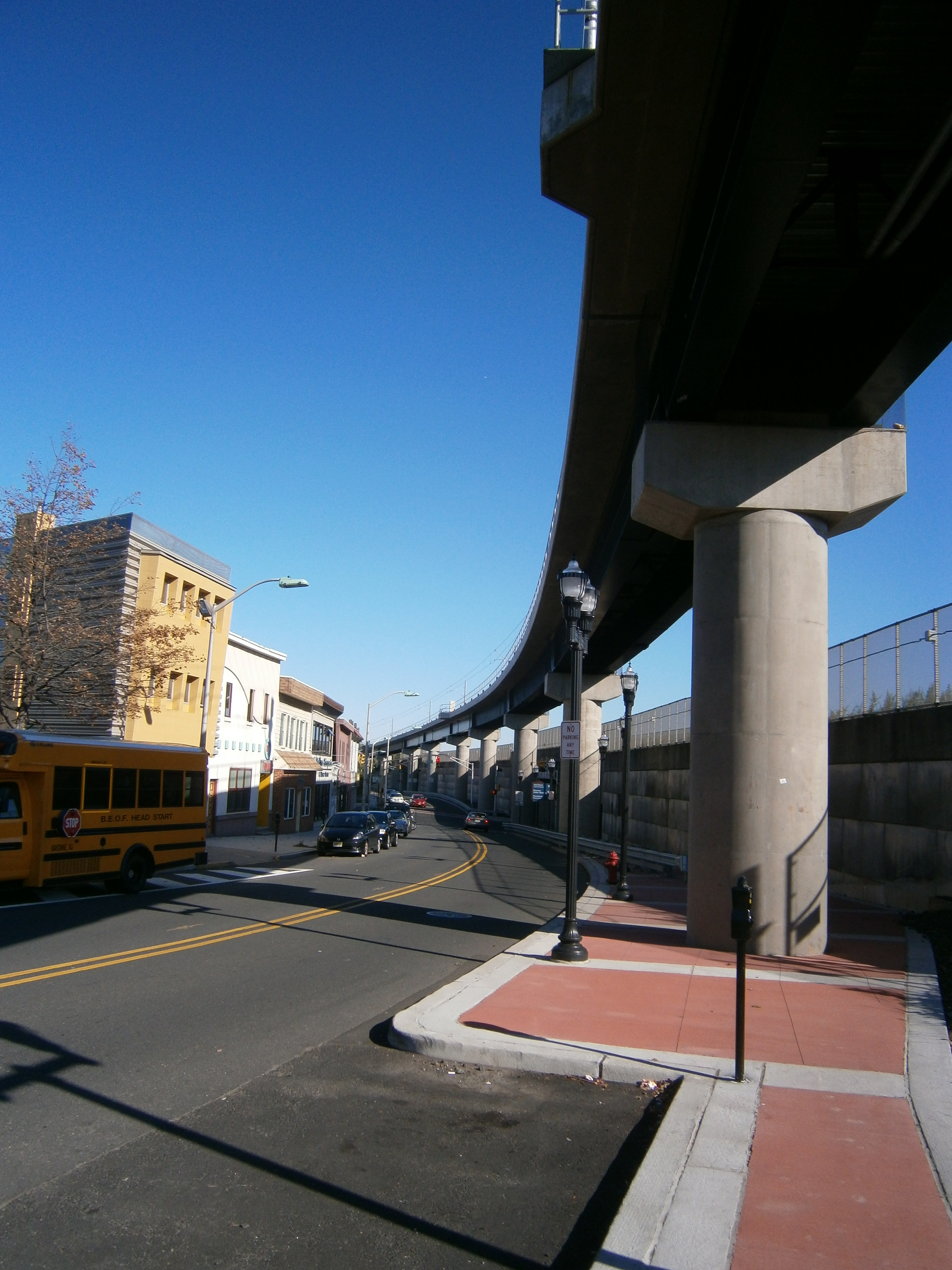
HBLR 8th Street Viaduct

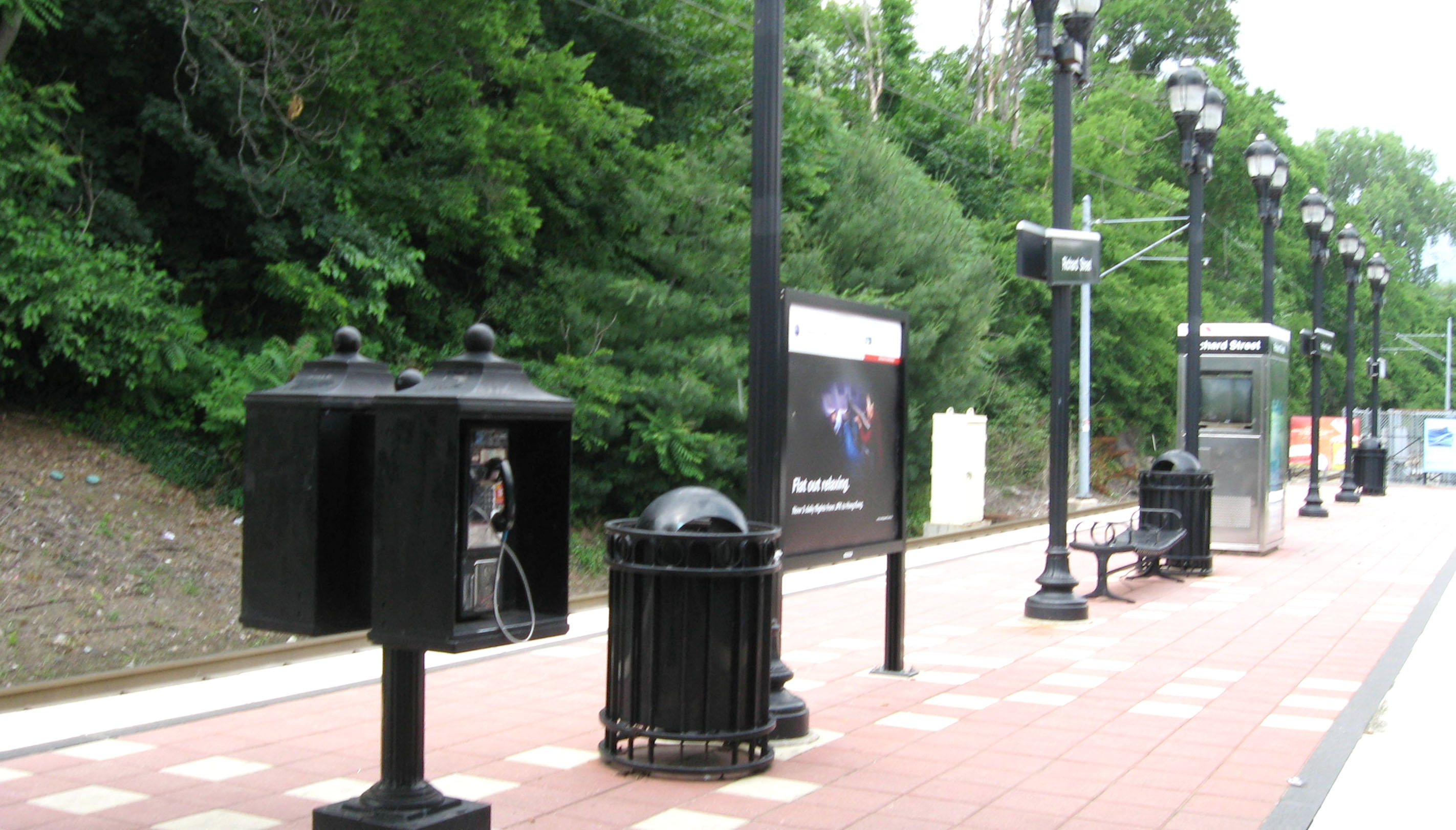
CCRNJ right-of way at Richard St Station on former Morris Canal

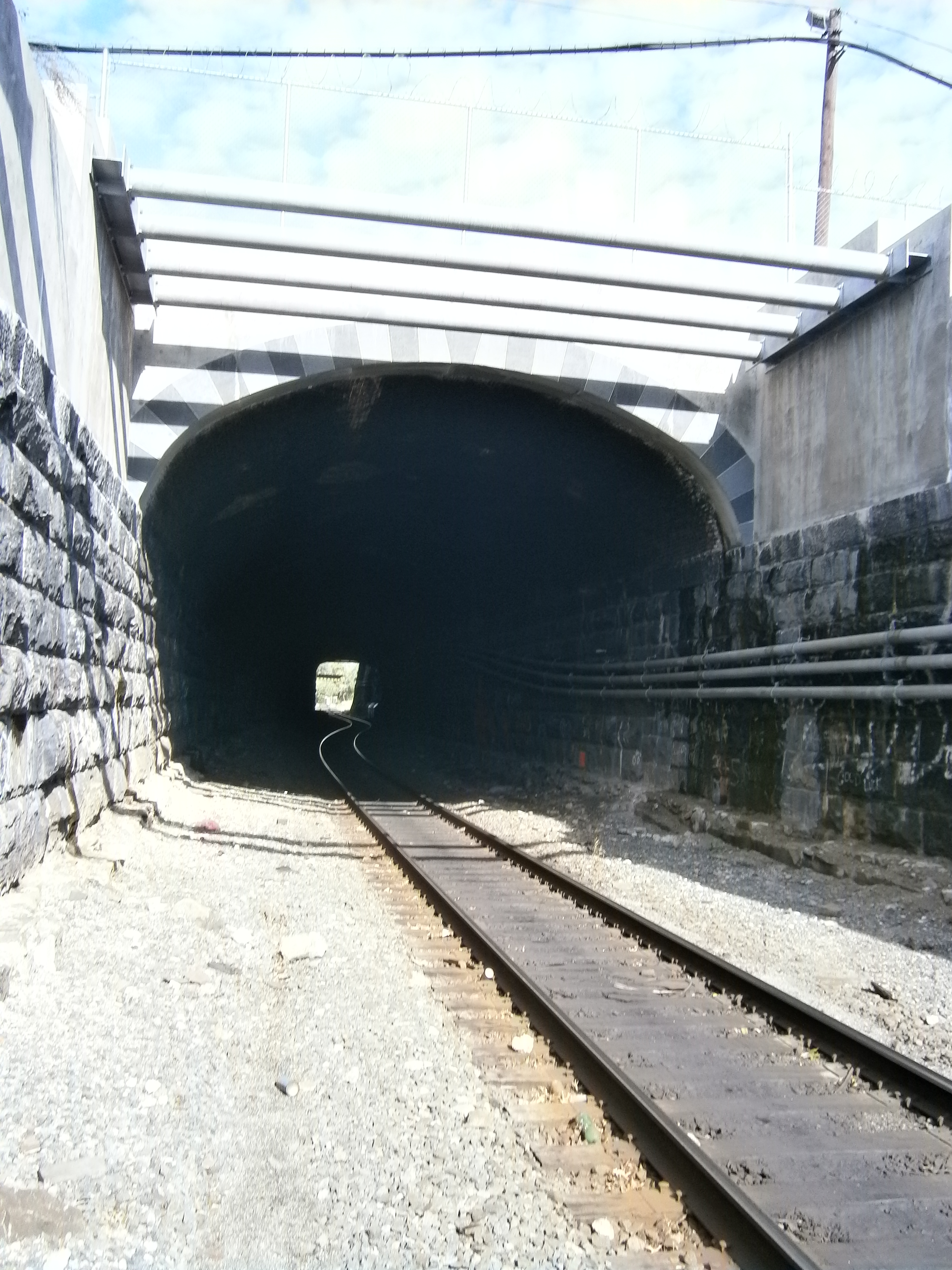
National Docks Secondary

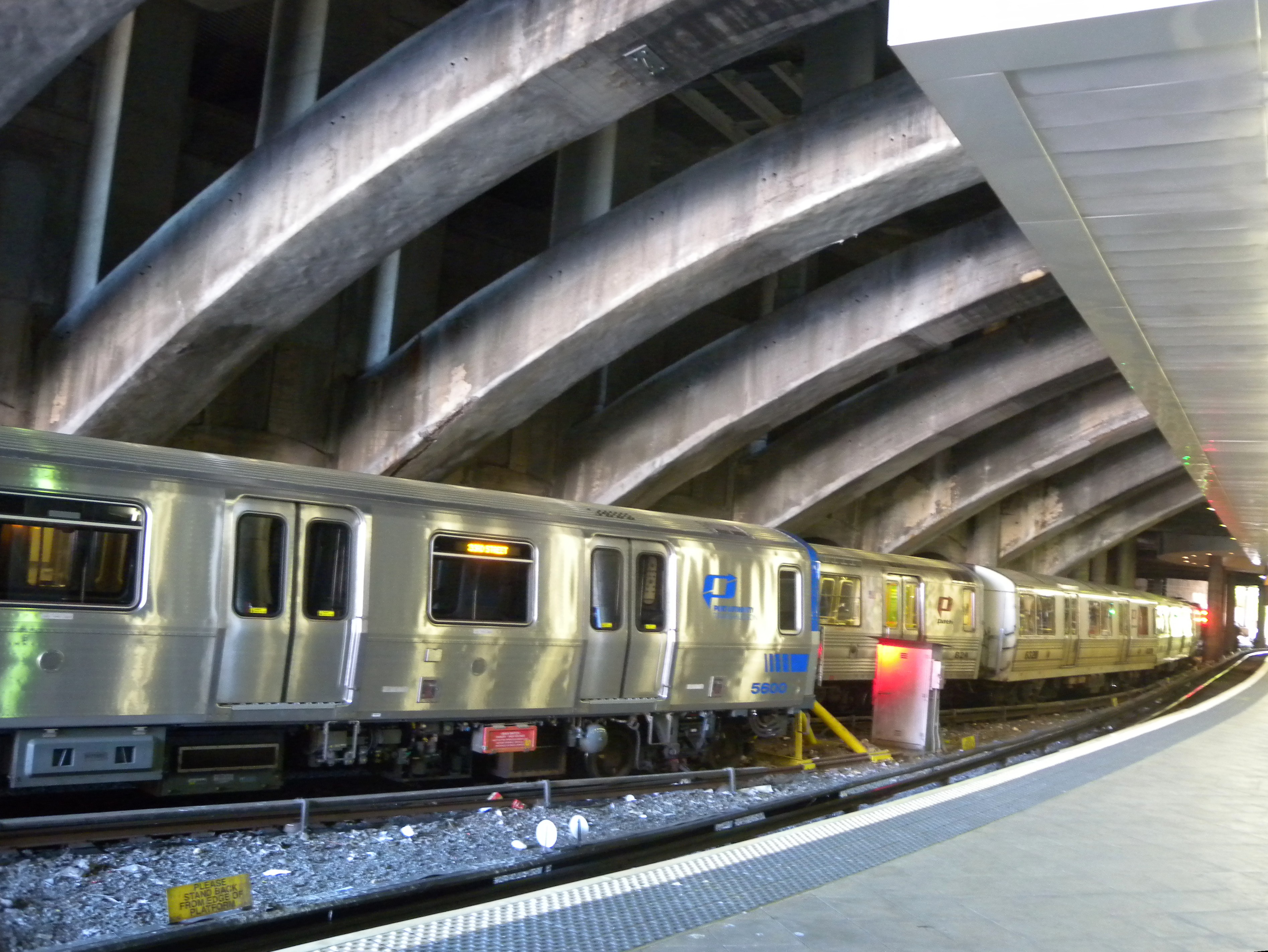
Journal Square Transportation Center was built over Bergen Hill Cut.

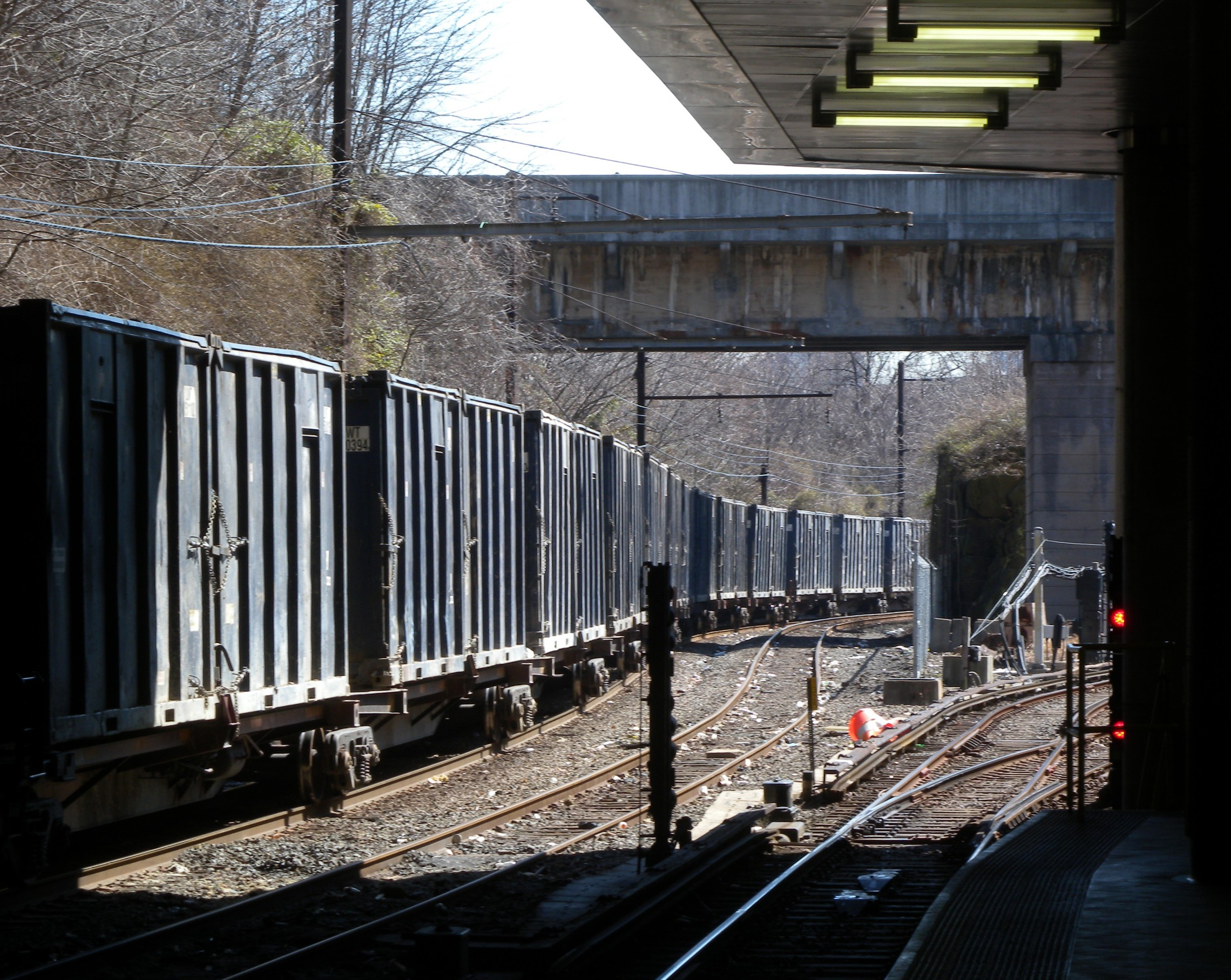
Bergen Hill Cut is also used by Conrail's North Jersey Shared Assets lines.

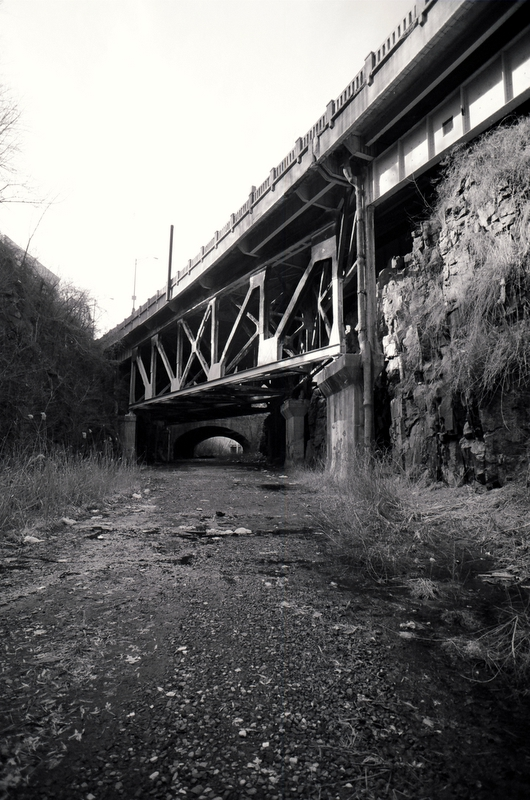
The Bergen Arches seen behind NJ Turnpike viaduct

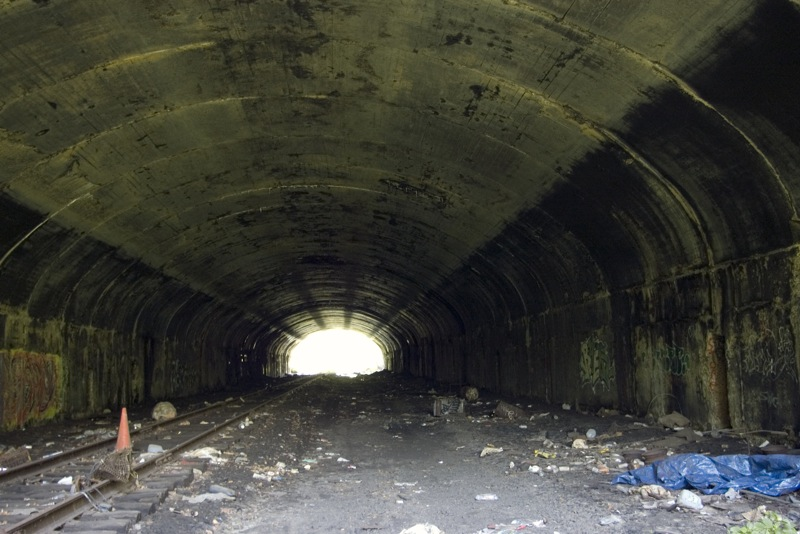
One of the Bergen Arches

| Railroad tunnels, cuts, viaducts and right of ways | Location | original use | Current use |
|---|---|---|---|
| Central Railroad of New Jersey | Bayonne and Greenville | Main Line to Communipaw Terminal partially built along the former Morris Canal | Hudson Bergen Light Rail; Liberty State Park - 8th Street |
| Lehigh Valley Terminal Railway | Bayonne, Greenville, Downtown Jersey City | Jersey City, Newark and Western Railway | National Docks Secondary; CSX Transportation to Port Jersey, Constable Hook, Croxton Yard & other points in Port of New York and New Jersey and North Jersey Shared Assets Area |
| Newark and New York Railroad (1869) | West Side & Bergen-Lafayette, Jersey City | Central Railroad of New Jersey line from Downtown Newark to CRRNJ Terminal | Hudson-Bergen Light Rail West Side Branch |
| National Docks Secondary (1897) | Downtown Jersey City | National Docks | North Jersey Shared Assets; CSX Transportation |
| Bergen Hill Cut (1838) | Journal Square | New Jersey Rail Road and Transportation Company to Paulus Hook; Pennsylvania Railroad to PRR Station at Exchange Place or Harsimus Branch to Harsimus Cove | PATH Journal Square and Newark lines North Jersey Shared Assets Area |
| Harsimus Stem Embankment | Harsimus & Hamilton Park | Harsimus Branch to Harsimus Cove Pennsylvania Railroad railyard and abattoir | unused |
| Bergen Arches (1910) | Journal Square & Jersey City Heights | 2nd Erie Cut; Erie Railroad to Pavonia Terminal | unused |
| Long Dock Tunnel (1860) | Journal Square & Jersey City Heights | First Erie Cut to Pavonia Terminal | Norfolk Southern |
| Bergen Tunnels (1876) & (1908) | Jersey City Heights | Morris and Essex Railroad; Delaware, Lackawanna, and Western; Erie Lackawanna | New Jersey Transit to Hoboken Terminal. |
| Hoboken Elevated | Hoboken Terminal - Palisade Avenue | North Hudson County Railway; Public Service Railway | dismantled after bustitution in 1949 |
| Gateway Tunnel (proposed) | Amtrak; New Jersey Transit | North Bergen and Midtown Manhattan | |
| THE Tunnel | North Bergen - Weehawken | New mass transit tunnel that will connect Secaucus Junction with an expanded Penn Station (New York) | construction cancelled October 2010 |
| New York Tunnel Extension (1910) western entrance Bergen Portal | North Bergen - Weehawken | Pennsylvania Railroad to North River Tunnels | Amtrak; New Jersey Transit: Northeast Corridor Line; North Jersey Coast Line; Train to the Game |
| Eldorado Cut (1893) | Weehawken | for streetcar line connecting waterfront ferries via elevator to the entrance of late 19th century Eldorado Park and North Hudson Railway streetcar lines to Nungessers | |
| Weehawken Tunnel (1861) | North Bergen - Weehawken Port Imperial | New York Central West Shore Railroad | Hudson Bergen Light Rail; Bergenline Station |
The next cut and tunnel to the north and the last in New Jersey is in Bergen County
| Edgewater Tunnel (1894) | Fairview - Shadyside, Edgewater | New York, Susquehanna and Western Railway cut and tunnel | unused |

| vehicular cuts | carries | location | connection |
|---|---|---|---|
| State Highway (Depressed Highway) | New Jersey Route 139 | Jersey City | Pulaski Skyway - Holland Tunnel |
| Lincoln Tunnel Approach/Lincoln Tunnel Helix | NJ Route 495 | North Hudson | New Jersey Turnpike - Lincoln Tunnel |
The next vehicular cut to the north and the last in New Jersey is in Bergen County
| GWB Plaza | | Fort Lee | to George Washington Bridge |
There are numerous excavations for roads on the eastern escarpment of the Hudson Palisades, including New York Avenue, Mountain Road, Paterson Plank Road, Wing Viaduct, Hackensack Plank Road, Shippen Street, Boulevard East, Pershing Road, Bull Ferry Road, Gorge Road

== Meadowlands ==
The Sawtooth Bridges carry the Northeast Corridor over NJ Transit, PATH, and Conrail.

== See also ==
- List of bridges documented by the Historic American Engineering Record in New Jersey
- List of tunnels documented by the Historic American Engineering Record in New Jersey
- Timeline of Jersey City area railroads
