= PD Draw =

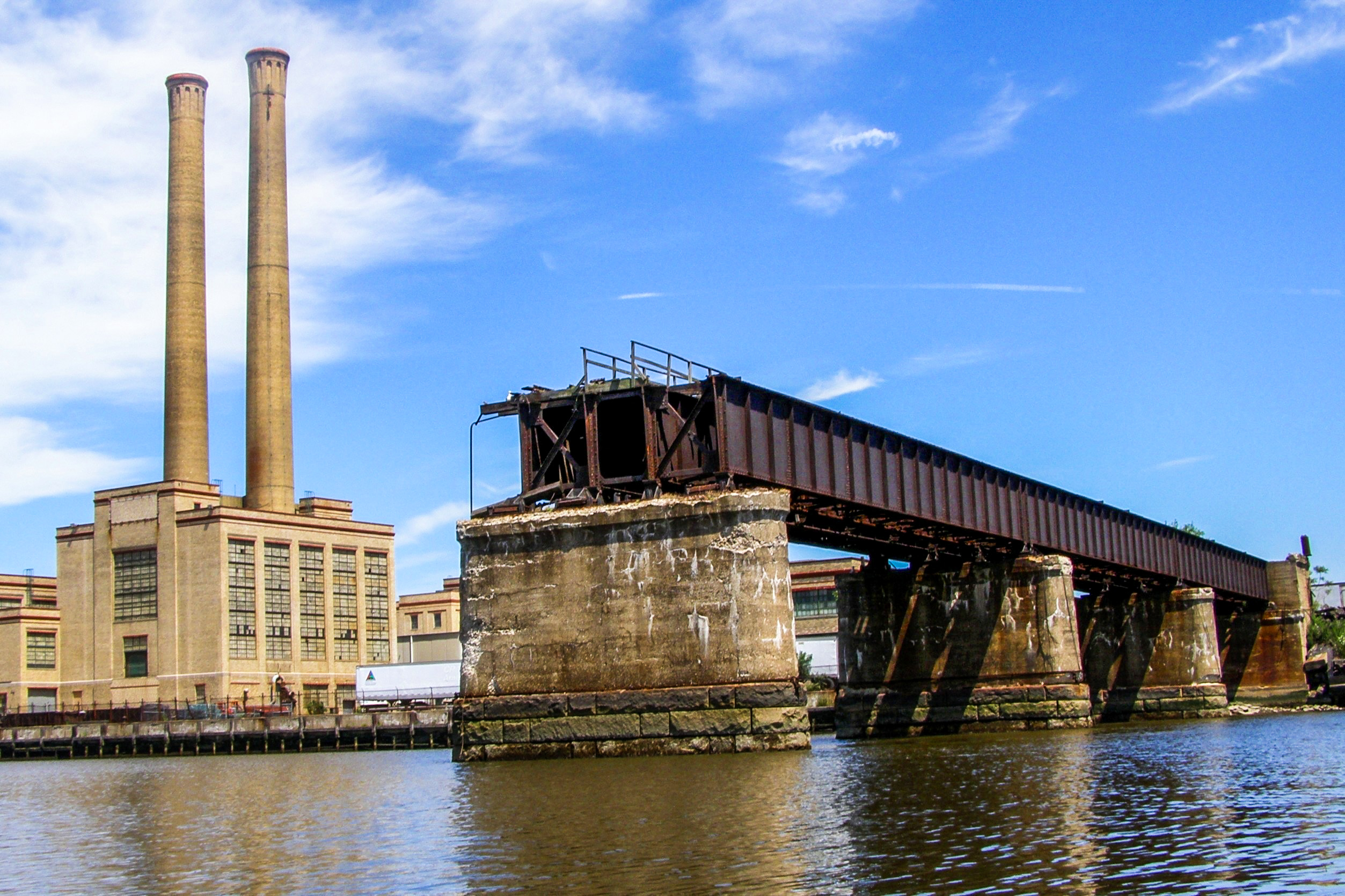
- Coordinates: 40°43′23″N 74°07′17″W
- Carries: Newark and New York Branch
- Crosses: Passaic River
- Locale: Newark and Kearny; Northeastern New Jersey, USA
- Owner: Conrail

Characteristics
- Design: Swing bridge
- Longest span: 212 feet (65 m) (removed)

History
- Opened: 1912
- Closed: 1976

The PD Draw is a partially dismantled railroad bridge on the Passaic River between Newark and Kearny in the US state of New Jersey. It was built as part of Central Railroad of New Jersey line known as the Newark and New York Branch. The swing bridge is the first crossing upstream from Newark Bay at mile point 1.2.

== History ==
At the north end of the bay at Kearny Point, the mouths of both the Passaic and the Hackensack River meet at the tip of a peninsula once known as New Barbadoes Neck. In order to build the line, the CNJ built bridges across the rivers, with service beginning in 1869. The original bridge was replaced in 1888. In 1912, the 212-foot (65 m) swing span was relocated 185 feet (56 m) upstream to create another bridge on a new alignment. The entire line across the rivers and Kearny Point was raised about 30 feet (9.1 m) to avoid conflicts with maritime traffic in the newly developing Port Newark.

In February 1946, a freighter damaged the HD Draw over the Hackensack, and when it was decided not to repair that bridge the railroad discontinued through service from its Communipaw Terminal in Jersey City. To minimize maintenance costs, the bridge over the Passaic was reduced from two tracks to one in 1955.

The Kearny station was an important stop for the railroad as it was within walking distance of the Western Electric plant and other key industries, such as the Federal Shipbuilding and Drydock Company. Until the Aldene Plan was implemented in May 1967, the PD Draw was used for local passenger service between Kearny and CNJ's Broad Street Station and for local freight train service. The railroad also ran through-train service from point on its mainline and Newark Branch to the Kearny station; the last such service was a weekday rush-hour train between Kearny and Plainfield on April 29, 1967. After the Aldene Plan took effect, the bridge was used for a few years for local freight operations, but was taken out of service with the creation of Conrail on April 1, 1976.

In October 1970, in what was determined to be an act of sabotage, a 22-car freight train that included five engines was secretly assembled at the nearby railyard and intentionally let plunge from the bridge left in the open position, a standard procedure during overnight hours.

The center span of the bridge has been removed. The abutments and piers remain in place. The New Jersey Department of Transportation is considering building a new bridge along the alignment. Studies are being conducted as part of an extensive project conceived to facilitate freight transshipment through the Port of New York and New Jersey known as Portway. A new bridge could include a rail component. The new structure would allow for a dual bridge crossing in combination with the Lincoln Highway Passaic River Bridge.

== See also ==
- Hackensack Drawbridge
- Timeline of Jersey City area railroads
- List of crossings of the Lower Passaic River
- List of bridges, tunnels, and cuts in Hudson County, New Jersey
- List of crossings of the Hackensack River
