= Newark Bay =

Estuary in northeastern New Jersey, US

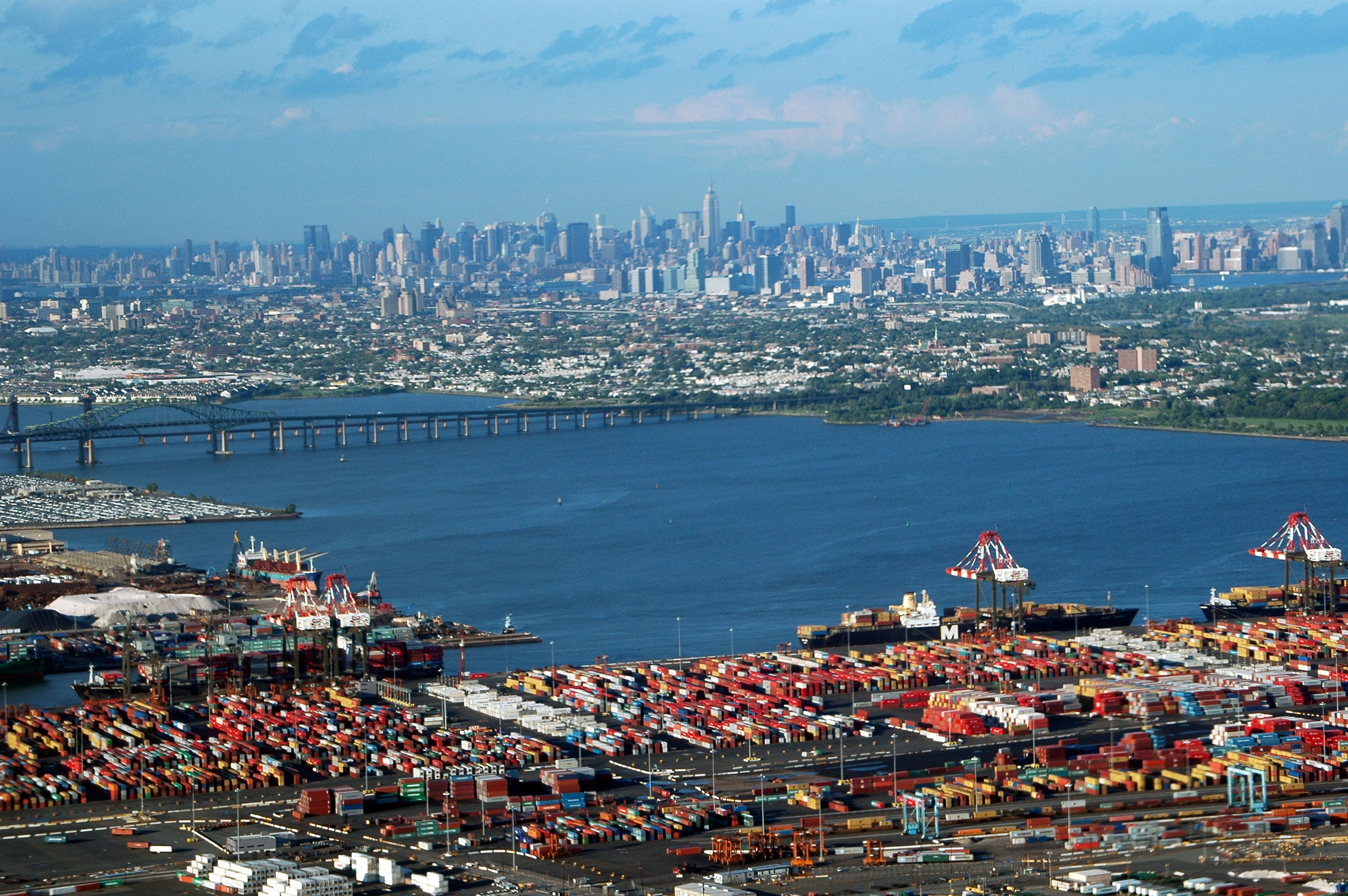
- Port Newark is seen in the foreground looking northeast across the bay to Jersey City and the Manhattan borough of New York City.

- Location: New Jersey
- Coordinates: 40.679597°N 74.131451°W
- Type: Bay

Newark Bay is a tidal bay at the confluence of the Passaic and Hackensack Rivers in northeastern New Jersey. It is home to the Port Newark-Elizabeth Marine Terminal, the largest container shipping facility in Port of New York and New Jersey, the second busiest in the United States. An estuary, it is periodically dredged to accommodate seafaring ships.

== Geography ==
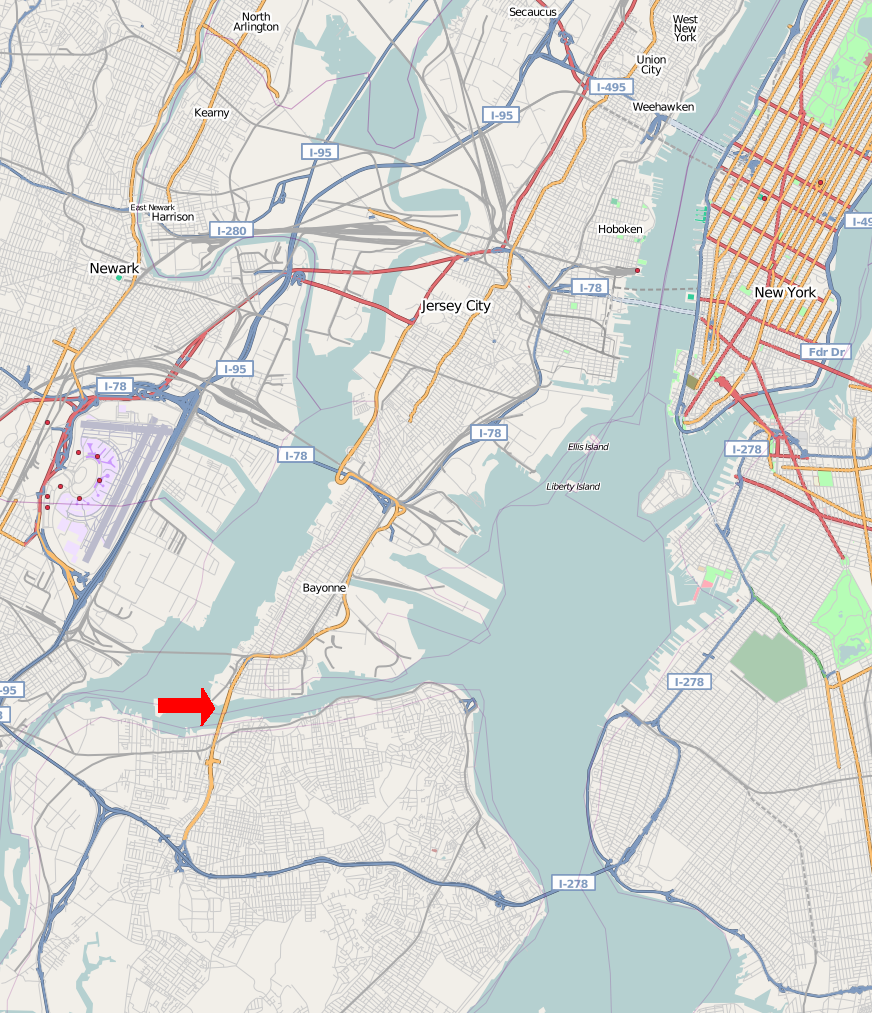
Newark Bay is entered by passing under the Bayonne Bridge

Newark Bay is rectangular, approximately 5.5 miles (8.9 km) long, varying in width from 0.6 to 1.2 miles (0.97 to 1.93 km). It is enclosed on the west by the cities of Newark and Elizabeth, and on the east by Jersey City and Bayonne. At the south is Staten Island, New York and at the north Kearny Point and Droyer's Point mark the mouth of the Hackensack. Shooters Island is a bird sanctuary where the borders of Staten Island, Bayonne and Elizabeth meet at one point. The southern tip of Bergen Neck, known as Bergen Point, juts into the bay and lent its name to the former Bergen Point Lighthouse. Built offshore in 1849 it was demolished and replaced with a skeletal tower in the mid 20th century.

The Atlantic Ocean at Sandy Hook and Rockaway Point is approximately 11 miles (18 km) away and reached by tidal straits dredged to maintain shipping lanes. Newark Bay is connected to Upper New York Bay by the Kill Van Kull and to Raritan Bay by the Arthur Kill. The names of the channels reflect the period of Dutch colonialization. The area around the bay was called Achter Kol, which translates as behind or beyond the ridge and refers to Bergen Hill. The emergence of the Hudson Palisades begins on Bergen Neck, the peninsula between the bay and the Hudson River. Kill in Dutch means stream or channel. During the British colonial era the bay was known as Cull bay. Kill van Kull literally translates as channel from the ridge. Arthur Kill is an anglicization of achter kill meaning back channel, which would speak to its location behind Staten Island.

Many of the maritime and distribution facilities along the bay are part of Foreign Trade Zone 49.

== Bridges ==
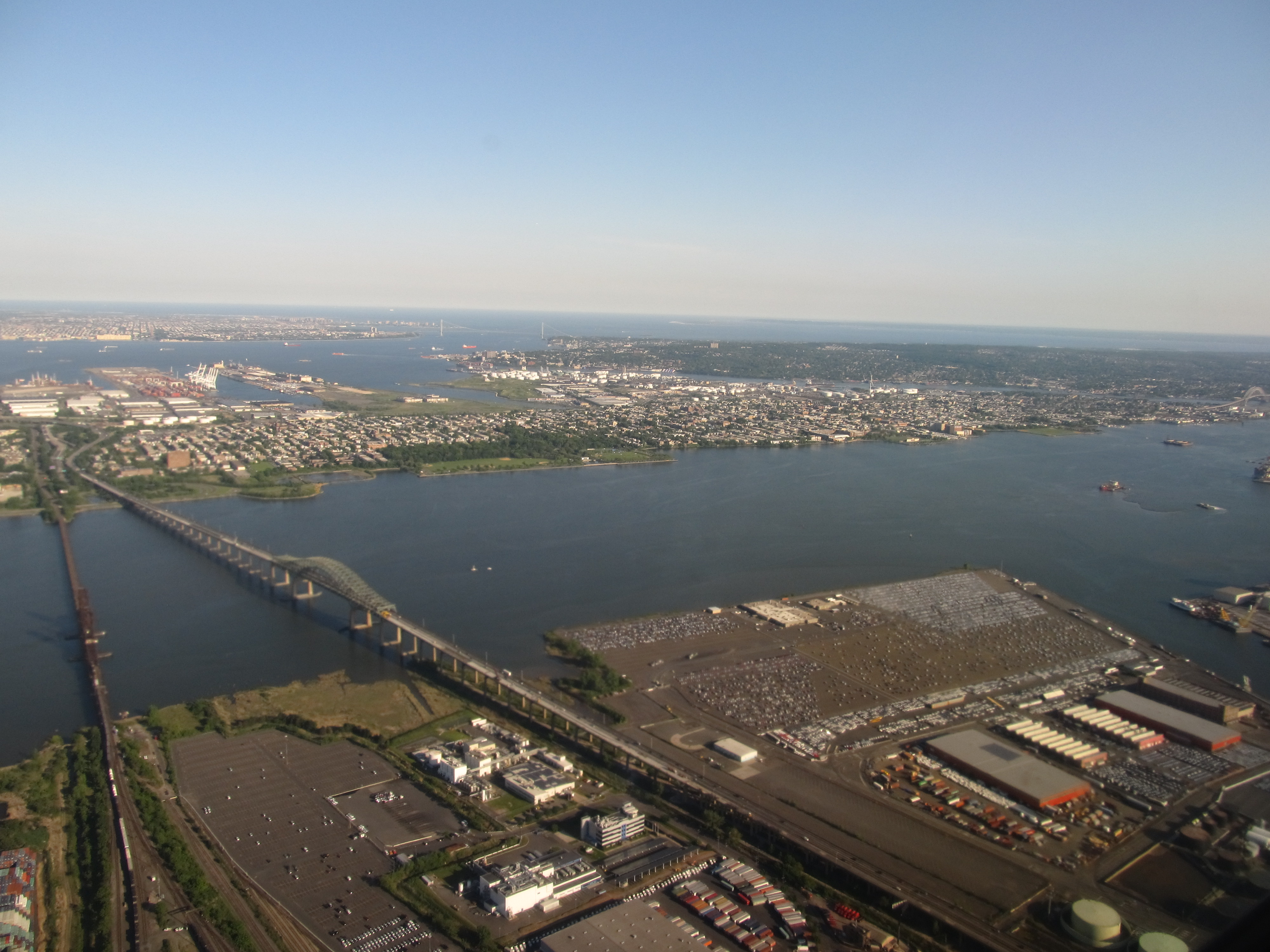
Upper Bay Bridge and Newark Bay Bridge. New Jersey Turnpike and Interstate 78. Oak Island Yard and Port Newark in foreground with Bayonne and Staten Island seen in the distance.

The bay is spanned by the Vincent R. Casciano Memorial Bridge which carries the Newark Bay Extension (Interstate 78) of the New Jersey Turnpike. The Upper Bay Bridge is a vertical-lift bridge north of the Casciano that is now used by CSX Transportation for freight shipment, including the notable Juice Train. Central Railroad of New Jersey's Newark Bay Bridge crossed the bay from 1864 to connect its Communipaw Terminal. Last used in 1978, it was determined to be a hazard to maritime navigation and demolished in the 1980s.

== Shoreline ==
=== Elizabethport to the Ironbound ===
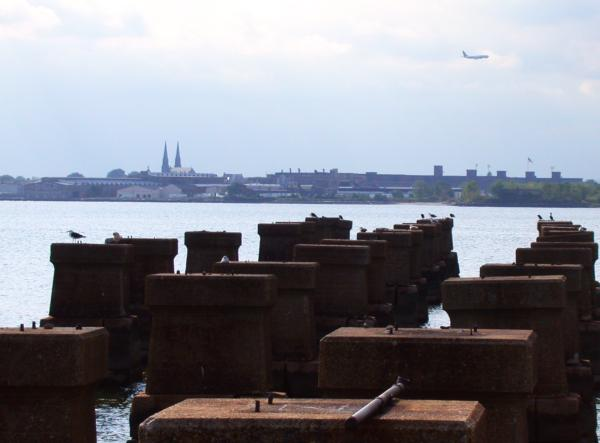
The CRRNJ Newark Bay Bridge, demolished in the 1980s, crossed to Elizabethport, seen in the distance.

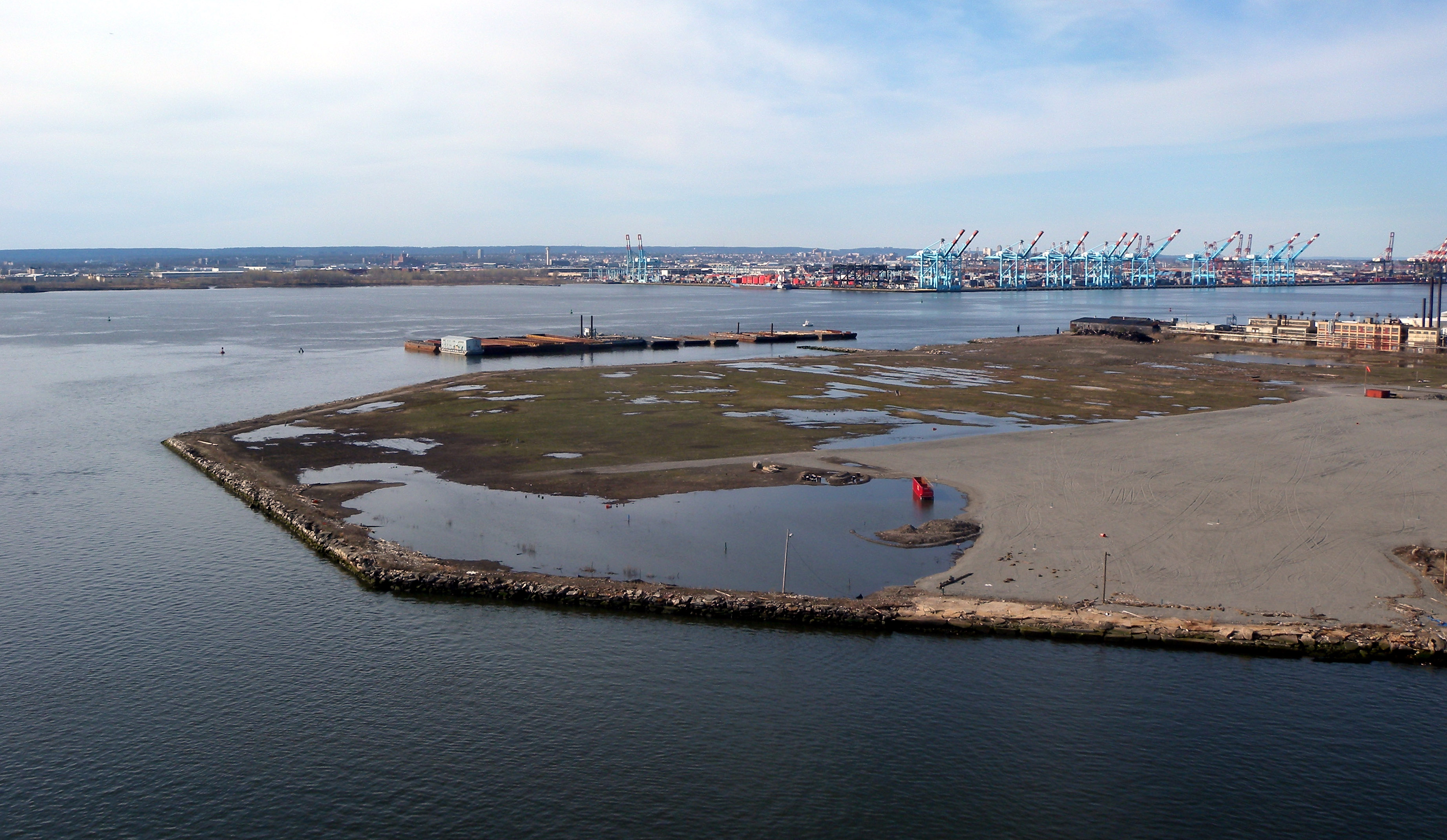
Bergen Point looking northwest to Elizabeth Marine Terminal

Elizabeth is the site of the first English speaking European settlement (1675) in New Jersey, its port at the southern end of the bay a major maritime hub during the colonial era. Jersey Gardens, an outlet mall, has been located north of Elizabethport since 1999. There are plans to construct a mixed used community adjacent to it along the bay.

The western edge of Newark Bay was originally shallow tidal wetlands covering approximately 12 square miles (31 km^{2}). In the 1910s, the city of Newark began excavating an angled shipping channel in the northeastern quadrant of the wetland which formed the basis of Port Newark. Work on the channel and terminal facilities on its north side accelerated during World War I, when the federal government took control of Port Newark. During the war there were close to 25,000 troops stationed at the Newark Bay Shipyard.

The city decided to expand the port at the end of the war. The Port Authority of New York and New Jersey was formed in 1921 and the Newark Bay Channels were authorized by the Rivers and Harbors Acts in 1922. Shipping operations languished after the war, and in 1927, the City of Newark started construction of Newark Liberty International Airport on the northwest quadrant of the wetlands which lay between Port Newark and the edge of the developed city. Port Authority took over the operations of Port Newark and the Newark Airport in 1948 and began modernizing and expanding both facilities southward. In 1958, the Port Authority dredged another shipping channel which straightened the course of Bound Brook, the tidal inlet forming the boundary between Newark and Elizabeth. Dredged materials was used to create new upland south of the new Elizabeth Channel, where the Port Authority constructed the Elizabeth Marine Terminal. The first shipping facility to open upon the Elizabeth Channel was the new 90-acre (36 ha) Sea-Land Container Terminal, which was the prototype for virtually every other container terminal constructed thereafter.

The Ironbound is an industrial area along the bay which becomes residential farther inland near Downtown Newark.

=== Kearny Point ===
The Newark and New York Railroad, controlled by the Central Railroad of New Jersey, first built the Newark and New York Branch across the rivers and tip of New Barbadoes Neck in 1869. One bridge was taken out of service in 1946 after a ship collided into it. Passenger service on the other bridge, the PD Draw, was discontinued in 1967. The Kearny Point peninsula is site of the River Terminal, a massive distribution facility. It comprises the former Western Electric Kearny Works and Federal Shipbuilding and Drydock Company, the shipyards of which operated from 1917 to 1949, and played a prominent role in both World War I and World War II.

=== Bergen Point to Droyer's Point ===
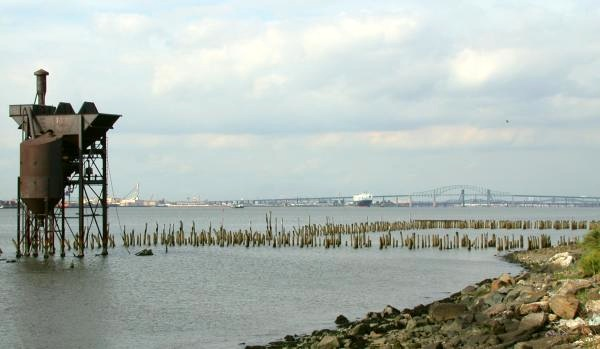
The shoreline at Bayonne

While there was some maritime development on the eastern banks of the bay closer Bergen Point most of the eastern shore abuts residential and recreational areas. The Hackensack RiverWalk is a partially completed linear park greenway intended to link the string of parks along its banks and that of the Hackensack River from the Bayonne Bridge to the Hackensack Meadowlands in Secaucus and North Bergen. In Bayonne, much of the bay has not seen bulkhead development, and hence has a natural shoreline. The city's largest parks are its shores. At Droyer's Point recreational and residential development have included a promenade.

=== Howland Hook ===
The Howland Hook Marine Terminal is a container port facility located at the northwestern corner of Staten Island at the entrance to the Arthur Kill. Nearby is Port Ivory, named for the Ivory Soap plant once located there. To the east is the residential neighborhood of Mariners Harbor which overlooks the bay. In the first half of the 20th century, Bethlehem Steel maintained a plant which built military transports during World War I and World War II. Currently, tugboat companies and number of smaller dry docks operate along the shore.

== Pollution and marine life ==
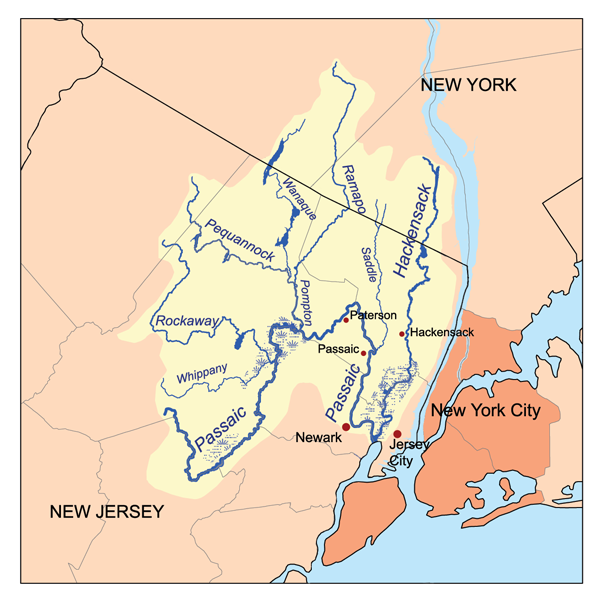
The watershed which drains into the bay

The bay is notoriously polluted, and it is now a Superfund site. "One blue crab in Newark Bay has enough dioxin to give somebody cancer," said David Pringle, spokesman for Clean Water Action.

Both the tributaries, particularly the Passaic River, have sections which are lined with heavy industry. Some industrial facilities discharged wastes into the tributaries during the nineteenth and twentieth centuries, prior to passage of the 1972 Clean Water Act. High levels of PCBs and dioxin have been detected in the bay. It also has high levels of mercury, copper and other toxic chemicals.

While illegal discharges of chemical waste have been stopped, crabbing is illegal and fishing is limited due to chemicals that remain in the sediment.

Pronounced endocrine disruption and reproductive effects have been reported in Newark Bay Mummichog, often used as a sentinel and bioindicator species. Reproductive effects reported are primarily due to a chemical inhibition of vitellogenesis and oogenesis, which are highly conserved processes for oviparous (egg-laying) animals. Killifish within Newark Bay have also been reported to chemically adapt (desensitize) to aryl hydrocarbon receptor mediated pollutants (i.e. dioxins). Killifish within Newark Bay have emerged as a popular tool for studying population effects of historical and emerging chemicals of concern due to their chronic exposure to complex mixtures of common contaminants, and subsequent effects due to living within a polluted environment.

=== 2008 Liberian freighter collision ===
In January 2008, a 117 ft. Great Lakes Dredge and Dock Company dredge in Newark Bay was struck by a 669-ft Liberian-flagged orange juice freighter named the Orange Sun. Newark Bay had to be closed for five hours by the U.S. Coast Guard until damages to the GLD&D dredge were mitigated. The dredge had begun to take on water and a diving crew was sent in order to make repairs. In December 2009, the National Transportation Safety Board issued a report that blamed the Orange Sun for the accident. The Orange Sun's master had not informed the captain or crew about the ship's tendency to deviate from its course.

== See also ==
- Geography of New York–New Jersey Harbor Estuary
- List of bridges, tunnels, and cuts in Hudson County, New Jersey
- Marine life of New York-New Jersey Harbor Estuary
- Newark Bay rail accident
- Timeline of Jersey City area railroads
