= Newark and New York Branch =

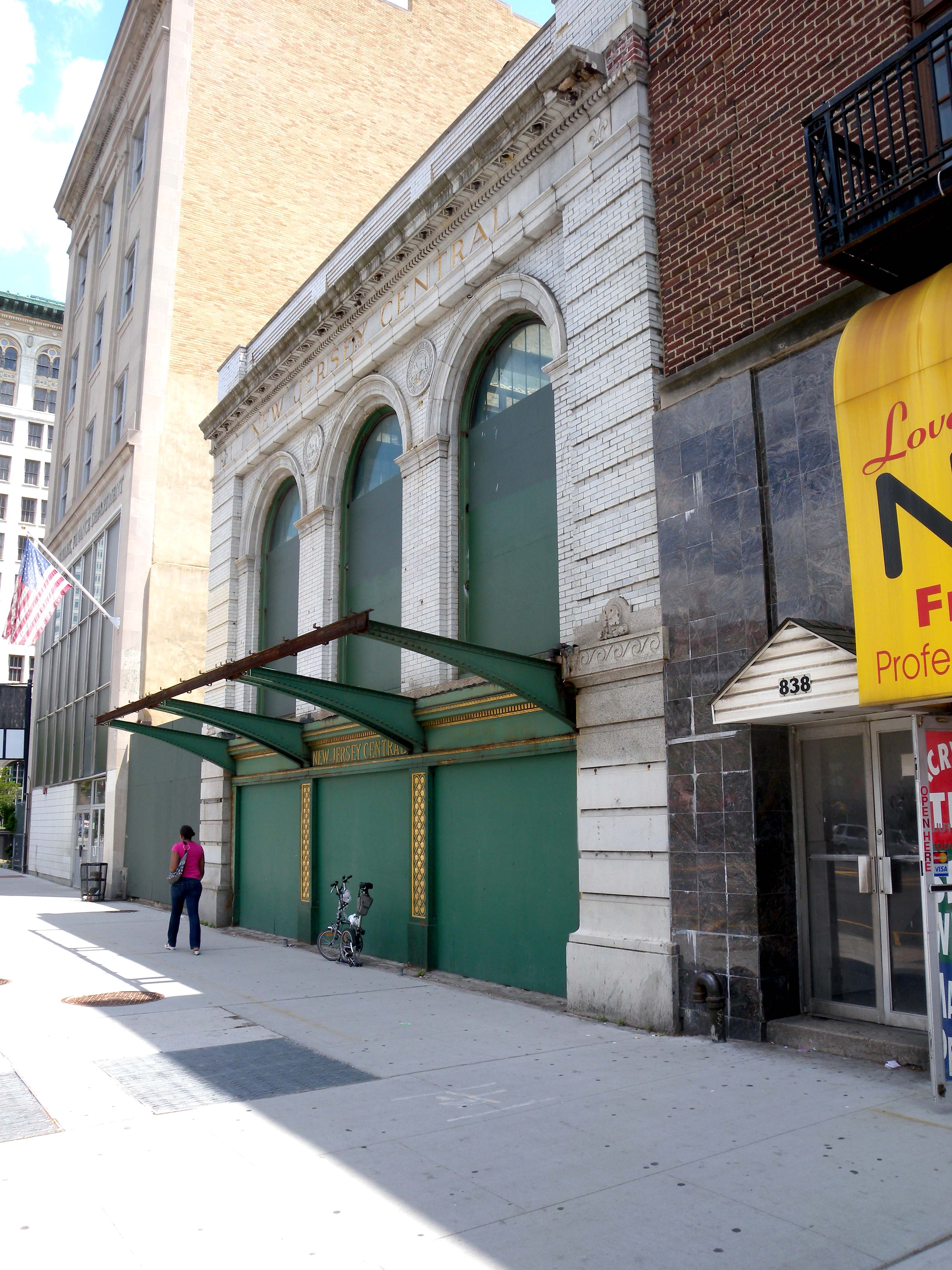
- The façade of the Central Railroad of New Jersey Terminal near Four Corners in Downtown Newark

Technical
- Track gauge: 1,435 mm (4 ft 8 1/2 in) standard gauge

The Newark and New York Branch was a railway line that ran between Downtown Newark and the Communipaw Terminal at the mouth of the North River (Hudson River) in Jersey City, bridging the Hackensack River and Passaic River just north of their mouths at the Newark Bay in northeastern New Jersey. The Central Railroad of New Jersey operated it from its opening in 1869. Through operations ended in 1946; portions remained in use until 1967.

== History ==
Opened on July 23, 1869 and operated by the Central Railroad of New Jersey (CNJ), the railroad provided a direct route between Newark and its Jersey City terminal, where passengers could transfer to ferries to New York. The line cost $300,000 per mile, unprecedented at the time, earning it the sobriquet "the country's costliest railroad". In 1872 a connection south was added at a junction called Newark Transfer to Elizabeth, where it joined the railroad's main line, which crossed Newark Bay at Bayonne on the predecessor of the CRRNJ Newark Bay Bridge. The line was built partially to relieve overcrowding and reduce the travel time taken on the New Jersey Railroad line to Exchange Place on the Hudson River waterfront.

The route travelled west from the Hudson and crossed Bergen Hill where a cut had been excavated for a right of way (ROW). It then crossed the Hackensack to Kearny Point, the tip of a larger peninsula formally known as New Barbadoes Neck, to the Passaic River. The bridges across the rivers were raised in 1913 to accommodate shipping. Upon crossing the Passaic River, it entered the Ironbound Section of Newark at Ferry and St. Francis Streets, traveling parallel to and south of Market Street until it crossed Ferry Street again between Union and Prospect Streets. From there, the line crossed over the Pennsylvania Railroad (PRR) tracks and terminated at Broad Street. At its peak over 100 passenger trains used the route daily.

After a boat collided with the Hackensack Drawbridge in 1946 causing severe damage, the through line was discontinued, and the bridge was dismantled. Passenger trains from both Newark and Elizabethport continued utilizing the PD Draw over the Passaic to Kearny to serve a Western Electric plant on Kearny Point until the Aldene Plan was implemented in 1967.

The piers of the Hackensack bridge are still visible (at 40.718709°N 74.103985°W) from the shoreline along the proposed Hackensack River Greenway. Several open-deck spans of the Passaic River swing bridge, and its main pier (though not the swing span itself), remain (at 40.72299°N 74.121346°W). While the Newark terminal building is still standing and is part of the Four Corners Historic District the trackage and train shed which served it are now the site of the Prudential Center. The rail yard is site of Mulberry Commons. The bridges from the yard over McCarter Highway, the PRR tracks now used by Amtrak/New Jersey Transit (NJT) to Newark Penn Station, and New Jersey Railroad Avenue still exist. The right of way through the Ironbound was developed as commercial space and housing. A station house at the Jackson Avenue station survived until at least 2007.

The ROW through Bergen Hill and West Side in Jersey City has become part of the Hudson Bergen Light Rail. NJT has announced plans for 0.7 mile extension of the West Side Branch from its current terminus at West Side Avenue station over Route 440 to a redevelopment area known as Bayfront, where a new station would be constructed.

== Service ==
City	Station	Distance (Note: Measured in miles from Newark Broad Street)	Service Began	Service Ended	Status
New York City	Liberty Street	N/A			location filled as part of Battery Park City; Service provided by NY Waterway at BPC Ferry Terminal
New York City	West 23rd Street	N/A			Pier 63 at Hudson River Park
North River (Hudson River)
Jersey City	Central Railroad of New Jersey Terminal	7.48	1864	April 30, 1967	Partially preserved in Liberty State Park
Jersey City	Communipaw	6.23			Liberty State Park (HBLR station) is just to the north of the former station
Jersey City	Pacific Avenue	5.82			
Jersey City	Arlington Avenue	5.50			Garfield Avenue (HBLR station)
Jersey City	Jackson Avenue	5.17		1948	Martin Luther King Drive (HBLR station)
Jersey City	West Side Avenue	4.65			West Side Avenue (HBLR station)
Jersey City	Bayfront is a planned Hudson Bergen Light Rail station along the right of way on the West Side				
Hackensack River-Hackensack Drawbridge
Kearny	Kearny	3.31			
Passaic River-PD Draw
Newark	Newark Transfer	2.53	December 21, 1913	April 30, 1967	Chemical Coast freight only
Newark	East Ferry Street Station	1.30	1869	1951	Trackage and stations removed
Newark	Ferry Street	0.57	1869	April 30, 1967	Trackage and stations removed
Newark	Newark Broad Street; 40°44′1″N 74°10′16″W	0.0	July 23, 1869	April 30, 1967	Terminal building standing and trackage removed Now the site of the Prudential Center and Mulberry Commons Park

== See also ==
- Newark Plank Road
- Timeline of Jersey City area railroads
- List of stations on the Central Railroad of New Jersey
- List of bridges, tunnels, and cuts in Hudson County, New Jersey
- List of ferries across the Hudson River to New York City
- Park Place (H&M station)
