= West Side Avenue station =

Light rail station in New Jersey, US

West Side Avenue
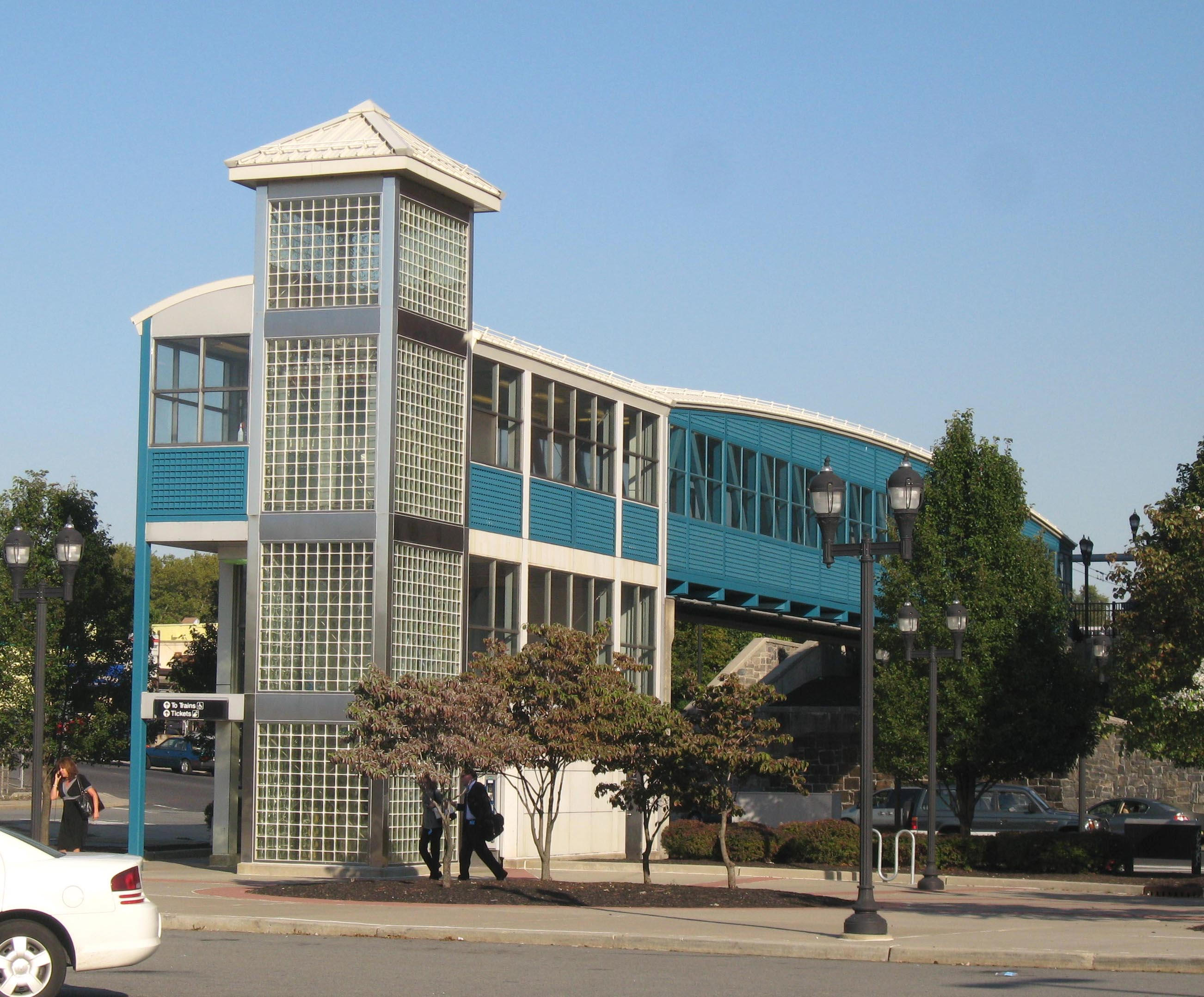
- West Side Avenue station elevator and bridge as seen from park and ride lot

General information
- Location: West Side Avenue & Claremont Avenue; Jersey City, New Jersey
- Coordinates: 40°42′53″N 74°05′14″W
- Owner: New Jersey Transit
- Platforms: 1 island platform 2 side platforms
- Tracks: 2
- Connections: NJ Transit Bus: 9, 14, 80, 80S

Construction
- Parking: 804 spaces, 18 accessible spaces
- Cycle facilities: Yes
- Accessible: Yes

Other information
- Fare zone: 1

History
- Opened: April 15, 2000

Passengers
- 2025: 2,432(average weekday)
- Rank: 7 of 24

Services
Preceding station	NJ Transit	Following station
Terminus	West Side–Tonnelle	Martin Luther King Drive toward Tonnelle Avenue
Former services
Preceding station	Central Railroad of New Jersey	Following station
Kearny toward Newark Broad Street	Newark and New York Branch	Jackson Avenue toward Jersey City
Location

West Side Avenue station is a station on the Hudson–Bergen Light Rail (HBLR) in the West Side neighborhood in Jersey City, New Jersey. Located on the east side of West Side Avenue, the station is the terminal of the West Side Avenue branch of the Hudson–Bergen Light Rail, with service to Tonnelle Avenue station in North Bergen. The station consists of a single island platform and a pair of tracks that end at the station. The station contains a pedestrian bridge over West Side Avenue to a small parking lot and bus stop on the west side of the street. The station is accessible to people with disabilities, with an elevator in the pedestrian overpass and train-level platforms. West Side Avenue station opened on April 15, 2000 as part of the original operating segment of the Hudson–Bergen Light Rail.

== History ==
West Side Avenue station is located on the site of a station with the same name used by the Central Railroad of New Jersey. The original station was established in 1869 as part of the Newark and New York Railroad at the crossing for Mallory Avenue (Hudson County Route 611). The stop, known as West Bergen was moved in the late 1870s to West Side Avenue. A two-story wooden depot was built at West Side Avenue c. 1888 and an eastbound brick station measuring 15 by 40 feet (4.6 m × 12.2 m) came in 1910. Service at West Side Avenue, which went to Broad Street station in Newark became truncated on February 3, 1946 when a steamship collided with the bridge over the Hackensack River, eliminating two spans. The station lost passenger service on May 6, 1948 when service on the branch ended.

The new station opened on April 15, 2000.

After two years of studies, in May 2011, NJT announced its plan for a 0.7-mile (1.1 km) extension of the line. The new track would be laid along an elevated viaduct from the West Side Avenue station, across Route 440 to the northern end of the proposed Bayfront redevelopment area, where a new station would be constructed. The trip between the two stations would take 1 minute and 50 seconds. The project, eligible for federal funding, is estimated to cost at $171.6 million. In December 2017, NJ Transit approved a $5 million preliminary engineering contract for the extension project.

In early 2019, it was announced that the West Side Avenue, Martin Luther King Drive, and Garfield Avenue stations on the West Side Branch would close for nine months starting in June 2019 for repairs to a sewer line running along the right-of-way. During that time, replacement service was provided by NJ Transit shuttle buses. Service to the station was restored on May 23, 2020.

== Station layout ==
The station is on an embankment above the east side of street, and consists of an island platform and two tracks. Bumper blocks are at the west end of the station while the platform continues with a pedestrian bridge and elevator connecting it to a large park and ride lot and bus station. It is built along the former Central Railroad of New Jersey's Newark and New York Branch right of way that continued west across Newark Bay.

== Vicinity ==
- New Jersey City University
- Droyer's Point
- Bayfront
- Greenville, Jersey City
- St. Mark Coptic Orthodox Church
- Henry Snyder High School
- A. Harry Moore School*
- Jersey City Board of Education

== Bibliography ==
- Bernhart, Benjamin L. (2004). Historic Journeys By Rail: Central Railroad of New Jersey Stations, Structures & Marine Equipment. Outer Station Project. ISBN 1-891402-07-2.
- Urquhart, Frank J. (2017). A History of the city of Newark, New Jersey, Volume 1. Altenmünster, Germany: Jazzybee Verlag Jürgen Beck. ISBN 978-3-8496-4990-6.
