= Hackensack Drawbridge =

- Coordinates: 40°43′7.35″N 74°6′14.35″W
- Carried: Newark and New York Branch
- Crossed: Hackensack River
- Locale: Jersey City and Kearny
- Other name(s): HD Draw
- Owner: Central Railroad of New Jersey

Characteristics
- Design: swing bridge
- Material: Steel
- Height: 75 feet (23 m)

History
- Opened: 1869
- Collapsed: 1946

The Hackensack Drawbridge (also known as the HD Draw) was a double-track railroad movable bridge across the mouth of the Hackensack River between Jersey City and Kearny, New Jersey. It was operational until 1946, when a steamship crashed into it.

Built and maintained by the Central Railroad of New Jersey (CNJ), the bridge was part of the Newark and New York Branch, a rail line characterized as the "costliest railroad" by W. H. Schmidt Jr., a columnist for Trains. Opened on July 23, 1869, the line was routed between terminals at Newark and Jersey City, where passengers could transfer to ferries to New York. It also crossed the Passaic River and the Kearny Point peninsula. Freight cars regularly traversed the bridge to deliver to various industries in Harrison.

== Description ==
From the west side of the rail via tunnel, four tracks converged into three, and then into two tracks to pass over the Hackensack Drawbridge. By 1913 the rail line, including the bridges across the rivers, was raised about 30 feet (9.1 m) to avoid conflicts with maritime traffic in the newly developing port The draw span of the PD Draw over the Passaic had been relocated 185 feet (56 m) upstream to create another bridge on a new alignment in 1912. By 1922, plans were made to improve the drawbridge's railway signal layout, increasing the number of interlocking levers, ground signals and bridge signals. The drawbridge tower employed three levermen.

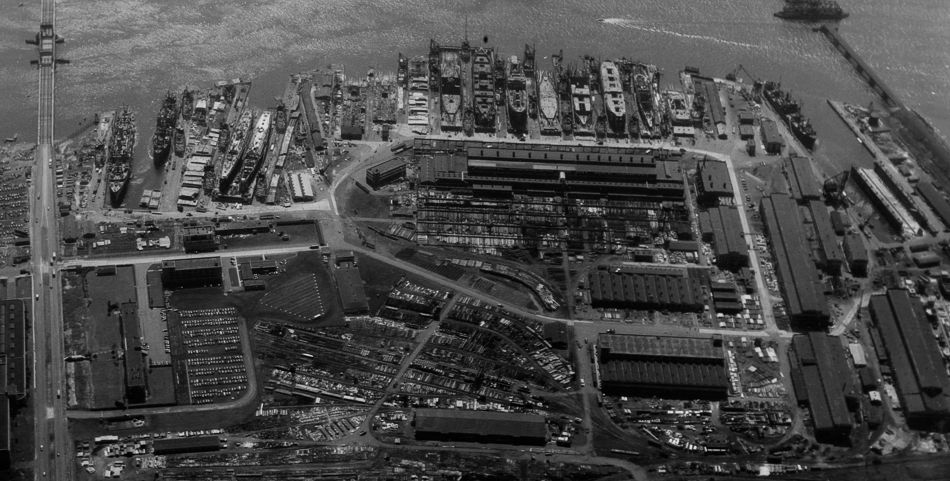
The bridge was south (upper right) of Federal Shipbuilding and Drydock Company. The Lincoln Highway Bridge was to the north (upper left)

In 1897, a train carrying nearly 200 people derailed while crossing the bridge; there were no injuries. In 1940, the Port of New York Authority (now Port Authority of New York and New Jersey) cited the bridge as a navigational menace and called for its replacement. With war impending, the War Department in 1941 asked CNJ to replace the swing bridge with a vertical lift to afford better access to the Federal Shipbuilding and Drydock Company on Kearny Point. Plans were made, but the shortage of steel prevented the project from being constructed.

== Steamship collision ==
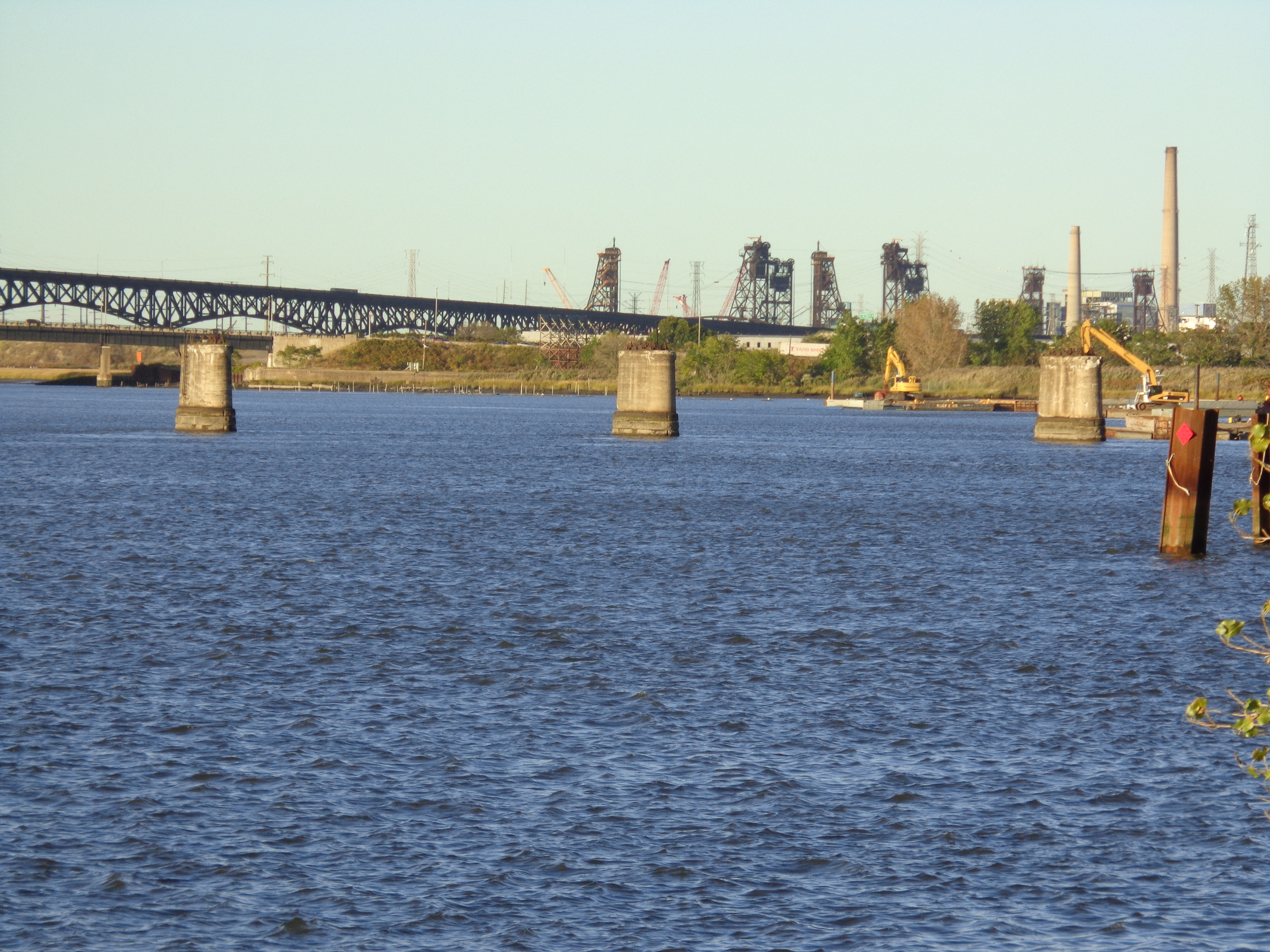
Piers (foreground) remain in the Hackensack as seen in shot looking north

On February 3, 1946, SS Jagger Seam, a collier, crashed into the drawbridge, shearing off two of the bridge's spans. The collision was the result of a mix-up in signals between the collier and a tug. It was later determined that mishandling on the part of the Jagger Seam was the cause of the accident. Initial estimates indicated that rail service over the Hackensack would be delayed for three months, with the CNJ projecting that it would take that long to procure enough steel to reconstruct the bridge. After the accident, trains continued to run from Kearny to Newark. Similarly, service east of the drawbridge continued to run between the West Side Avenue station and Communipaw Terminal.

In October 1946, the CNJ asked the Interstate Commerce Commission (ICC) for permission to abandon the line. Without any further funding for repair of the Hackensack Drawbridge and with the route severed in two, the railroad was deemed "half-abandoned". The ICC sympathized with the CNJ, saying "'twas a pity". While the Newark Branch operated until 1967, service in Jersey City was discontinued. Ultimately, the bridge was dismantled, but remains of its piers are still visible in the Hackensack River.

== See also ==
- Timeline of Jersey City area railroads
- List of bridges, tunnels, and cuts in Hudson County, New Jersey
- List of crossings of the Hackensack River

== Sources ==
- Federal supplement. Vol. 99. West Pub. Co. 1952.
- French, Kenneth (2002). Railroads of Hoboken and Jersey City. Arcadia Publishing. p. 128. ISBN 9780738509662.
- Railway age. Vol. 120. Simmons-Boardman. 1946.
- Railway signaling and communications. Vol. 15. Simmons-Boardman Pub. Corp. 1922. OCLC 1604369.
- Schmidt Jr., W. H. (1949). ""Costliest Railroad," now half abandoned". Trains. Vol. 9. Kalmbach Publishing Company.
