= National Newark Building =

Skyscraper in Newark, New Jersey, US

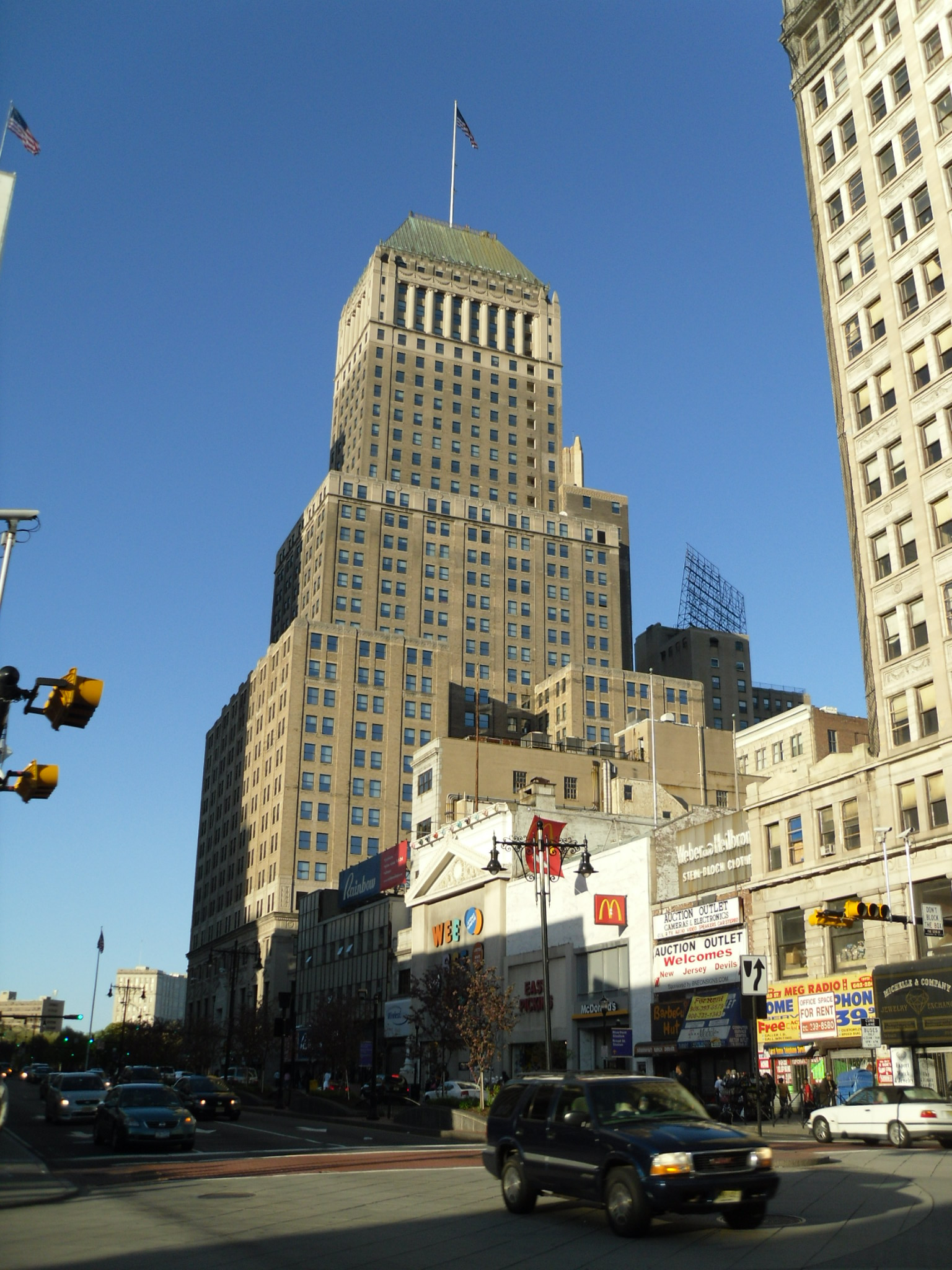
- Interactive map of the National Newark Building area
- Former names: National Newark and Essex Bank Building

Record height
- Tallest in New Jersey from 1931 to 1989^{[I]}
- Preceded by: Eleven 80
- Surpassed by: Exchange Place Center

General information
- Status: Completed
- Location: 744 Broad Street, Newark, New Jersey
- Coordinates: 40.736653°N 74.171032°W
- Construction started: 1930
- Completed: 1933

Height
- Roof: 142 m (466 ft)

Technical details
- Floor count: 35
- Floor area: 639,990 sq ft (59,457 m^{2})
- Lifts/elevators: 16

Design and construction
- Architect: John H. & Wilson C. Ely

The National Newark Building (Formerly the National Newark and Essex Bank Building) is a neo-classical office skyscraper in Newark, New Jersey, United States. It has been the tallest building in Newark since 1931 and was tallest in New Jersey until 1989. At thirty-five stories, it has a height of 466 ft (142 m). It is located in the heart of Downtown Newark at 744 Broad Street, just north of Four Corners.

The building was designed by the father and son architectural firm, John H. & Wilson C. Ely, which also designed Newark City Hall and the American Insurance Company Building. The exterior is chiefly tan brick and limestone. The top of the building is inspired by the Mausoleum at Halicarnassus, one of the Seven Wonders of the World. The ten mezzanine murals by J. Monroe Hewlett and Charles Gulbrandsen depict the growth of commerce in Newark.

It underwent a $68 million renovation which was completed in 2002. The new reinforced steel pole rises 113 ft (34 m) above the roof line, elevating the overall height of the building and pole to 578 ft (176 m).

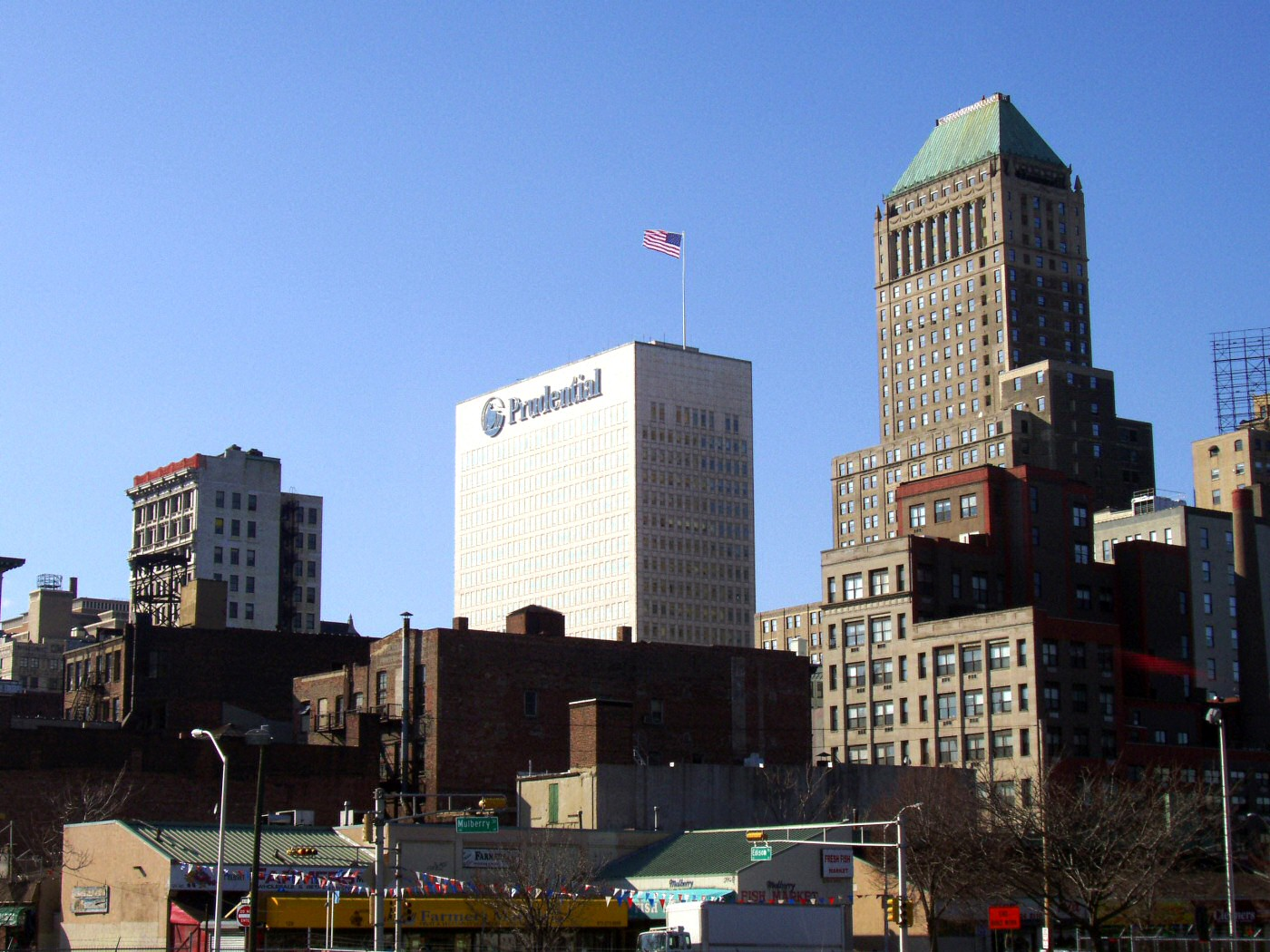
From left: Home Office Building, Prudential Headquarters, and National Newark

== See also ==
- List of tallest buildings in Newark
- List of tallest buildings in New Jersey
