= American Insurance Company Building =

Skyscraper in Newark, Essex County, New Jersey, United States

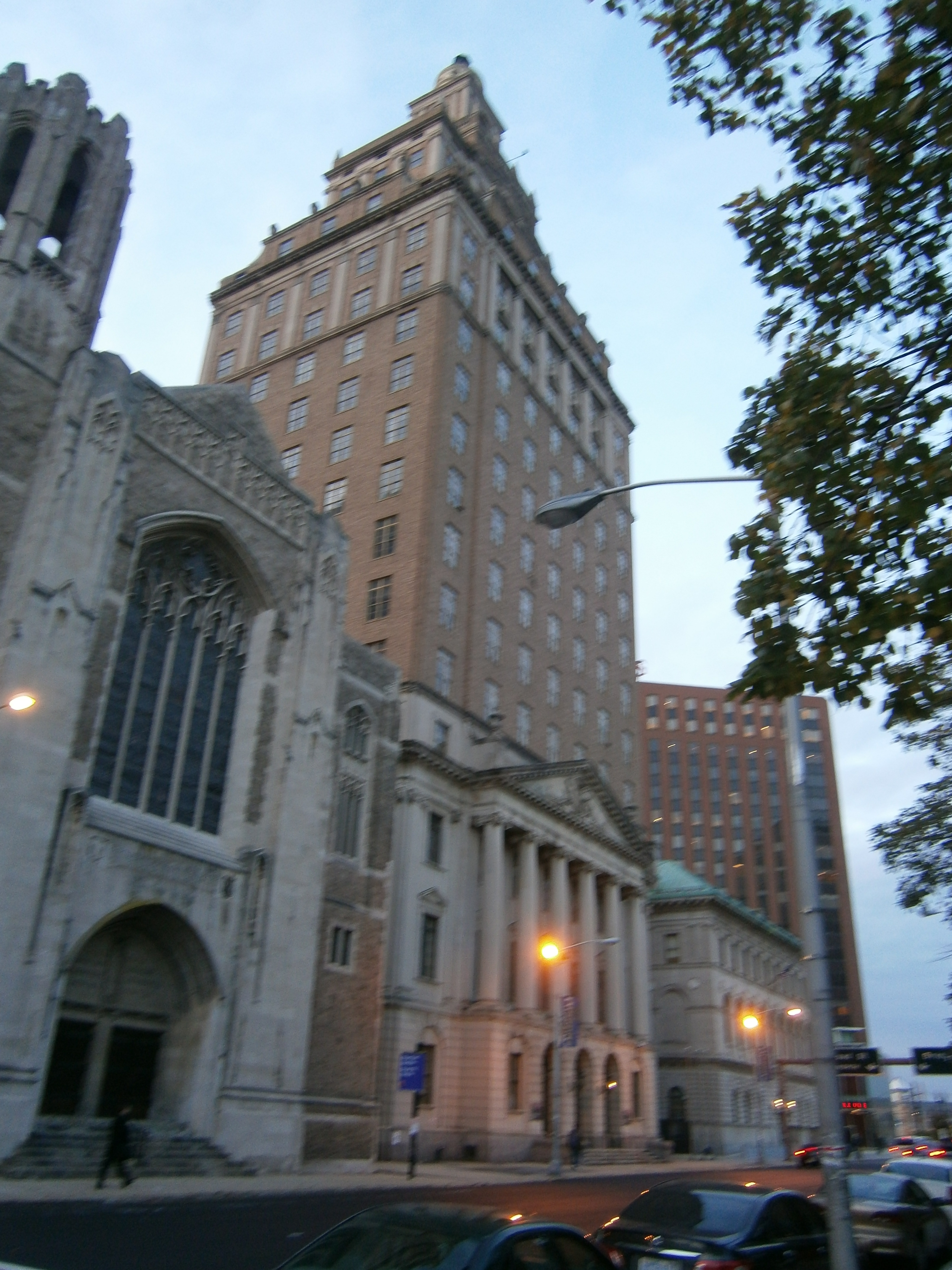
- Interactive map of the American Insurance Company Building area

General information
- Coordinates: 40.74459°N 74.17067°W
- Completed: 1930
- Owner: Rutgers University -Newark

Height
- Roof: 326 ft (99 m)

Technical details
- Floor count: 16
- Lifts/elevators: 9

Design and construction
- Architect: John H. & Wilson C. Ely

References
- James Street Commons Historic District
- U.S. National Register of Historic Places
- U.S. Historic district – Contributing property
- New Jersey Register of Historic Places
- Location within Essex County, New Jersey Location within New Jersey Location within the United States
- Coordinates: 40.74459°N 74.17067°W
- NRHP reference No.: 78001758
- NJRHP No.: 1275

Significant dates
- Added to NRHP: January 9, 1978
- Designated NJRHP: February 10, 1977

The American Insurance Company Building is one of the oldest and tallest skyscrapers in Newark, Essex County, New Jersey, United States. Located at 15 Washington Street on Washington Park it was once headquarters for the American Insurance Company and is now part of Rutgers University. The neo-classical tower is a contributing property to the James Street Commons Historic District which also encompasses Washington Park, Newark Museum, and Newark Public Library. It re-opened in November 2015 as student dorms, event space, and chancellor's apartment. In 2023 it was renamed in honor of Ruth Bader Ginsburg.

== American Insurance Company ==
Newark has been a center for the insurance industry since the early 19th century and has been home to Firemen's Insurance Company and Mutual Benefit Life. The Prudential Insurance headquarters are prominent buildings within the Four Corners Historic District.

The American Insurance Company was incorporated February 20, 1846, and commenced business on April 1, 1846. The company maintained offices downtown on Broad Street and later Park Place. A new home office was completed in 1930. The sixteen story neo-classical tower is 326 ft (99 m) tall. A main interior feature is a "great hall" with 20 ft (6.1 m) ceilings and 15 ft (4.6 m) windows. The building was designed by the father and son architectural firm, John H. & Wilson C. Ely, which also designed the National Newark Building and Newark City Hall.

The American Insurance Company later became the American Insurance Group. The company was acquired by the Fireman's Fund Insurance Company in 1963 the combined company for a time known as the Fireman's Fund American Insurance Group.

== Rutgers University ==
=== SI Newhouse Center for Law and Justice ===
In 1977 the Fireman's Fund Insurance Company announced it would be moving its corporate headquarters from downtown Newark to a new campus in suburban Morris Plains, N.J. The company donated its soon to be vacated building to Rutgers University.

After outgrowing facilities in several buildings in downtown the Rutgers School of Law in Newark consolidated into the skyscraper located near the main campus. It was named it in honor of Samuel Irving Newhouse, Sr., a 1916 graduate of the New Jersey Law School (a forerunner of the law school) and founder of Advance Publications and housed the SI Newhouse Center for Law and Justice from 1979 to 1999. after which time the building remained empty.

=== Graduate school housing ===
Rutgers originally intended to develop the building as a hotel, but the project fell through after September 11, 2001. In February 2012, the university announced that it planned to renovate the vacant structure for graduate student housing, citing the growing need and prime location near the campus and the Newark Broad Street Station. The project called for a conversion into a mixed-use complex with furnished studio apartments and one- to four-bedroom units for 350 students. It was expected to cost $71 million and serve as a catalyst for continued renaissance of downtown as a residential as well as commercial community. The project was financed through grants, tax credits, and bond issues. Renovations were expected to begin in 2014 and be completed in 2015. and to include public performance spaces and a penthouse for the school's chancellor.

== See also ==
- List of tallest buildings in Newark
- Washington Park (NLR station)
- One Riverview
