= One Theater Square =

Mixed-use building in Newark, New Jersey

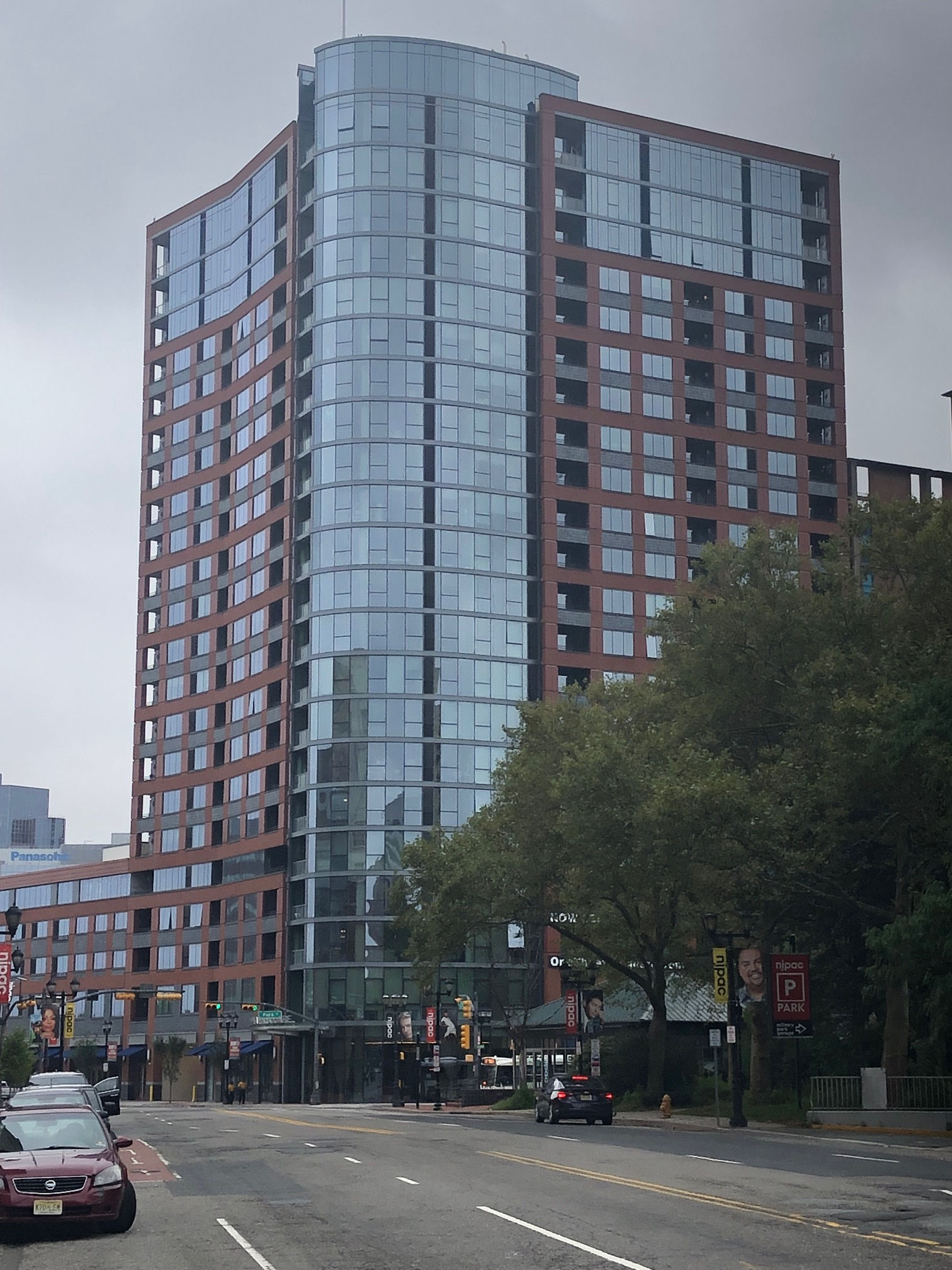

General information
- Type: mixed use (luxury residential high rise apartments and ground level retail space)
- Location: 2 Center Street; Newark, New Jersey
- Coordinates: 40°44′22″N 74°10′05″W
- Construction started: November 2016
- Completed: Late 2018
- Opening: Late 2018
- Cost: $116m

Height
- Roof: 283.23 ft (86.33 m)

Technical details
- Floor count: 22
- Lifts/elevators: 6

Design and construction
- Architect: BLT Architects
- Developer: Dranoff Properties, NJPAC
- Structural engineer: Harmon Engineering

One Theater Square is a mixed-use (residential and commercial) building in Newark, New Jersey. It is located across from Military Park and the New Jersey Performing Arts Center, which inspired its name. Completed in 2018, it includes the first newly-constructed high rise apartment building to be built in the city in more than fifty years. It was designed by BLT Architects.

== Concept and development ==
NJPAC was originally conceived to have additional real estate component, including two buildings at the site of One Theater Square. The project was proposed in 2005 by former NJPAC president and CEO Lawrence P. Goldman. NJPAC and Dranoff Properties of Philadelphia signed a Letter of Intent for the development of a mixed-use luxury residential and retail project in 2008. At the time, it was initially planned as a 28-story building with 30,000 square feet of retail space, 640 parking spaces and 250 rental apartments. By 2010, the idea grew into a $190 million project with a 44-story tower, 328 residential rental units, a pool and a spa. However, due to an economic downturn and consequential financial difficulties, the plan was changed again. That proposal would have built the tallest building in the city.

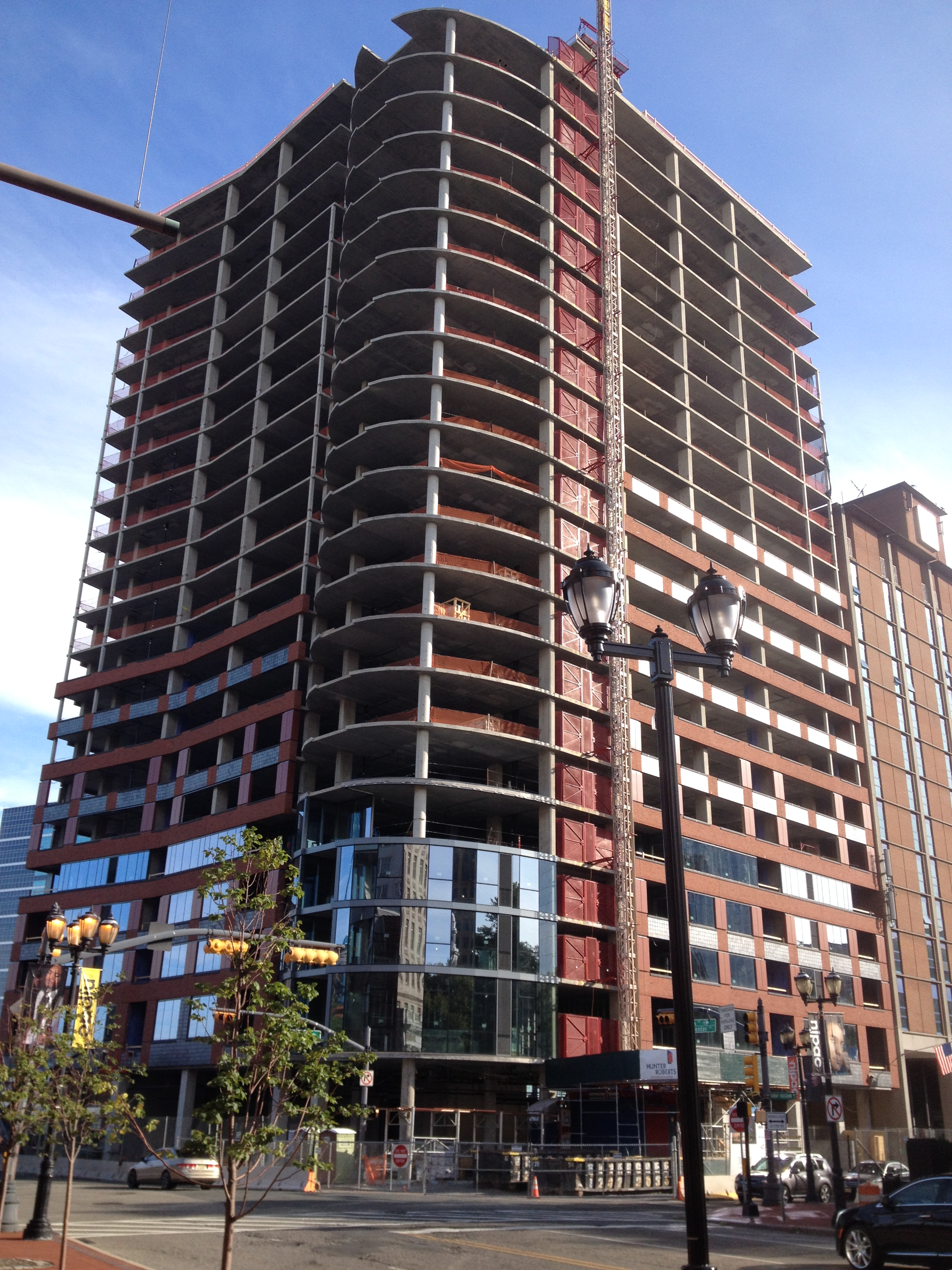
Topped-out in 2017

Eventually, the plan for the site of 1.2 acres (0.49 ha) called for 22 stories with 245 residential units, 24 of which will be affordable housing units marketed as artist residences; 12,000 square feet of street-level retail and cultural uses and structured parking for 285 cars to serve the shared needs of the residential community as well as those of NJPAC's audiences and daytime commercial demand. The estimated $116 million cost was offset by $38 million New Jersey Economic Development Authority Urban Transit tax credits and federal tax credits for inclusion of affordable housing for artists. The project had been long delayed and stood to lose tax credits by 2017 if investment in construction was not started. Construction broke ground in November 2016. and the project was completed in late 2018.

== Living Downtown ==
The project was conceived as part of a continued effort to increase the resident population in the heart of Downtown Newark. It is near the restored Eleven 80 at Raymond Boulevard, the Union Building, the former Hahne and Company flagship store, the New Jersey Bell Headquarters Building, and the American Insurance Company Building as well as the newly constructed 50 Rector Park. As of 2019, the Griffith Building, long proposed for redevelopment, remains vacant.

Newark Light Rail service opened as July 17, 2006, at the NJPAC/Center Street station, connecting the site with Broad Street Station and Penn Station Newark.

== See also ==
- 50 Rector Park
- List of tallest buildings in Newark
