= John H. & Wilson C. Ely =

American architectural firm

Practice information
- Founders: John H. Ely
- Founded: 1885; 140 years ago
- Dissolved: 1971; 54 years ago
- Location: Newark, New Jersey

Website
- hummelarch.com

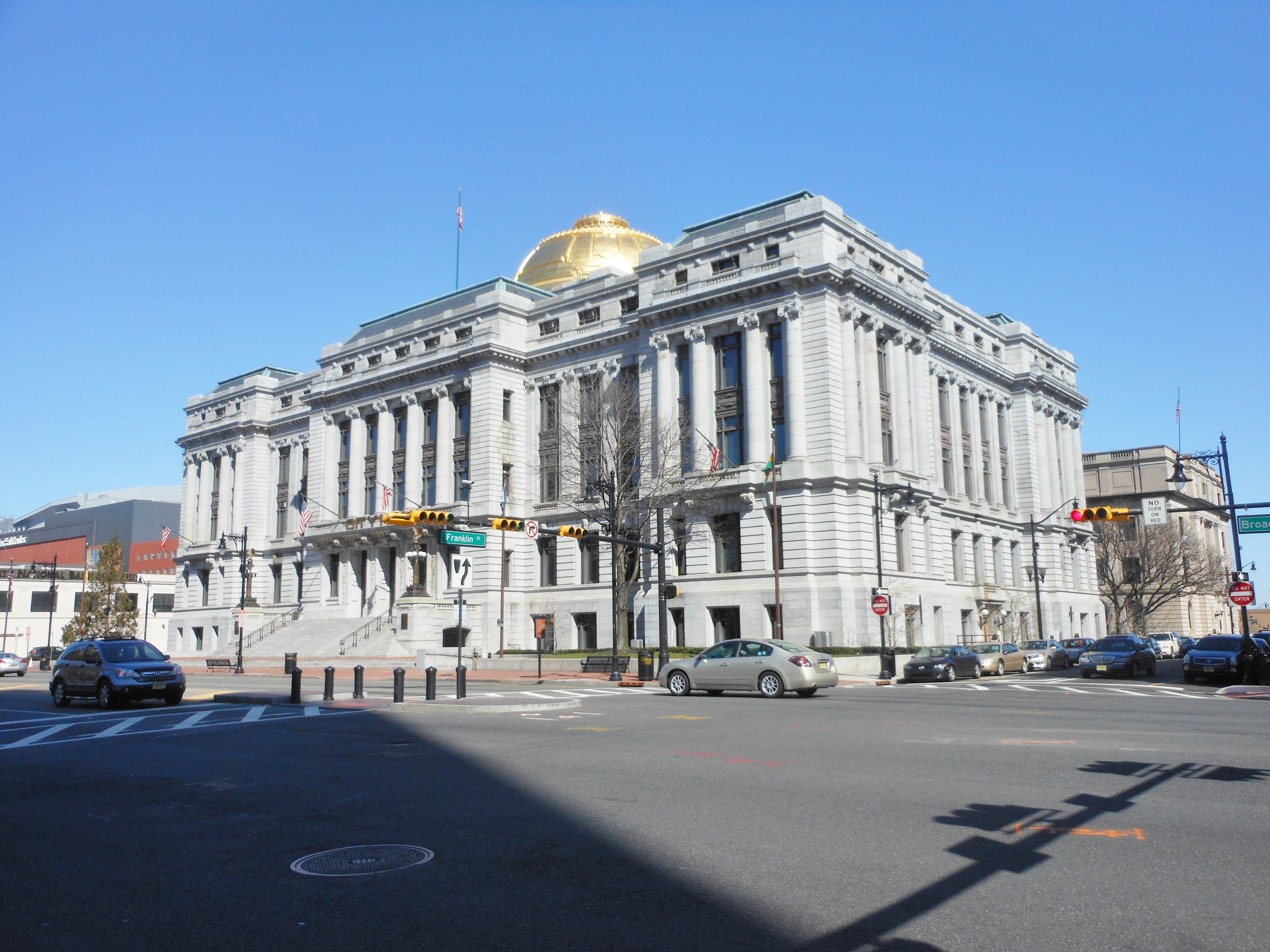
Newark City Hall, designed by John H. & Wilson C. Ely in the Neoclassical style and completed in 1906.

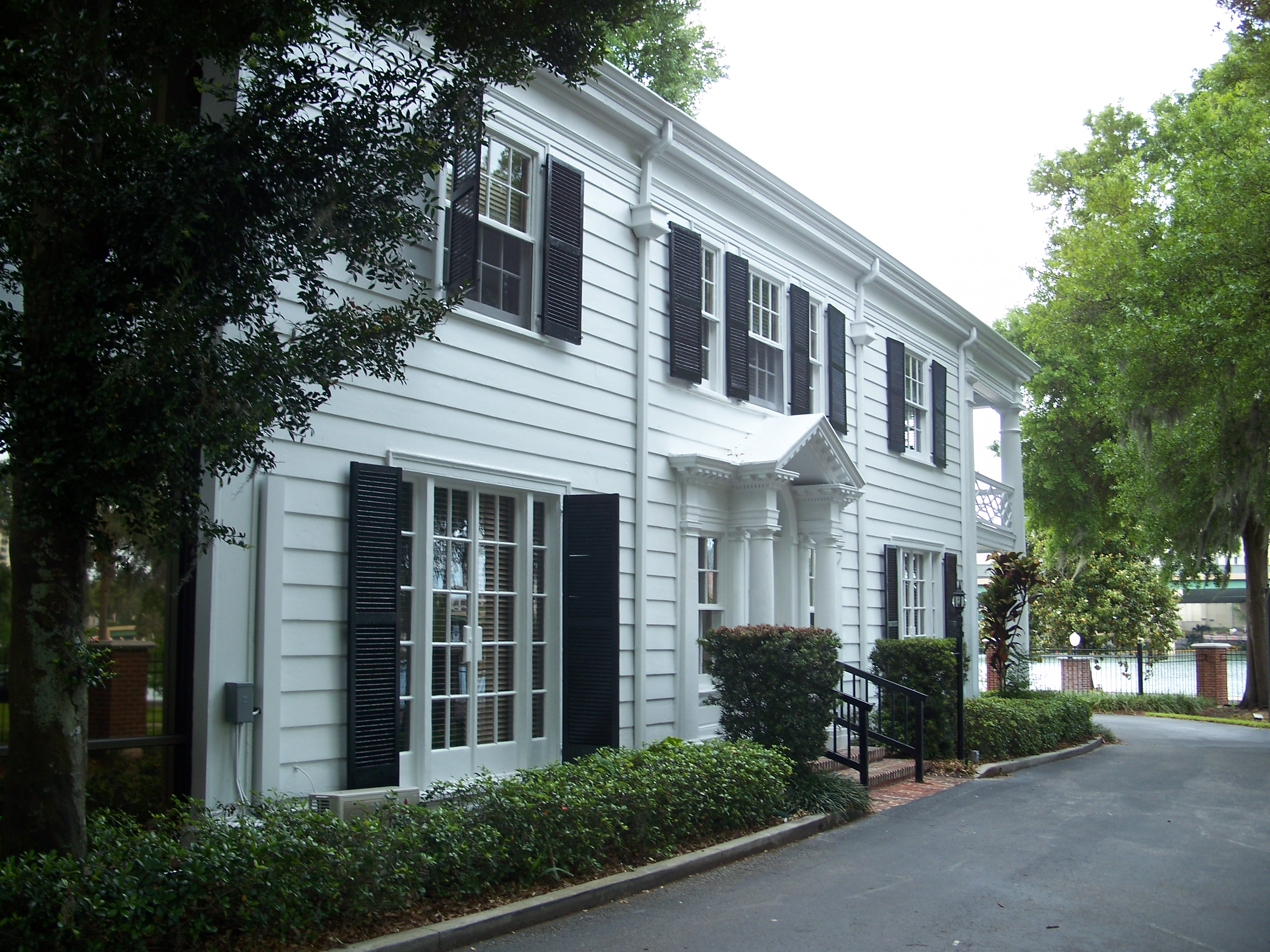
The J. J. Bridges House in Orlando, Florida, designed by John H. & Wilson C. Ely in the Colonial Revival style and completed in 1916.

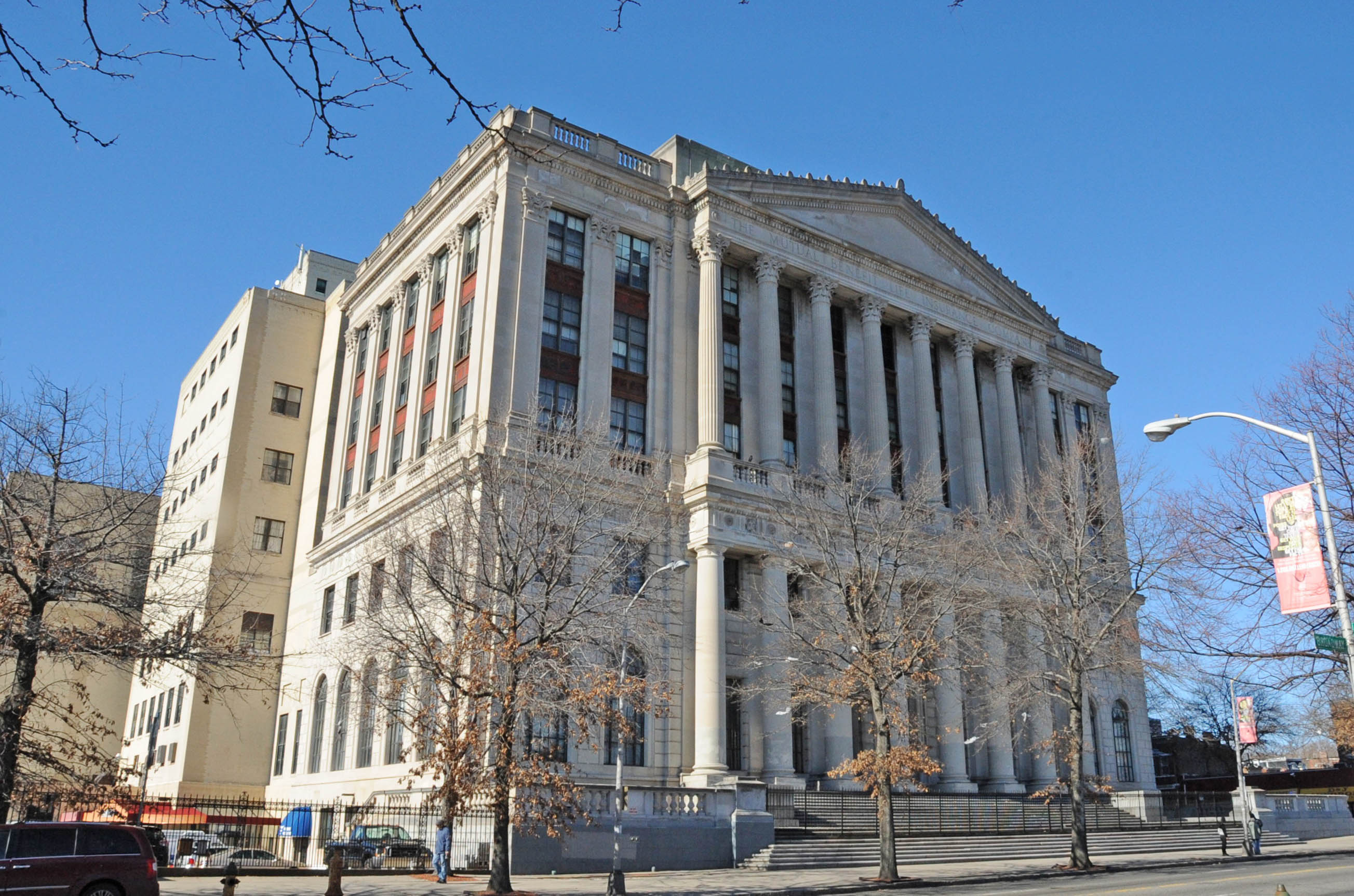
The Mutual Benefit Life Building in Newark, designed by John H. & Wilson C. Ely in the Neoclassical style and completed in 1925.

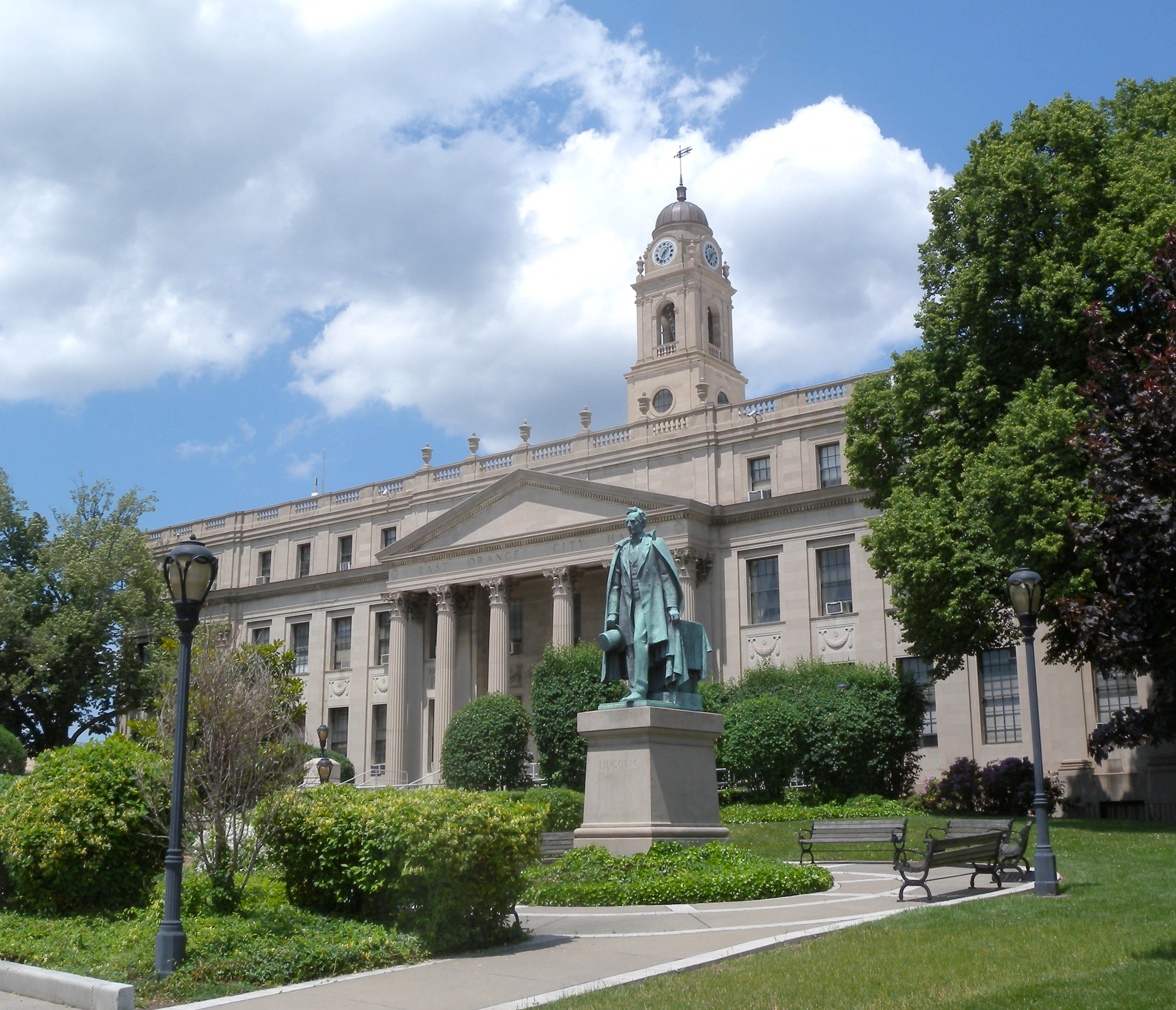
East Orange City Hall, designed by John H. & Wilson C. Ely in the Neoclassical style and completed in 1929.

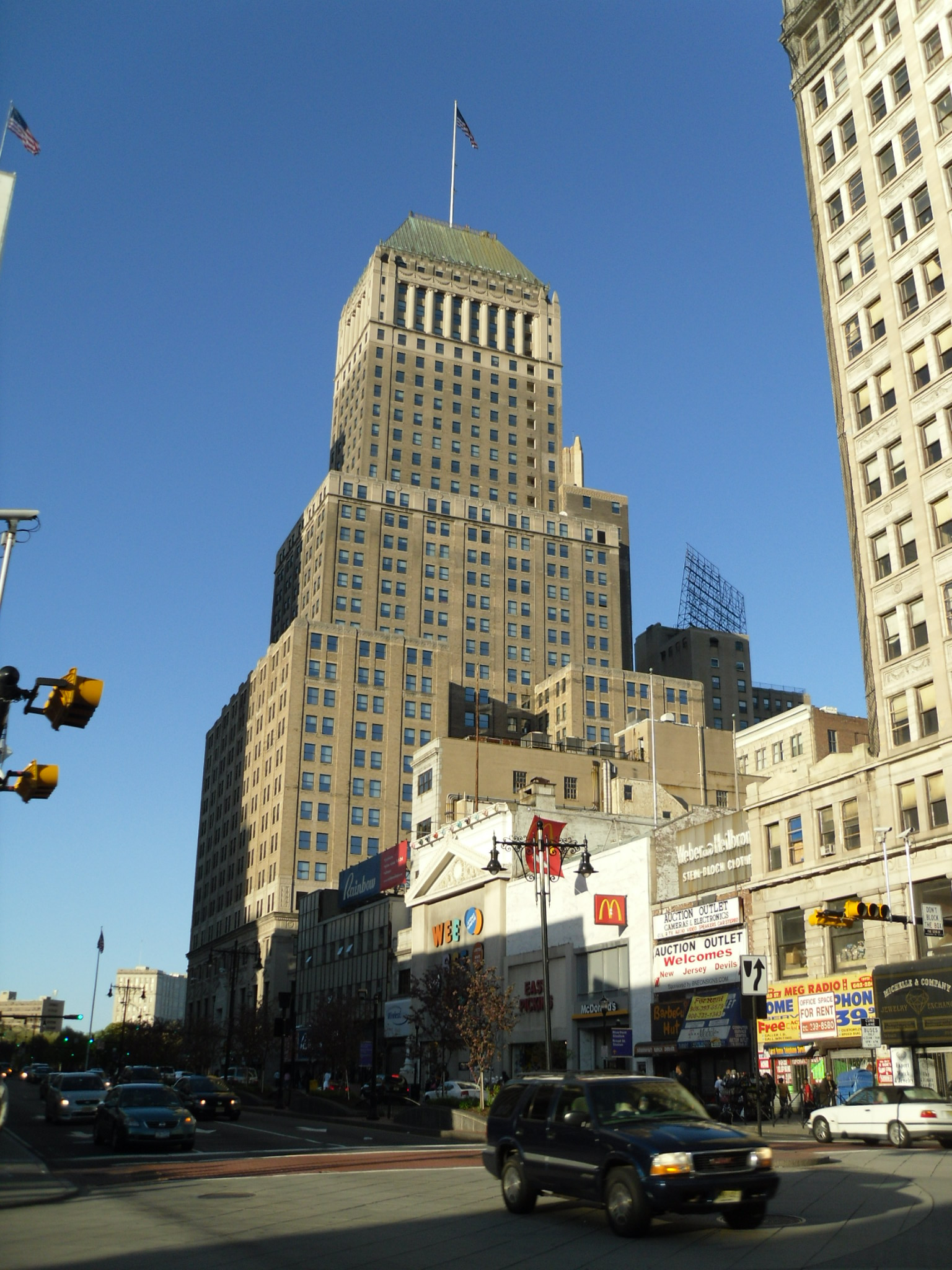
The National Newark Building, designed by John H. & Wilson C. Ely in the Neoclassical style and completed in 1931.

John H. & Wilson C. Ely was a father and son architectural firm based in Newark, New Jersey responsible for some of the more prominent buildings built in the city in the early 20th century, many in the Classical Revival style.

== History ==
John H. Ely, a native of Pennsylvania, established an office in Newark in 1885. In 1895 he was joined in partnership by his son, Wilson C. Ely. John retired in the late 1920s and died in 1932. Wilson continued the firm as a sole proprietor until 1958, when he formed the partnership of Ely & Campbell with John A. Campbell, a Scottish-born architect who had been employed by the Elys since 1910. Wilson died the next year, and Campbell continued the firm alone until his retirement circa 1971. He died in 1976.

== Father and son ==
=== John H. Ely ===
John Holcomb Ely AIA (June 13, 1851 – April 21, 1932) was born in New Hope, Pennsylvania, to Matthias C. Ely, a carpenter and builder, and Keziah Ely, née Stackhouse. The family moved to New Jersey when he was young, and he was educated in the New Jersey public schools. He trained as an architect, and established himself in Newark in 1885.

Ely was active in Democratic Party politics and served on the Newark City Council during the 1890s. He later served on several city commissions and was a trustee of the Newark Public Library from 1909 to 1914 and of the Newark Museum from 1914 until his death. He was a member of the American Institute of Architects (AIA), the New Jersey Historical Society, the Essex Club, the Washington Association of New Jersey and the masons. Ely was married in 1871 to Lydia Helen Wilson. They had two children, Wilson C. Ely, later his business partner, and Ida M. Bemiss, née Ely. Ely died at home in Newark at the age of 80.

=== Wilson C. Ely ===
Wilson Cowell Ely FAIA (May 29, 1873 – August 28, 1959), his son, was born in Trenton. He was educated in the Newark public schools and spent a four-year apprenticeship with Newark architect James H. Lindsley. He then worked as a draftsman for architects in Newark and New York City before becoming his father's partner.

Ely was married in 1897 to Grace R. Chamberlain. They had two children, one son and one daughter. Ely was a member of the AIA and was a charter member of the New Jersey chapter in 1900. He was elected a Fellow of the AIA in 1931. He died at home in Newark at the age of 86.

== Legacy ==
The Elys were among the leading architects in Newark. Their major competitor was Frank Grad and his sons. They designed a large number of civic and commercial buildings in the Newark area. Wilson described his work as "conservatively modern" and at the time of his death Wilson was remembered as "a leader among America's conservative architects."

At least four buildings designed by the Elys have been listed on the United States National Register of Historic Places.

== Works ==
- 1901 – Newark City Hospital, 116 Fairmount Ave, Newark, New Jersey
  - Demolished.
- 1906 – Newark City Hall, 920 Broad St, Newark, New Jersey
  - Designed by John H. & Wilson C. Ely, architects, with Mowbray & Uffinger, associate architects. NRHP-listed.
- 1916 – J. J. Bridges House, 704 S Kuhl Ave, Orlando, Florida
  - NRHP-listed.
- 1925 – Mutual Benefit Life Building, 300 Broadway, Newark, New Jersey
  - NRHP-listed.
- 1928 – Home Office Building, 10 Park Pl, Newark, New Jersey
  - NRHP-listed.
- 1929 – East Orange City Hall, 44 City Hall Plaza, East Orange, New Jersey
- 1930 – American Insurance Company Building, 15 Washington St, Newark, New Jersey
- 1931 – National Newark Building, 744 Broad St, Newark, New Jersey
  - Based on the Mausoleum at Halicarnassus. The tallest building in Newark.
- 1931 – New Jersey Historical Society (former), 230 Broadway, Newark, New Jersey
- 1941 – Cathedral House, 24 Rector St, Newark, New Jersey
- 1942 – Fidelity and Deposit Company of Maryland office building, 140 William St, New York City
- 1952 – Morristown Memorial Hospital, 100 Madison Ave, Morristown, New Jersey
- 1954 – Morristown Trust Company office building, 225 South St, Morristown, New Jersey
  - Based on the Wren Building of College of William & Mary.
- 1960 – Weston Hall, New Jersey Institute of Technology, Newark, New Jersey

== See also ==
- National Register of Historic Places listings in Essex County, New Jersey
- List of tallest buildings in Newark
- Grad Associates
