= 50 Rector Park =

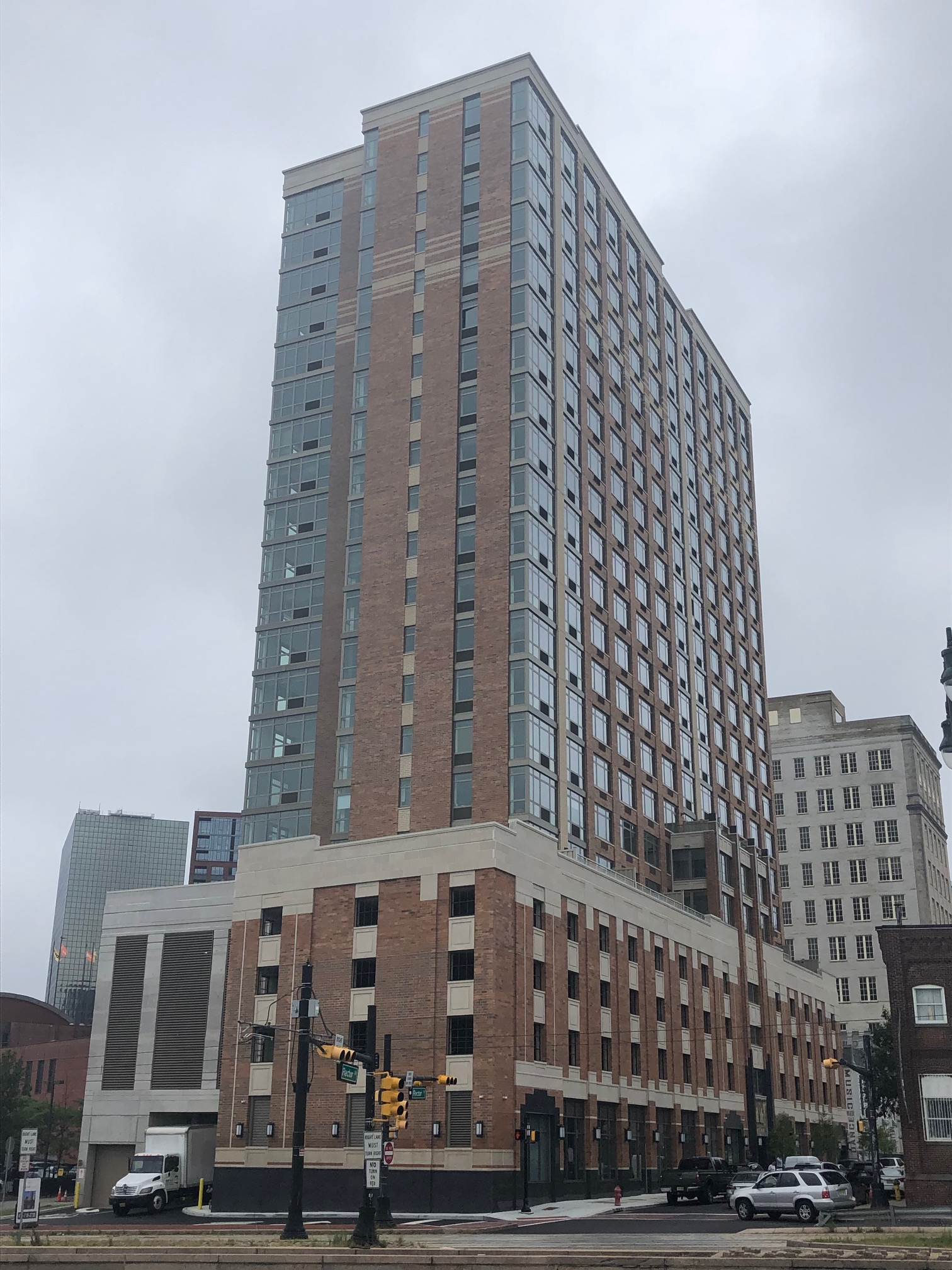
- Interactive map of the 50 Rector Park area

General information
- Status: Completed
- Type: luxury high rise apartments
- Location: 50 Rector Street; Newark, New Jersey
- Coordinates: 40.740169°N 74.167076°W
- Construction started: 2017 (construction start)
- Completed: June 14, 2019
- Opening: June 2019
- Cost: $79 million USD
- Management: Boraie Development

Height
- Antenna spire: no
- Roof: 90.25 m (296.1 ft)

Technical details
- Floor count: 22
- Lifts/elevators: 4

Design and construction
- Architect: Costas Kondylis
- Developer: Boraie Development

Website
- https://www.50rectorpark.com/

50 Rector Park is an apartment building in Newark, New Jersey, the first market rate residential high-rise to be newly built in the city since 1962. Originally called One Riverview and later 1 Rector Street, there was a groundbreaking in 2013, but construction did not begin at the site until the spring of 2017. It was topped out in April 2018 and opened June 2019.

== Location ==
50 Rector Park is adjacent to the New Jersey Performing Arts Center (NJPAC) and next to the center's education facility at 24 Rector Street in Downtown Newark. It is near McCarter Highway, across from which is Newark Riverfront Park on the Passaic River. The NJPAC-Center Street station of the Newark Light Rail is a block away; Newark Penn Station is a few short blocks away.

The building is seen as a major boost to the Newark's Living Downtown Plan, an effort to create transform Downtown from a 9–5 work place to a vibrant 24/7 community. It is one of several residential projects slated for the area around a renovated Military Park and nearby Washington Park. Other projects include the adaptive re-use of the American Insurance Company Building, the former flagship department store of Hahne and Company, the New Jersey Bell Headquarters Building, and the new construction of One Theater Square, among others.

== Design ==
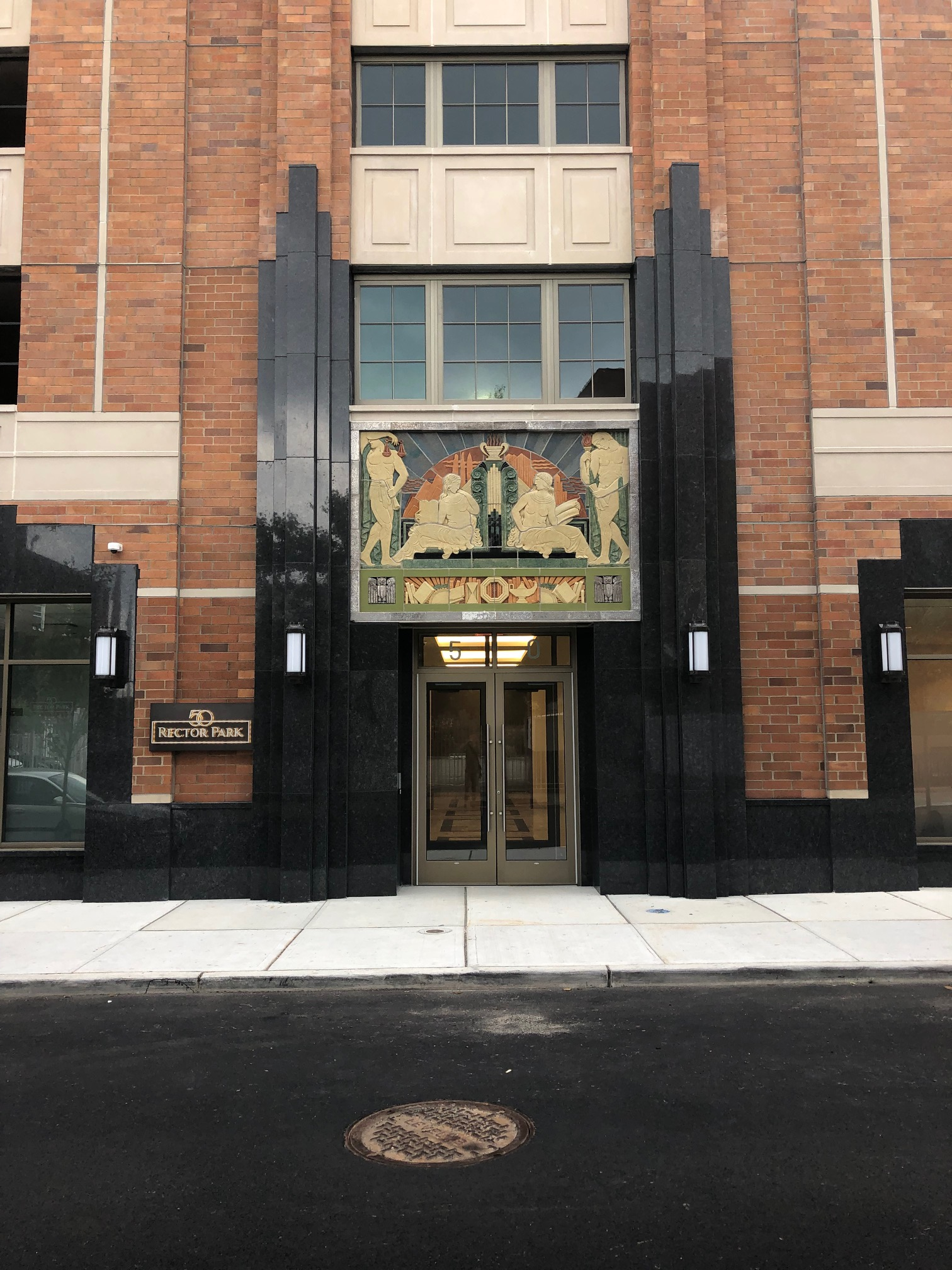
Terracotta relief from earlier building

The complex was originally planned to incorporate an historic six-story building that was once part of Ballantine Brewery. It was later used by the University of Newark then two years later the NJ Law School joined, becoming Rutgers School of Law and until 2006 the city's Science High School.

A new 26-story high-rise was to be built adjacent to it, incorporating the landmark, but the brewery/school building was eventually demolished. The new building has 169 rental units and 7,640 square feet of ground floor retail space as well 117 tenant parking spaces.

== Developers ==
50 Rector Park is a collaboration by Newark native Shaquille O'Neal and New Brunswick-based Boraie Development. The project received a New Jersey Economic Development Authority Urban Transit Hub Tax Credit and the Municipal Council of Newark adopted a resolution for $5 million tax credit in February 2013. Goldman Sachs has provided financing, while Newark-based Prudential Financial bought re-development area bonds issued by the city. The One Riverview project initiated work in September 2013. O'Neal has stated that he plans to move into the top floor when the tower is completed and that he would then like his "mother to come back here and just smile".

== See also ==
- One Theater Square
- List of tallest buildings in Newark
