= J. J. Bridges House =

Historic house in Florida, United States

- U.S. National Register of Historic Places
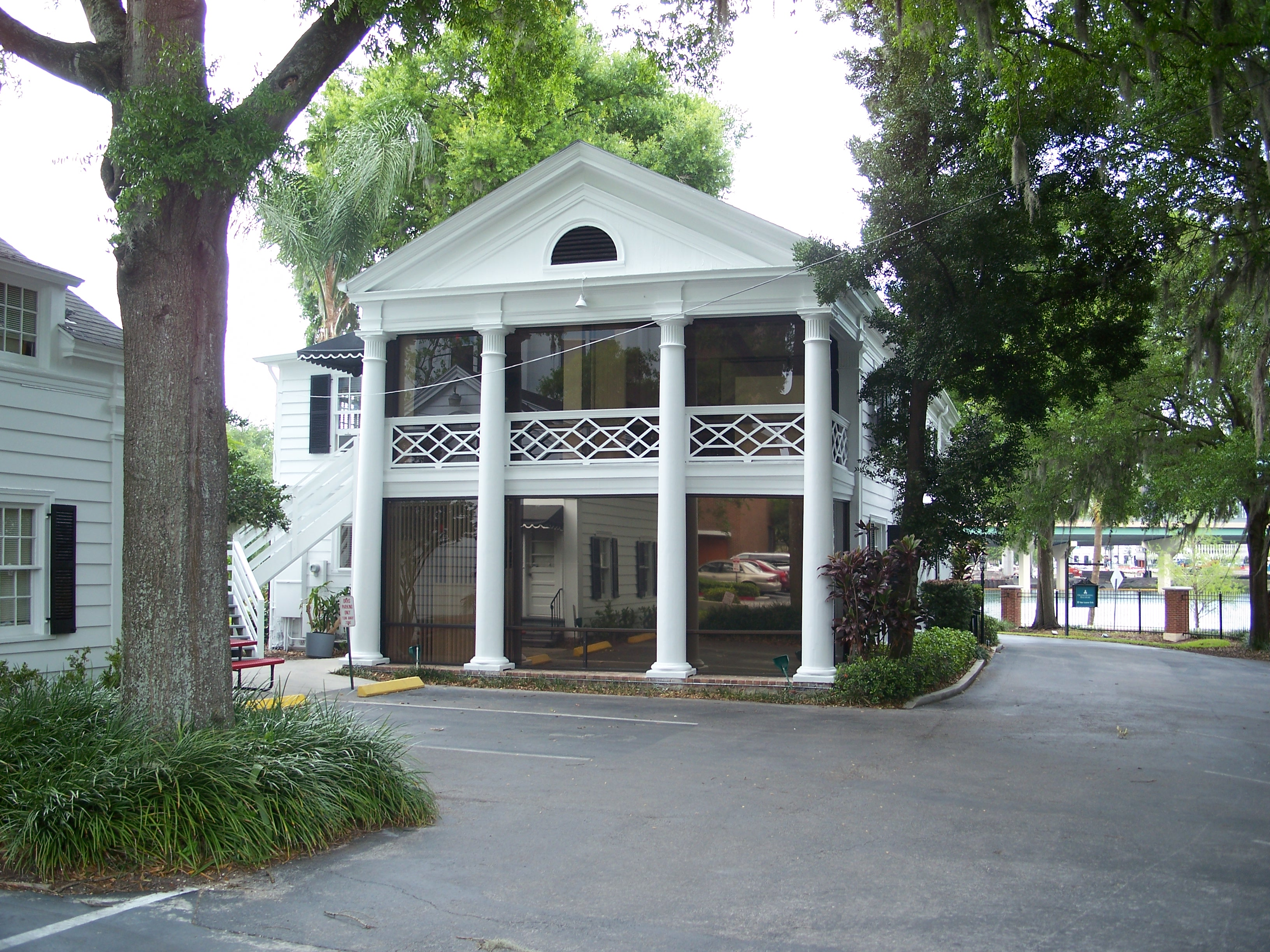

- Location within Florida Location within the United States
- Location: 704 S. Kuhl Avenue, Orlando, Florida
- Coordinates: 28°31′59″N 81°22′38″W
- Area: less than one acre
- Built: 1916
- Built by: Henry Green
- Architect: Wilson C. Ely
- Architectural style: Colonial Revival
- NRHP reference No.: 84000932
- Added to NRHP: January 26, 1984

The J. J. Bridges House is a historic house located at 704 South Kuhl Avenue in Orlando, Florida. It is locally significant as the first of the highly academic Colonial Revival style homes built in the city.

== Description and history ==
The house was designed by John H. & Wilson C. Ely, and built in 1916. It was added to the National Register of Historic Places on January 26, 1984.

== Gallery ==
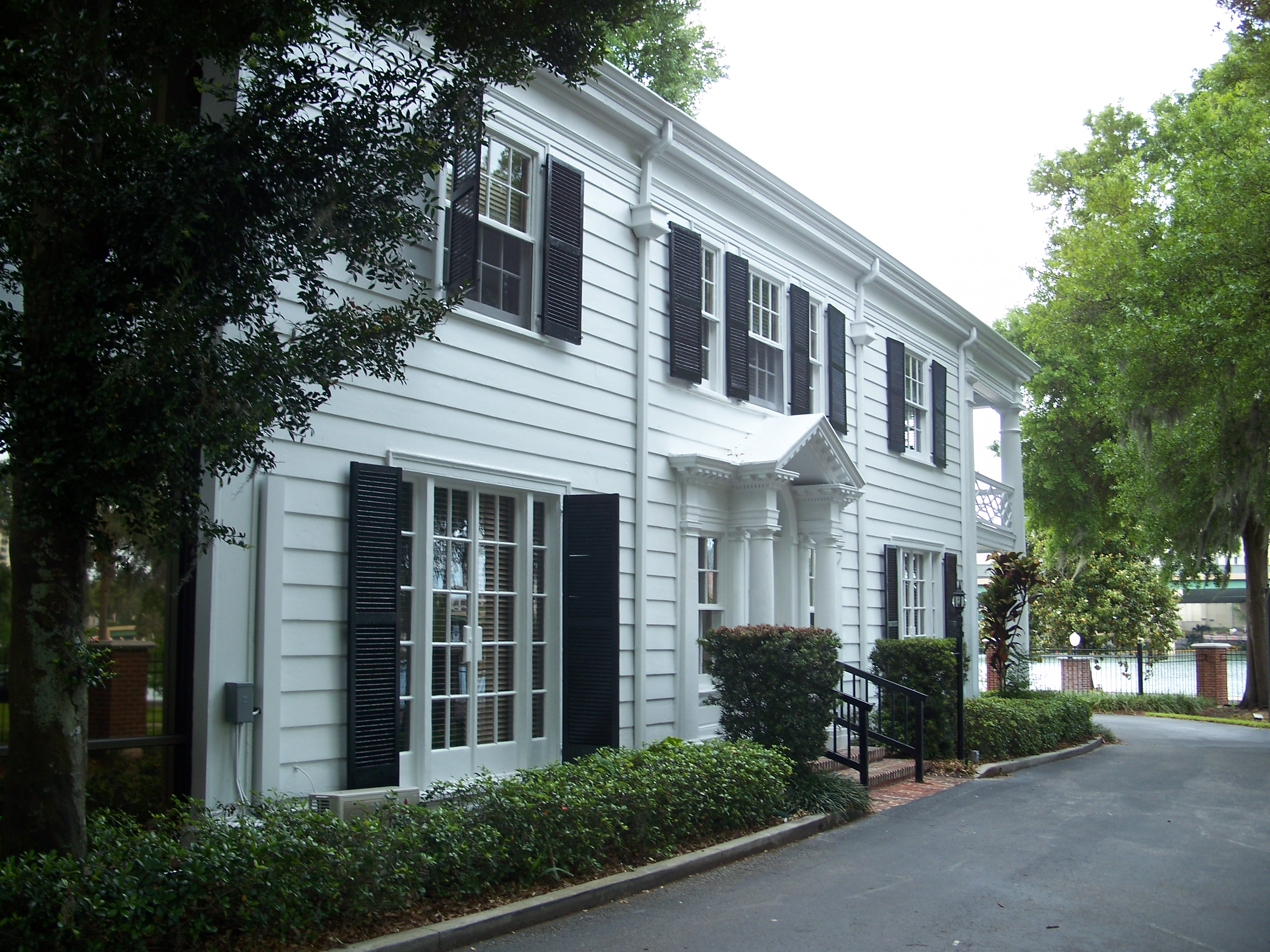

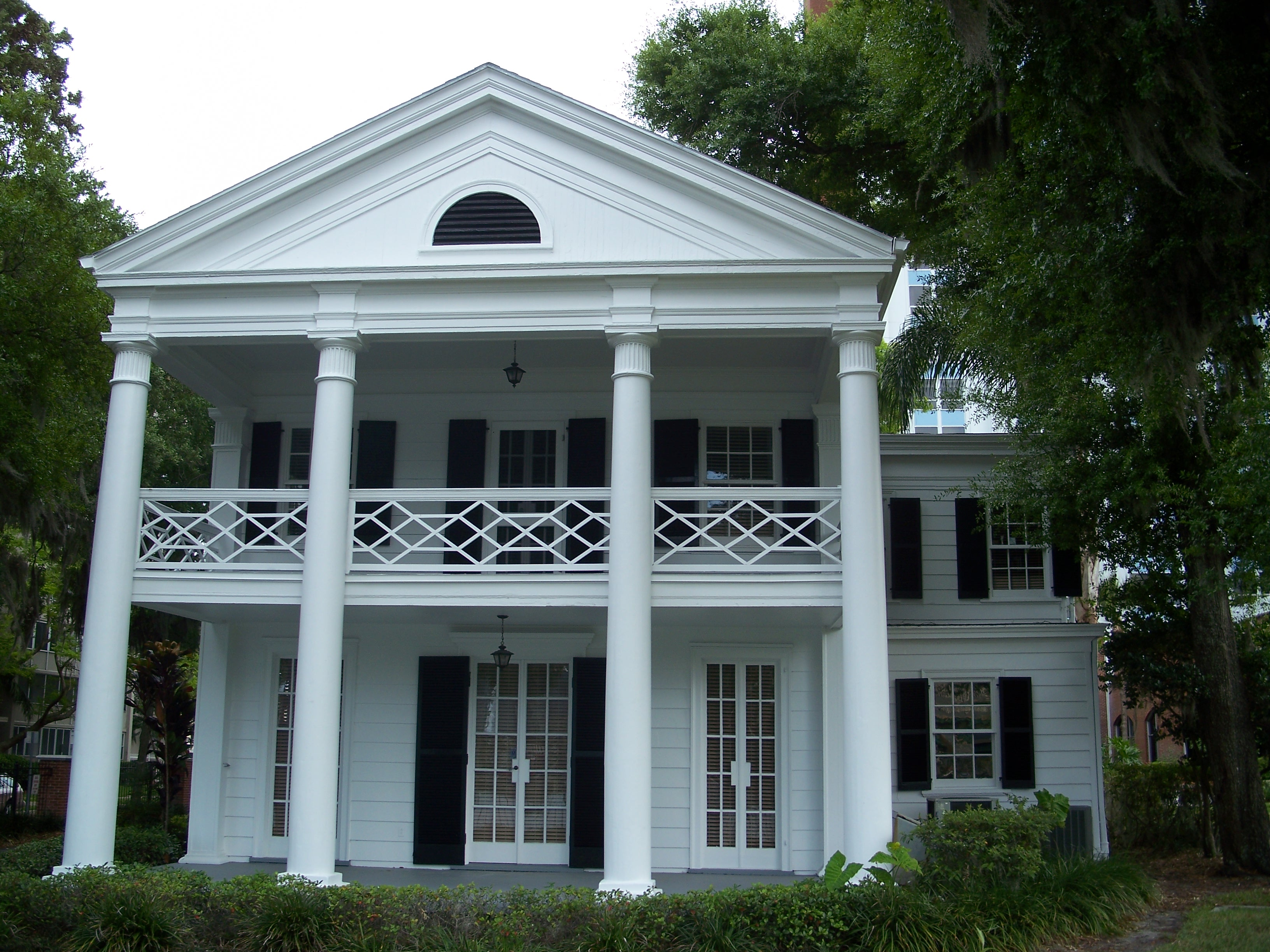

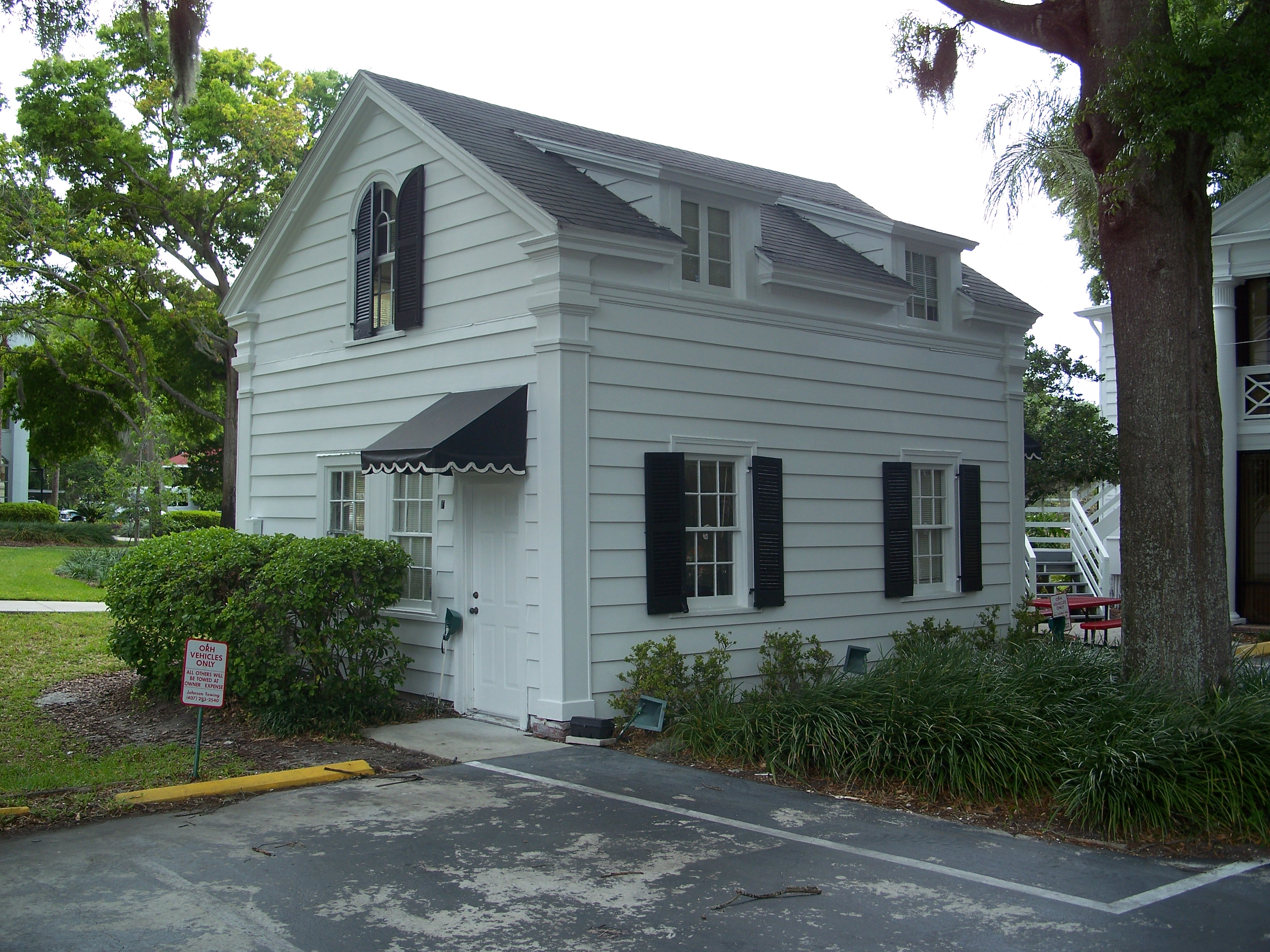
Small building next to Bridges House

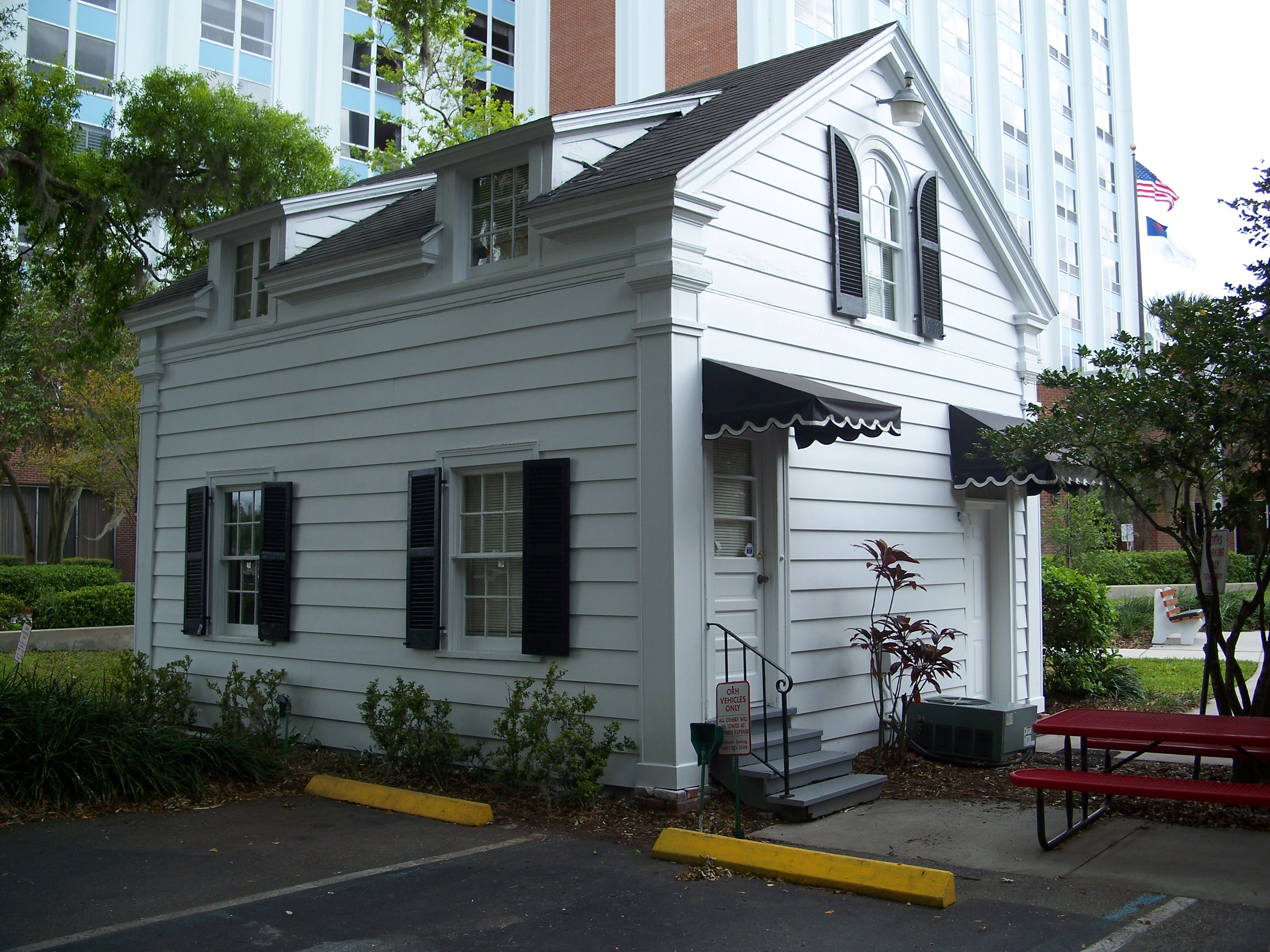
Small building next to Bridges House
