= First National State Bank Building =

- U.S. National Register of Historic Places
- New Jersey Register of Historic Places
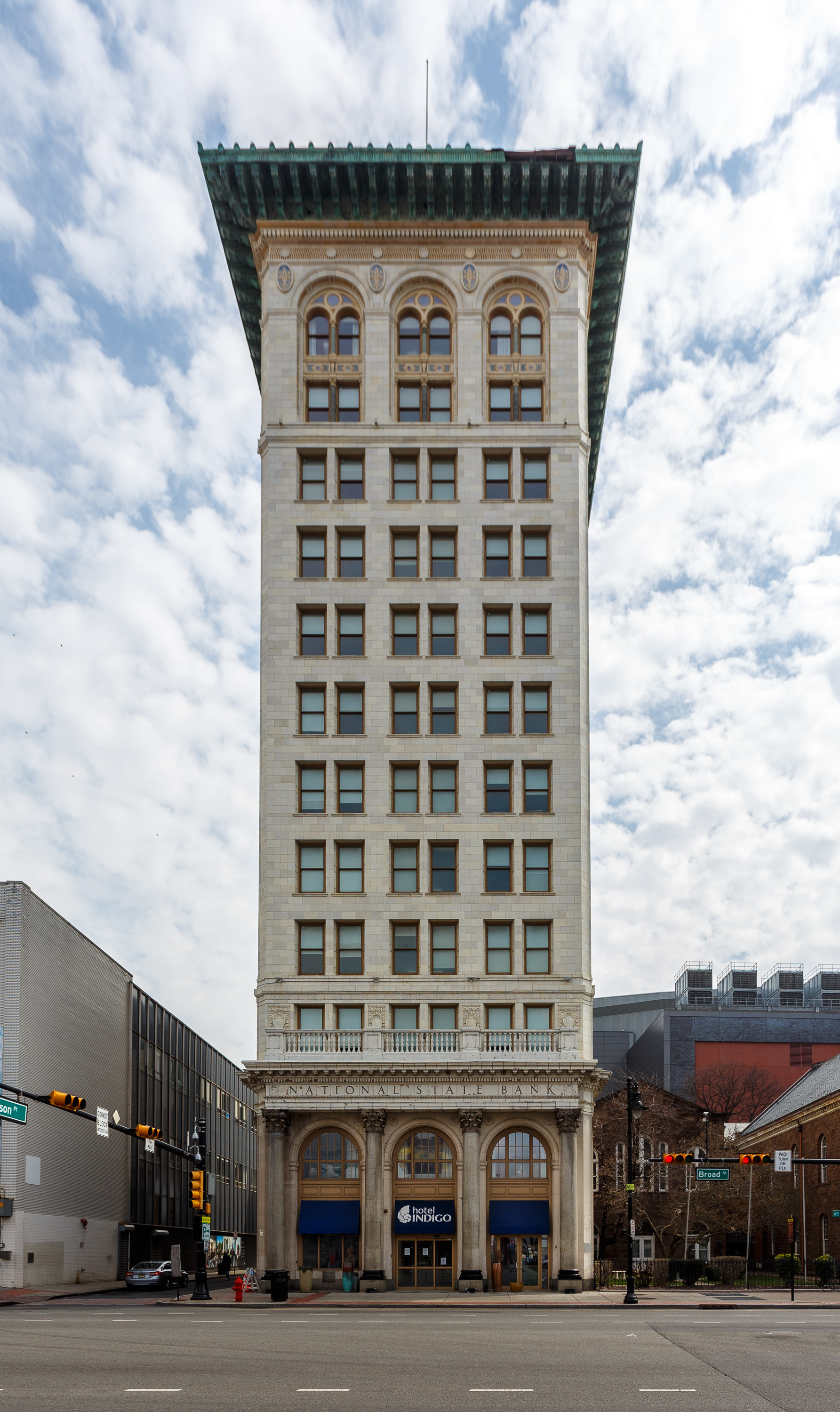

- Location within Essex County, New Jersey Location within New Jersey Location within the United States
- Location: 810 Broad Street, Newark, New Jersey
- Coordinates: 40°44′5″N 74°10′20″W
- Area: 0.1 acres (0.040 ha)
- Built: 1912
- Architect: Cass Gilbert
- Website: www.indigoresidence.com
- NRHP reference No.: 77000866
- NJRHP No.: 1255

Significant dates
- Added to NRHP: August 10, 1977
- Designated NJRHP: December 27, 1976

The First National State Bank Building, also known as the Indigo Residence, is located at 810 Broad Street in Newark, New Jersey, United States. The building was designed by Cass Gilbert and was built in 1912. The building stands 165 ft (50 m) and is twelve stories tall with a steel frame and with a facade of applied masonry. It was added to the National Register of Historic Places on August 10, 1977.

Although the ground floor was occupied by a series of retail establishments, the upper floors were abandoned for many years. The building was renovated and converted into a Hotel Indigo by Hanini Developers and opened in August 2014.

In 2021, the hotel and building were sold to Baldwin Equities, who subsequently converted it into a luxury apartment complex named Indigo Residence. The apartments offers a choice between studio and loft layouts. The rent structure is all-inclusive, covering high-speed Wi-Fi, electricity, cooling, and heating in a single monthly charge. Each apartment is fully furnished with space-maximizing Italian furniture, features Calacata gold countertops, and includes spacious, spa-inspired bathrooms.

== See also ==
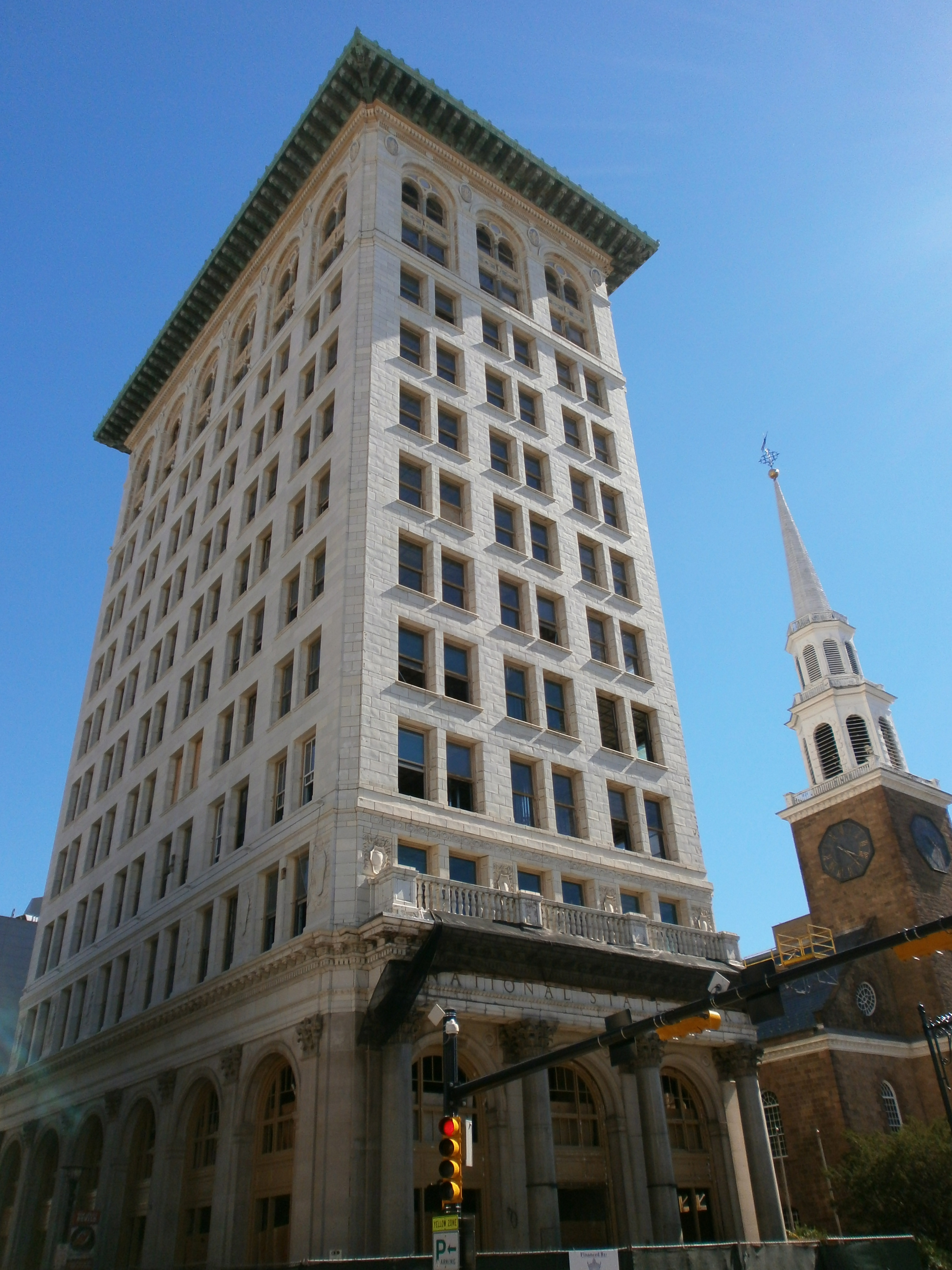
Close view

- National Register of Historic Places listings in Essex County, New Jersey
- List of tallest buildings in Newark
- Four Corners Historic District
