= Four Corners (Newark) =

Historic district in Essex County, New Jersey, US

- Four Corners Historic District
- U.S. National Register of Historic Places
- U.S. Historic district
- New Jersey Register of Historic Places
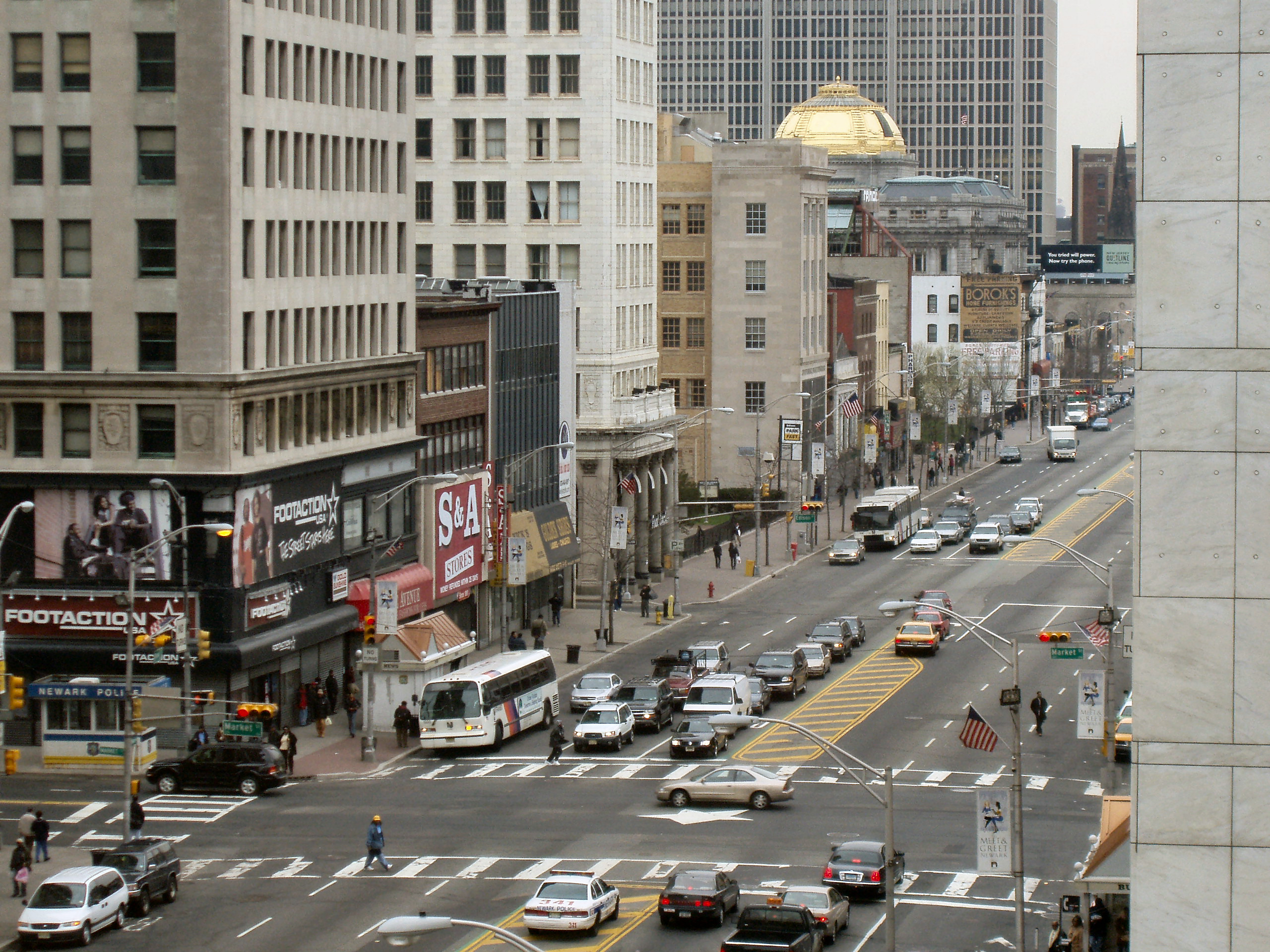
- Looking south at Market and Broad with gold-domed Newark City Hall in distance

- Location within Essex County, New Jersey Location within New Jersey Location within the United States
- Location: Roughly bounded by Raymond Boulevard, Mulberry, Hill, and Washington Streets.
- Coordinates: 40.735560°N 74.172172°W
- Area: 85 acres (34 ha)
- Architectural style: Renaissance, Italianate, 19th and 20th-century eclectic
- NRHP reference No.: 00001061
- NJRHP No.: 126

Significant dates
- Added to NRHP: September 8, 2000
- Designated NJRHP: November 18, 1999

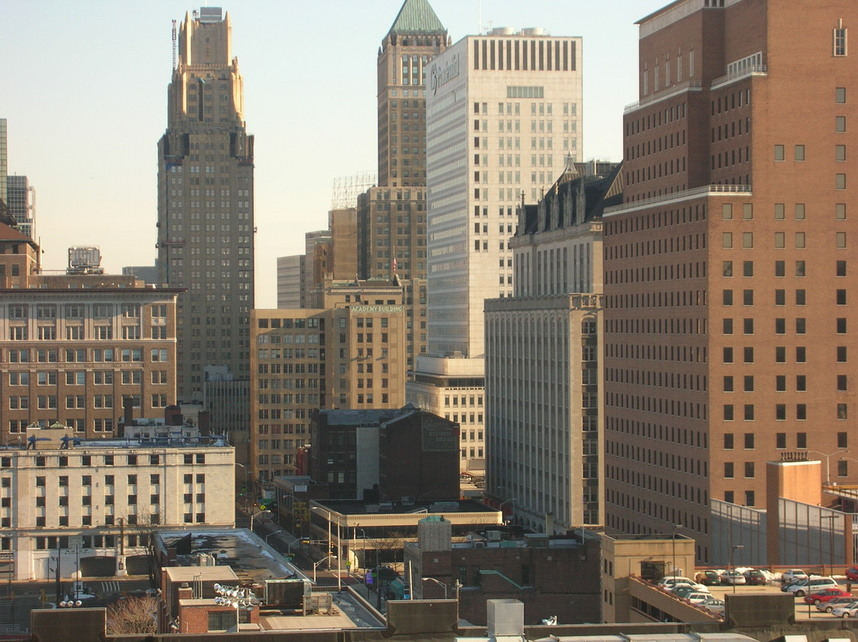
The city's tallest buildings north of Market Street

The Four Corners Historic District is the intersection of Broad and Market Streets in Newark, New Jersey. It is the site of the city's earliest settlement and the heart of Downtown Newark that at one time was considered the busiest intersection in the United States. The area that radiates twenty-two square blocks from the crossroads is a state and federal historic district.

The crossing became the center of the town soon after establishment in 1666; the home of founder Robert Treat was located at the southwest corner. During the next centuries it remained the focal point of the city which grew around it. By 1834, the United New Jersey Railroad and Canal Company had established a terminal to the south and in 1869, the Newark and New York Railroad had one to the north. During the period of massive expansion at the start of the 20th century, the district became the city's modern business district, and site of its first skyscraper built by the Firemen's Insurance Company at the southeast corner in 1910. The Newark Public Service Terminal on Broad Street opened in 1916. Though faded in its former glory, the Four Corners district remains Newark's traditional center for commerce and business and since the late 2000s, the focus of much interest in revitalizing retail, residential, and restaurant activity downtown.

== Broad and Market ==
The names and the crossing of streets named Broad and Market is seen in many of the colonial cities in New Jersey, such as Paterson and Trenton and the United States, such as Philadelphia. In Newark, Broad Street, as the name suggests, is a wide avenue which runs north to Military Park and Broad Street Station, while to the south it passes Government Center and Symphony Hall. Market Street to the east passes Gateway Center and Newark Penn Station, while to the west are the Essex County Veterans Courthouse and the university campuses located in the city. The intersection has long been a busy crossroad. In 1915, Public Service counted over 280,000 pedestrian crossings in one thirteen-hour period. Eleven years later, on October 26, 1926, a State Motor Vehicle Department check at the Four Corners counted 2,644 trolleys, 4,098 buses, 2,657 taxis, 3,474 commercial vehicles, and 23,571 automobiles. Between 1925 and 1939 a staffed 24-foot-tall (7.3 m) traffic control tower stood at the intersection.

== Historic district ==
The historic district is one of seven in Newark. The Four Corners Historic District is roughly bounded by Raymond Boulevard, Mulberry, Hill, and Washington streets and University Avenue. The district established in 1999–2000 encompasses an area of 85 acres (340,000 m^{2}) and includes many buildings which themselves are listed on the national and state registers of historic places. The area is considered vital in the redevelopment of the city, located between city attractions, residential neighborhoods, educational and commercial institutions. In 2010, in order to promote the restoration of facades in the district the city has implemented stricter signage policy for any renovations.

The northwest quadrant of the district has been home to Prudential Headquarters since its founding. Three buildings built by the finance company, including the Gibraltar Building on Halsey Street, are found there, as is the original flagship store of the department store Bamberger's.

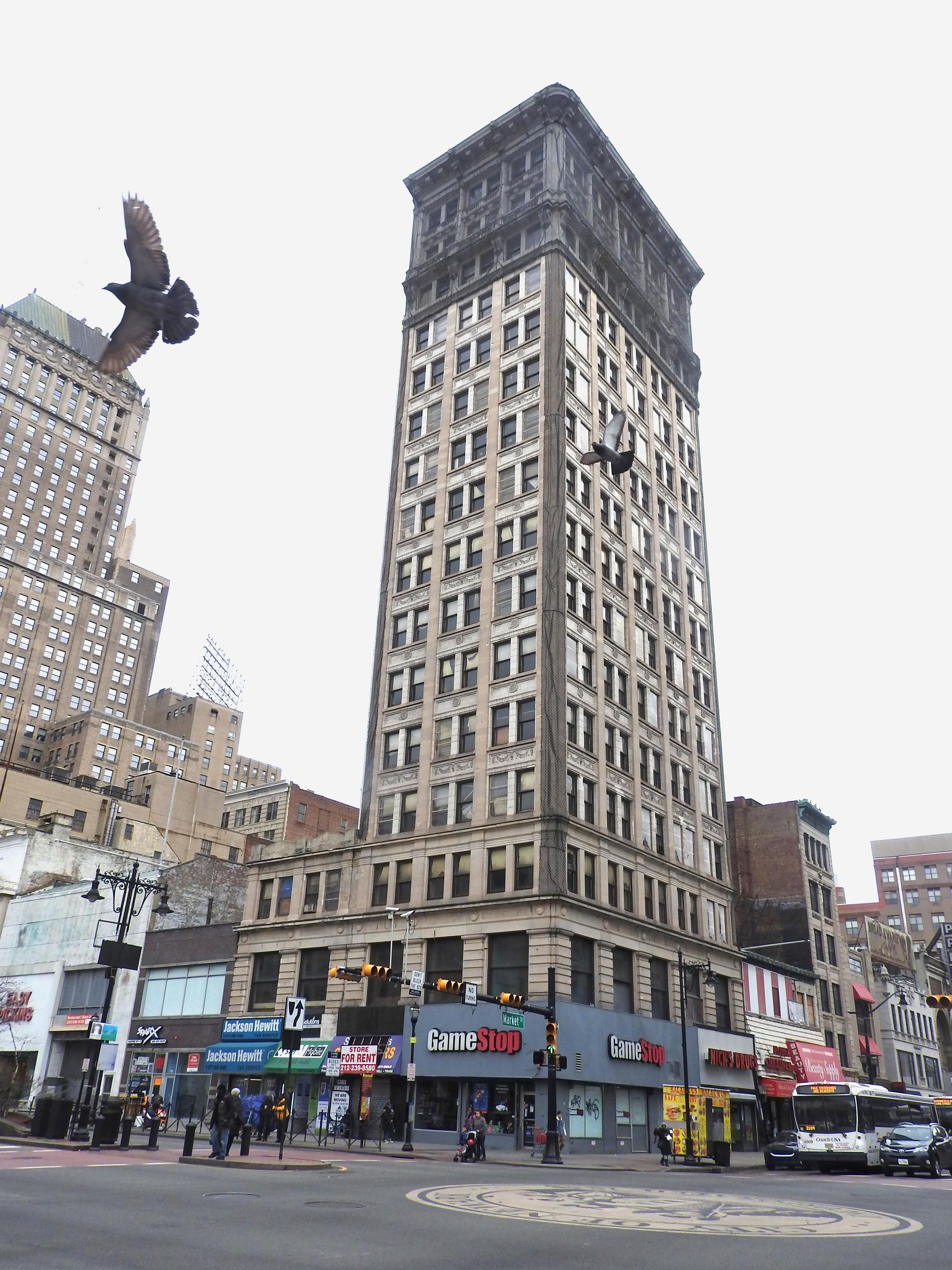
The Fireman's Insurance Company Building (1910) at the northeast corner is considered the city's first skyscraper

The city's two tallest buildings, the neoclassical National Newark and Art Deco Eleven 80, are found in the northeast quadrant near the abutting historic district of Military Park.

The southeast quadrant is home to the Kinney Building, Old First Presbyterian Church, the First National State Bank Building, the Newark and New York Railroad terminal, Newark City Hall at Government Center and historic Grace Church (Episcopal). The Prudential Center borders this section at Mulberry Street. A new hotel (Mariott Courtyard) and retail complex at Broad and Lafayette Streets is located there. Several buildings in the southeast quadrant have been renovated for residential spaces.

The southwest quadrant of the historic district is home to Teachers Village, a neighborhood in which since 2010s has undergone revitalization through new construction and renovation. New construction and renovations in the neighborhood such as the mixed-use buildings, the William Flats, the approved 19-story Vibe and the planned 40-story Halo. as well as new restaurants, shops, bank, and a planned Eataly-style food marketplace. An IHOP restaurant with five floors of market rate apartments on top is under construction at the intersection of Broad and Hill streets.

== Four Corners Millennium Project ==
In December 2012, the city council approved plans for further renovations in the district which would extend the neighborhood to Market Street that would rehabilitate former commercial buildings to residential and retail spaces. A similar proposal has been made for the former Newark Paramount Theatre movie palace. In January 2014, the Four Corners Millennium Project was awarded $52 million in New Jersey State Economic Development grants.

== See also ==
- National Register of Historic Places listings in Essex County, New Jersey
- List of tallest buildings in Newark
- Government Center (Newark)
