= Newark City Hall =

- U.S. National Register of Historic Places
- New Jersey Register of Historic Places
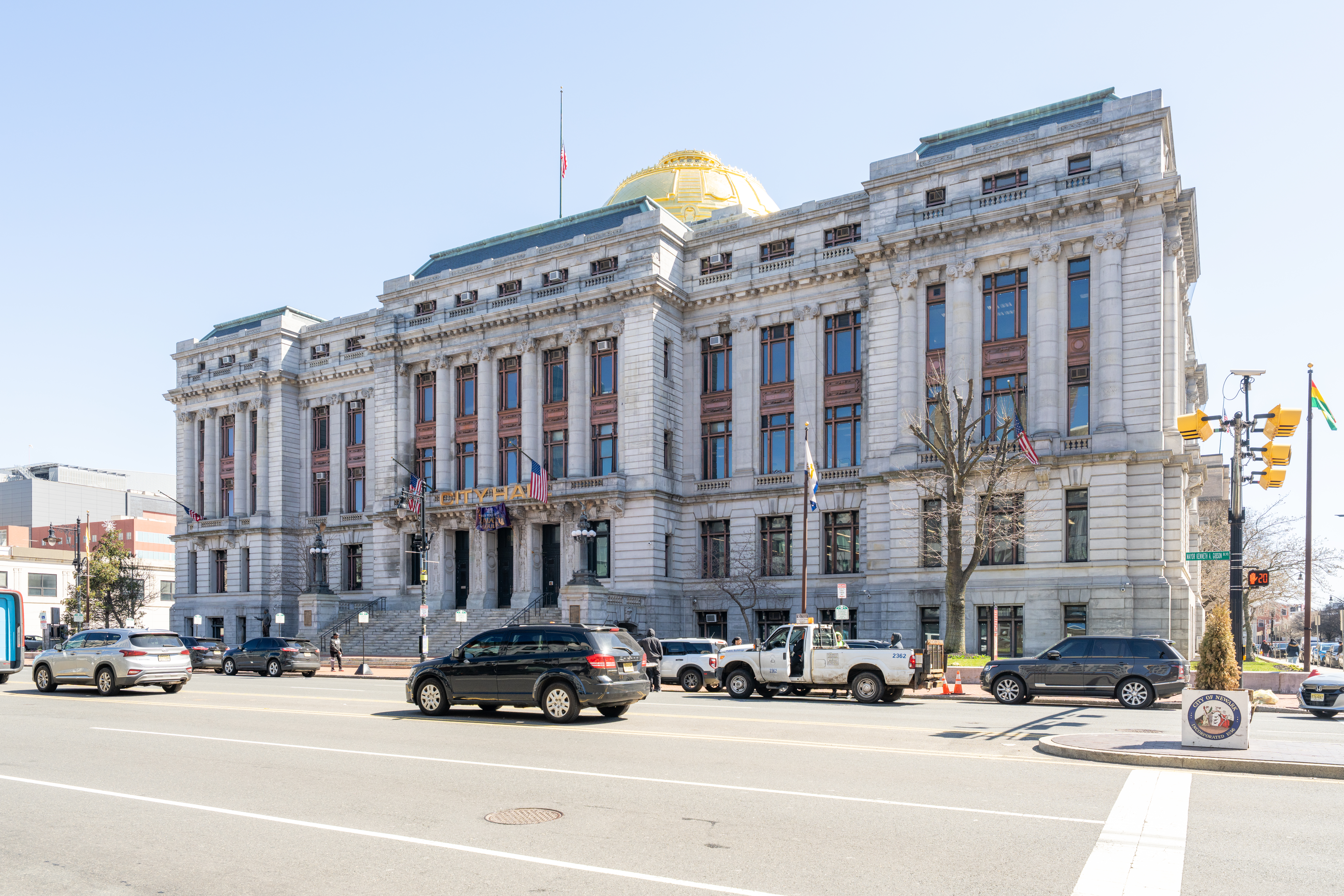
- Newark City Hall in 2026

- Location within Essex County, New Jersey Location within New Jersey Location within the United States
- Location: 920 Broad Street; Newark, New Jersey, U.S.
- Coordinates: 40°43′54″N 74°10′27″W
- Area: 2 acres (0.81 ha)
- Built: 1902
- Architects: John H. & Wilson C. Ely; Mowbray and Uffinger
- Architectural style: Beaux Arts
- NRHP reference No.: 78001759
- NJRHP No.: 1293

Significant dates
- Added to NRHP: February 17, 1978
- Designated NJRHP: August 19, 1977

Newark City Hall is located at Government Center in Newark in Essex County, New Jersey. The building was built in 1902 and was added to the National Register of Historic Places on February 17, 1978.

== History ==
The building is a five-story Beaux Arts style building with a golden dome; built at a cost of $2.6 million. The interior of the building features carved marble, a grand central staircase, stained-glass skylights, decorative plaster and wrought-iron works. Developer Harry Grant paid to have the dome covered in 24 carat gold in 1986. The building was renovated in 2006 at a cost of $18 Million.

== See also ==
- National Register of Historic Places listings in Essex County, New Jersey
- Four Corners (Newark)
