= Home Office Building =

- U.S. National Register of Historic Places
- New Jersey Register of Historic Places
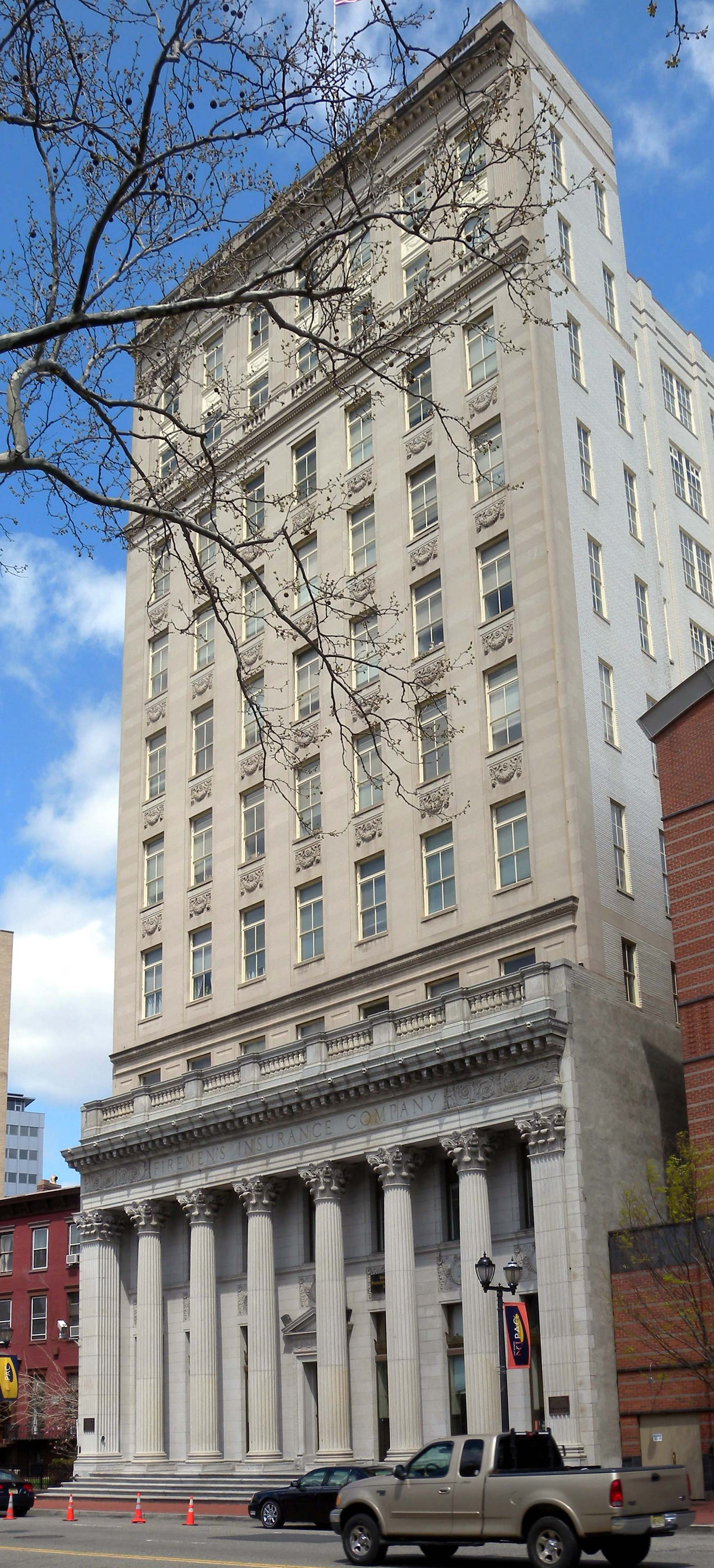

- Location within Essex County, New Jersey Location within New Jersey Location within the United States
- Location: 8-12 Park Place, Newark, New Jersey
- Coordinates: 40°44′25.6″N 74°10′6″W
- Area: 0.6 acres (0.24 ha)
- Built: 1928
- Architect: John H. & Wilson C. Ely
- Architectural style: Classical Revival
- NRHP reference No.: 82003273
- NJRHP No.: 1253

Significant dates
- Added to NRHP: June 17, 1982
- Designated NJRHP: April 30, 1982

The Home Office Building is located adjacent to Military Park at 10 Park Place in Newark, Essex County, New Jersey, United States. The building was built in 1928 and was added to the National Register of Historic Places on June 17, 1982.

The building is one of two existing structures in downtown Newark commissioned by the Firemen's Insurance Company, an insurance company founded in 1855, to house its offices.

The Military Park building was designed by prominent father-and-son Newark architects John H. & Wilson C. Ely. Construction began in 1924 and the building was completed in 1928. In 1982 the building was designated a New Jersey Historic Place and a National Historic Place. The 10-story building has 16,000 square feet (1,490 m^{2}) of space. The Berger Organization purchased the building in 1990, the same year a plaque was placed on it by the Newark Preservation and Landmarks Committee. The building underwent renovations in 2006.

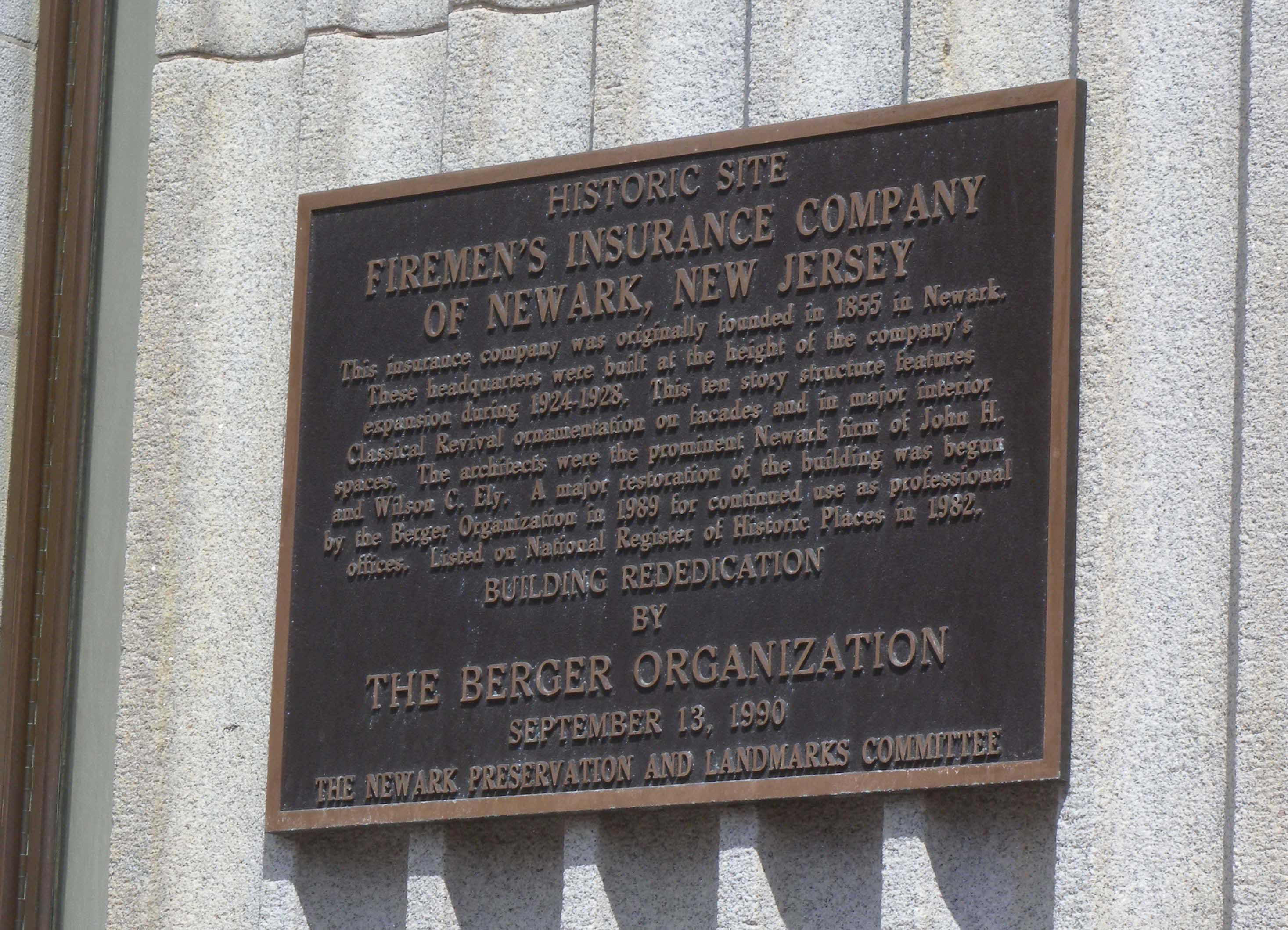
Newark Preservation and Landmarks Committee plaque.

An inscription on a bronze plaque placed by the Newark Preservation and Landmarks Committee reads:

This insurance company was founded in 1855 in Newark. These headquarters were built during the height of the company's expansion in 1924-1928. This ten story structure features Classical Revival ornamentation on facades and in major interior spaces. The architects were the prominent Newark firm John H. and Wilson C. Ely. A major restoration of the building by the Berger Organization was begun in 1989 for continued use as professional offices ...

There are proposals to convert the building to residences.

== Firemen's Insurance Building ==
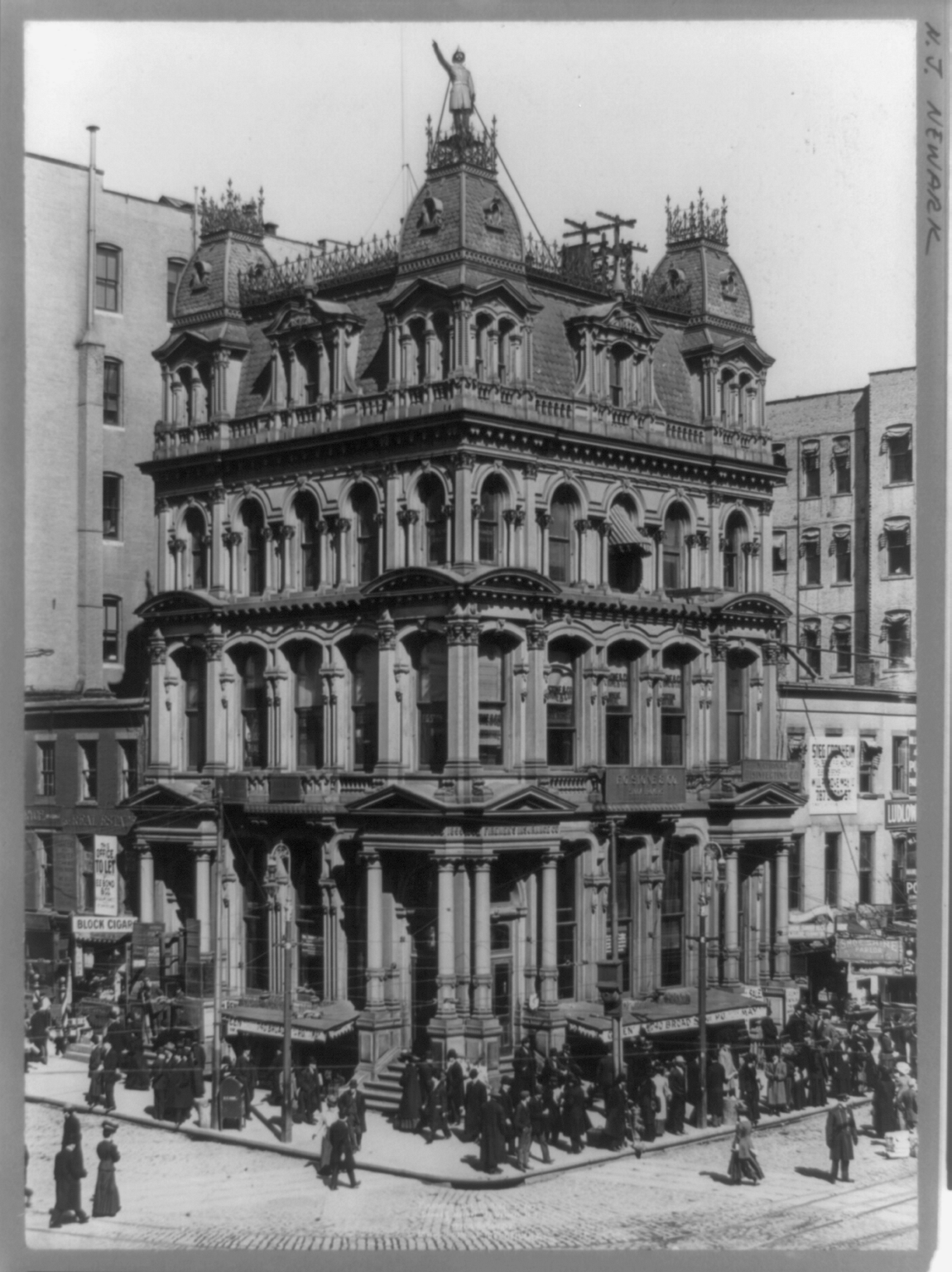
Firemen's Insurance Company Building at Broad and Market streets

An elaborate Victorian Firemen's Insurance Company Building was constructed at Broad and Market Streets circa 1870. It featured a metallic fireman scupluture on one of its mansarded towers. A tower replaced it in 1910.

Firemen's Insurance Building
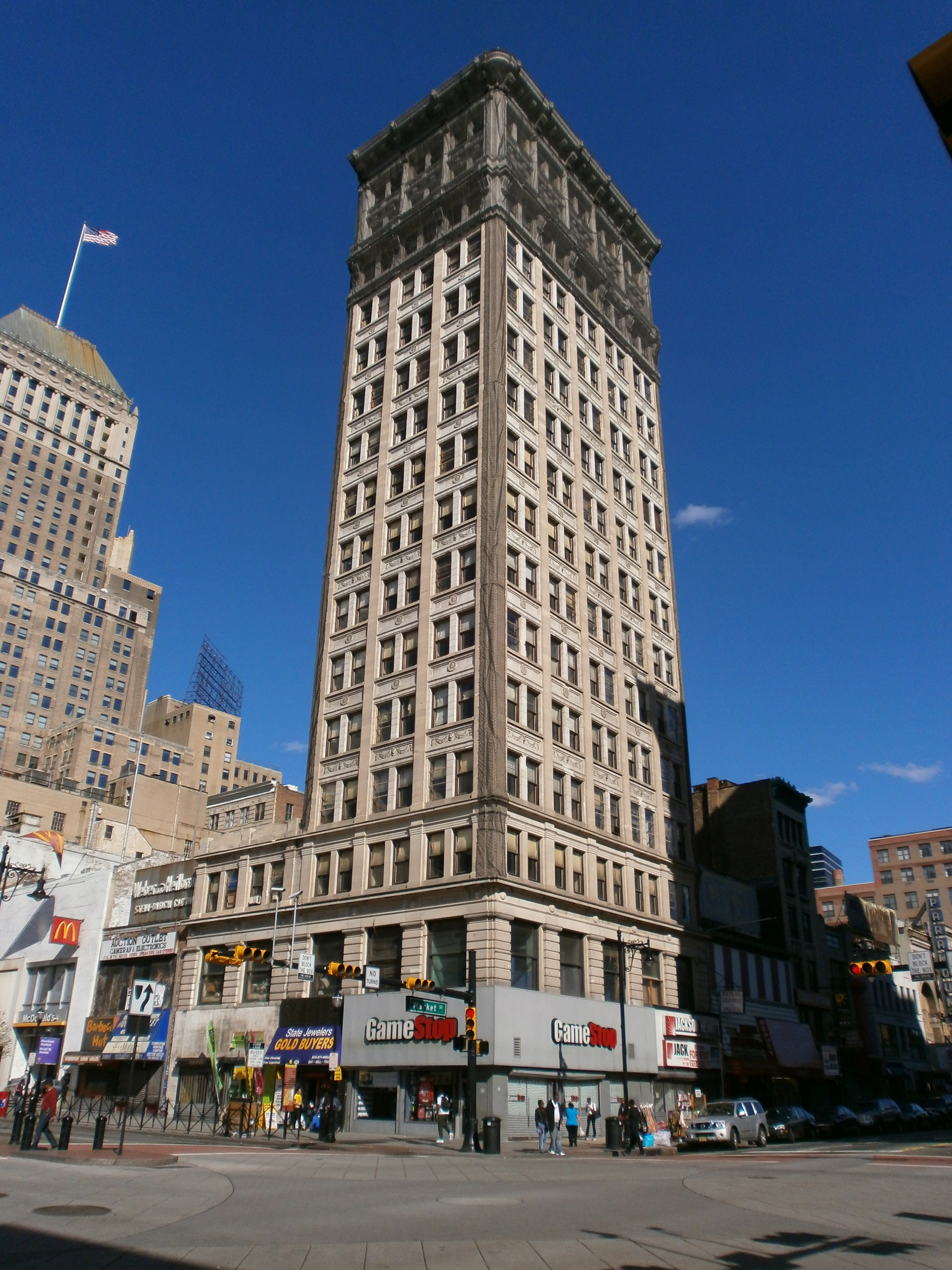

General information
- Type: Office
- Location: Broad and Market Streets; Newark, New Jersey
- Coordinates: 40°44′8.5″N 74°10′18.5″W
- Completed: 1910

Height
- Roof: 205 ft (62 m)

Technical details
- Floor count: 19

Design and construction
- Architect: Marvin, Davis & Turton

The 1910 Firemen's Insurance Building replaced it on the northeast corner of Broad and Market streets, at Four Corners, the spot was once considered one of the busiest intersections in the United States. Completed in 1910, the sixteen-story structure was the first skyscraper in the city, and the tallest in the entire state. The architects were Marvin, Davis & Turton.

== See also ==
- National Register of Historic Places listings in Essex County, New Jersey
- List of tallest buildings in Newark
- Fireman's Insurance Company Building, Washington DC
