= Allan Cullimore =

American academic administrator

3rd President of New Jersey Institute of Technology
- In office 1920–1947
- Preceded by: Daniel Hodgdon
- Succeeded by: Robert W. Van Houten

Personal details
- Born: Allan R. Cullimore
- Education: Massachusetts Institute of Technology

Allan R. Cullimore was an American academic administrator. He was the 3rd President of New Jersey Institute of Technology (NJIT) from 1920 until 1947.

Cullimore was a graduate of Massachusetts Institute of Technology.

Prior to this Cullimore had been a member of the faculty of the University of Toledo and then the first dean of the University of Delaware College of Engineering.

Cullimore was known to have published a book on the use of the slide-rule in 1915.

A number of things at NJIT are named after Cullimore including Cullimore Hall which houses the College of Science and Liberal Arts, the Newark College of Engineering Cullimore Doctoral Fellowship, the Allan R. Cullimore Medal and the Cullimore Award.

== Awards ==
- Benjamin Garner Lamme Award (1951) from the American Society for Engineering Education (ASME).

== Sources ==
Academic offices
Preceded by Daniel Hodgdon	President of New Jersey Institute of Technology; 1920–1947	Succeeded by Robert W. Van Houten
