= Charles A. Colton =

American professor and administrator

Charles Adams Colton (March 29, 1852 – January 1, 1926) was an American academic. He was the first director of Newark Technical School (now the New Jersey Institute of Technology) from 1883 until 1920.

Colton was born in New York City. He graduated from Columbia University's School of Mines in 1873, and from 1873 to 1881 he was assistant to school founder Thomas Egleston. From 1881 to 1883, he was professor of metallurgy and chemistry at Indiana State University.

He helped organized the Newark Technical School in 1881, and was director from 1883 until retiring in 1920.

Colton died in Madison, New Jersey, on New Year's Day, 1926.

Academic offices
Preceded by none	President of New Jersey Institute of Technology; 1881–1918	Succeeded by Daniel Hodgdon
