= Gregory Kriegsmann =

American mathematician (1946–2018)

Gregory Anthony Kriegsmann (1946–2018) was Distinguished Professor of Mathematics and Foundation Chair at New Jersey Institute of Technology’s department of Mathematical Sciences.

== Education ==
Gregory received his BS in Electrical Engineering (1969) from Marquette University, MS in Electrical Engineering (1970), MA in Mathematics (1972) and PhD in Applied Mathematics (1974) from University of California at Los Angeles.

== Honors ==
Gregory was elected as a (first batch) Fellow of the Society for Industrial and Applied Mathematics (SIAM) in 2009.

== Doctoral students ==
According to the Mathematics Genealogy Project, Gregory mentored a total 10 doctoral students (total of 17 descendants) at Northwestern University and New Jersey Institute of Technology including John Pelesko.

== Others ==
He was an Associate Editor of Analysis and Applications, Journal of Engineering Mathematics (JEMA), IMA Journal of Applied Mathematics (IMA) and European Journal of Applied Mathematics.
