= Church of St. Luke and St. Matthew (Brooklyn) =

Church in Brooklyn, New York

- St. Luke's Protestant Episcopal Church
- U.S. National Register of Historic Places
- New York City Landmark
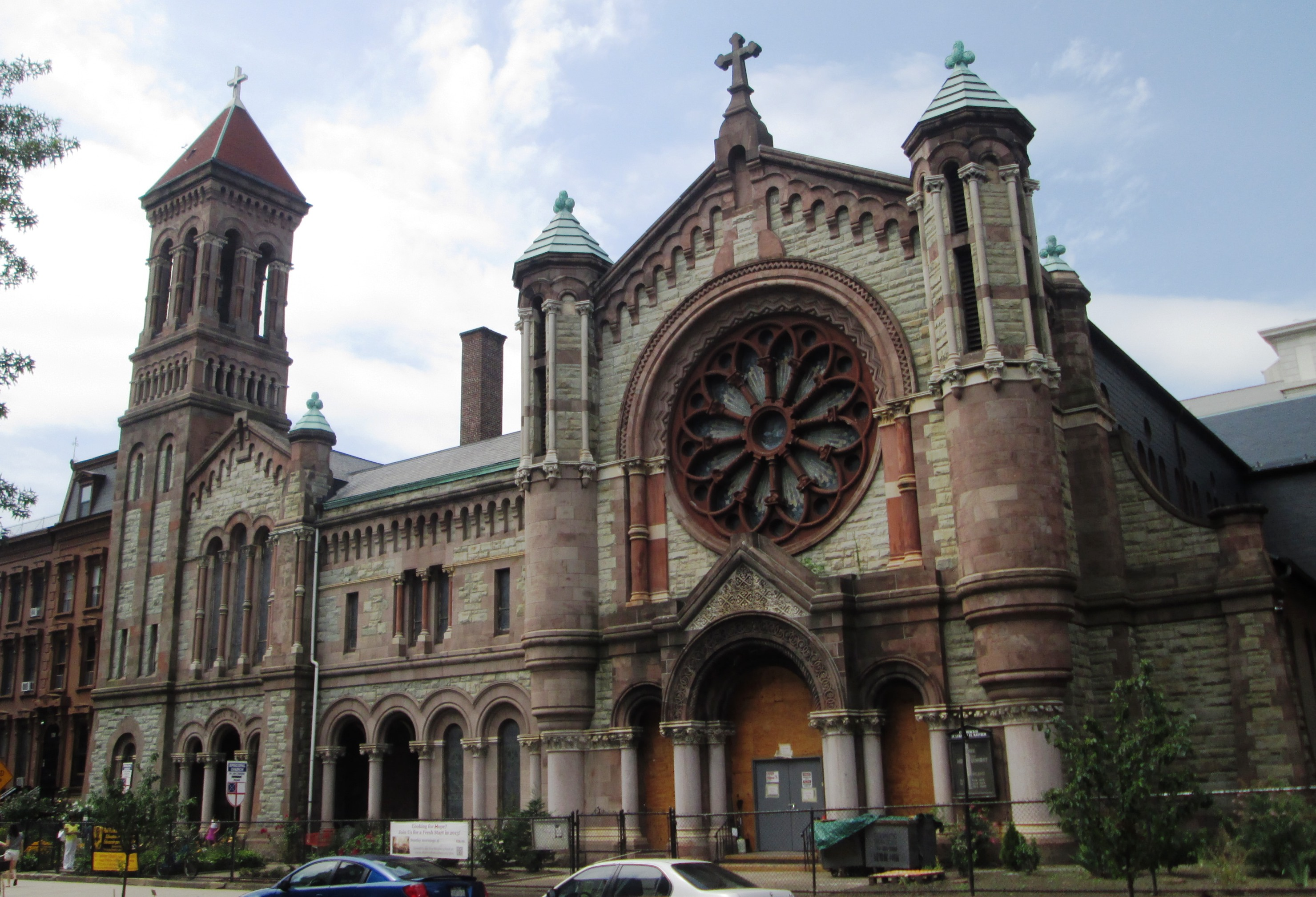
- (2013)

- Location within New York City Location within New York Location within the United States
- Location: 520 Clinton Ave. Brooklyn, New York City
- Coordinates: 40°40′58″N 73°58′1″W
- Built: 1888–1891
- Architect: John Welch
- Architectural style: Romanesque Revival
- NRHP reference No.: 82003364
- NYCL No.: 2014

Significant dates
- Added to NRHP: September 16, 1982
- Designated NYCL: May 12, 1981

The Church of St. Luke and St. Matthew is a historic Episcopal church at 520 Clinton Avenue between Fulton Street and Atlantic Avenue in the Clinton Hill neighborhood of Brooklyn, New York City. This congregation was founded as St. Luke's Protestant Episcopal Church in 1842 following the failure of Trinity Church, which had been consecrated in the same building on June 1, 1835, by Bishop Onderdonk of the Diocese of Long Island. The founding of a church in this location resulted from the expansion of Brooklyn beyond initial European settlement in Brooklyn Heights. The building was constructed on a property consisting of eight city lots donated by George W. Pine.

The congregation's building eventually grew to be the largest in the Episcopal Diocese of Long Island. It merged with the St. Matthew's Episcopal Church in 1943, and the Church of St. Michael and St. Mark in 1993.

== Church building ==
=== 1835 building ===
The original building of St. Luke's Protestant Episcopal Church on Clinton Avenue was constructed in 1835 by Elias Combs, building and hardware merchant, Trinity Church. His widow charged in 1846 that Mr. Combs had not been paid for the construction of this building. She stated that when Trinity Church declared bankruptcy around 1841, and had their mortgage foreclosed on and subsequently dissolved, this allowed the building to be purchased below market value by a new church organization incorporated as "St. Luke's Church" which no longer had any record of debt to Mr. Combs or his widow. Mrs. Combs' accusation was confirmed by other Episcopalian churches in Brooklyn, as well as by a local Brooklyn judge.

St. Luke's Church released a statement in response to this, claiming that there had been no malicious attempt to allow mortgage foreclosure in order to avoid paying the builder, but rather that the entire situation had occurred through mismanagement of Trinity Church. The church also stated that, after purchasing the building, St. Luke's Church had offered Mrs. Combs compensation by giving her one of the best pews in the church as well as a deed to the vault containing her late husband's remains.

A fire was attempted on the building on June 27, 1846 but was detected before any major damage was caused, and a $200 reward was offered by the Mayor of Brooklyn for conviction of the perpetrators. The steeple of the church was struck by lightning in 1856, tearing away woodwork but not causing structural damage.

Major repairs and alterations in 1880 included an enlarged vestibule and new front porch; altered shape of the gallery; and transformation of the old rectory into a parish hall. In 1881, an anonymous donor provided funding for a new chapel and Sunday school building behind the main church edifice, on Vanderbilt Avenue. This new chapel was consecrated in October 1882.

In 1883, the congregation expanded its property holdings along Clinton Avenue, purchasing the house at 520 Clinton Ave, adjacent to its parish building, as a home for the rector.

A major fire in November 1887, following all of this expansion and caused by a defective furnace duct, resulted in the destruction of the organ and altar as well as the chancel of the original church; the original building remained intact in spite of damage, however, and continued to be used for Sunday services while a new Sunday school building and parish hall were built.

=== 1888 building ===
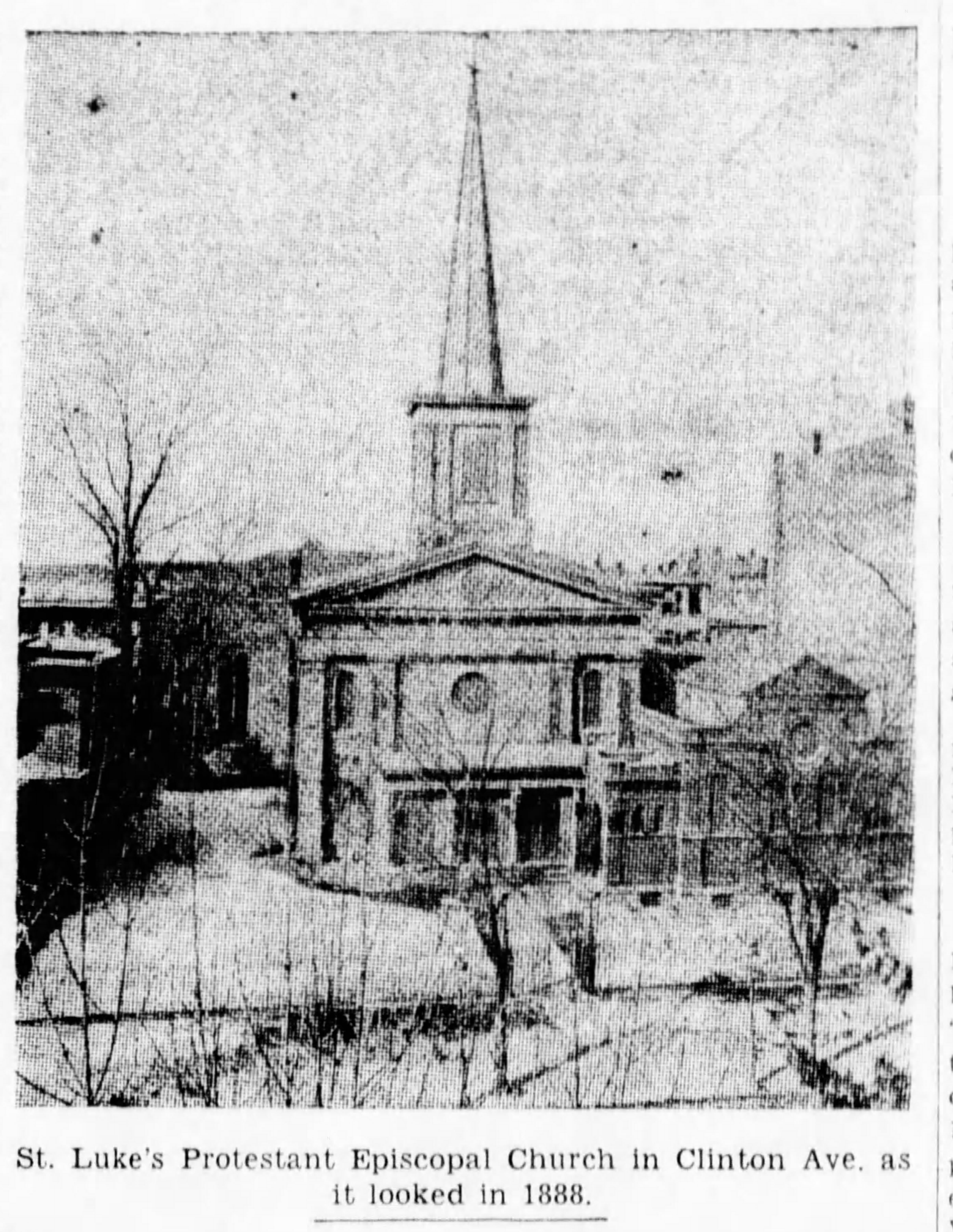
The church building in 1888.

The church's current building at 520 Clinton Avenue in Brooklyn, New York was built in 1888–91 and was designed by John Welch in the Romanesque Revival style. The AIA Guide to New York City describes the building's "great facade" as "Eclecticism gone berserk," while the New York City Landmarks Preservation Commission's Guide to New York City Landmarks calls it "one of the grandest ecclesiastical buildings in Brooklyn." The building was designated a New York City Landmark in 1981 and was added to the National Register of Historic Places in 1982.

The construction of this building, following the 1887 fire, included a new $6,000 organ that was donated by a congregation member and installed in 1889, as well as a new Sunday school building and parish hall. After this initial construction was completed and the church could use these buildings for services, the old stone church which had been damaged in the fire was dismantled and a new building, completed in 1891 and seating 1,500 people, was erected. This construction project resulted in a mortgage that was still $33,000 in 1892, and was paid off by 1896 due to the fundraising efforts of its members. Most of the windows in the nave were also installed in 1896, and were crafted by Tiffany. The rose window was installed in 1890 as a gift from the Sunday school children.

A major fire in 1914 destroyed the interior of this building and caused sections of the roof to collapse, but the outer walls remained intact. Damage was estimated at $300,000.

=== 1915 reconstruction ===
Following the March 1914 fire, the church was reconstructed using the outer walls of the former building, largely along the same design as the original but with an enlarged Sunday school and redesigned parish hall. The building remained under heavy scaffolding for the following year and reopened on September 19, 1915 in time for re-consecration on October 19, 1915. The organ was rebuilt in Hagerston, Maryland, and was designed to be the largest in the city, with four manuals and sixty stops.

=== 2010s fire and restoration ===
In the early morning of December 23, 2012, the building was damaged by a fire. Damage was contained largely to the foyer and entry doors, and the church facade.

Funding from a Department of Environmental Protection Green Infrastructure Grant allowed for 2017 improvements to the front sidewalk area of the church, with installation of a rain garden and permeable pavement project to capture rain runoff. In 2018, the church began work to sell air rights for construction of a nearby residential high rise, with proceeds from the sale paying for facade reconstruction and other repairs and improvements on the aging building in keeping with its Landmark status. Rezoning for this project was approved in 2019.

== Church activities ==
=== Free Church status ===
While the congregation of St. Luke's experienced financial difficulty from its outset from purchasing a building, its debts of over $12,000 were paid off by 1864 and, in 1869, St. Luke's became what was known as a "free church", which is to say that no pews were rented, and anyone could attend for free. St. Luke's was viewed as "a most remarkable example of the success of the free church system".

=== Creation of additional Brooklyn churches ===
In 1883, St. Luke's decided to expand its work by setting up a chapel at another location in Brooklyn; in May 1884, this was established as St. Luke's Chapel in a former Congregational Church building on Pacific Street near Bedford Avenue. St. Luke's Church worked to erect a new building in 1886, and it eventually became an independent parish as St. Bartholomew's Church.

=== Music ===
The church established a choir from very early on; in 1865, they were operating under organist and choirmaster H. Hamilton. In November 1865, women of the church organized a fair to raise funds for the organ. By January 1866, a new organ had been installed and a concert was held with the choir of Trinity Church, New York, to dedicate it. This organ, built by Reuben Midmer & Son of Brooklyn, was at the time one of the largest in the city. It underwent extensive repairs in 1879. The church boasted three choirs—a church choir, chapel choir, and Sunday school choir—by 1885. Charles O. Banks was appointed choirmaster and organist in 1924. While music had been part of parish life before Mr. Banks appointment to this position, he was known for his skill as organist and for the regular series of organ recitals organized by him at St. Luke's. Banks also oversaw the creation of a Choir Alumni association in 1938.

=== Merger of St. Luke's Protestant Episcopal Church with St. Matthew's Episcopal Church ===
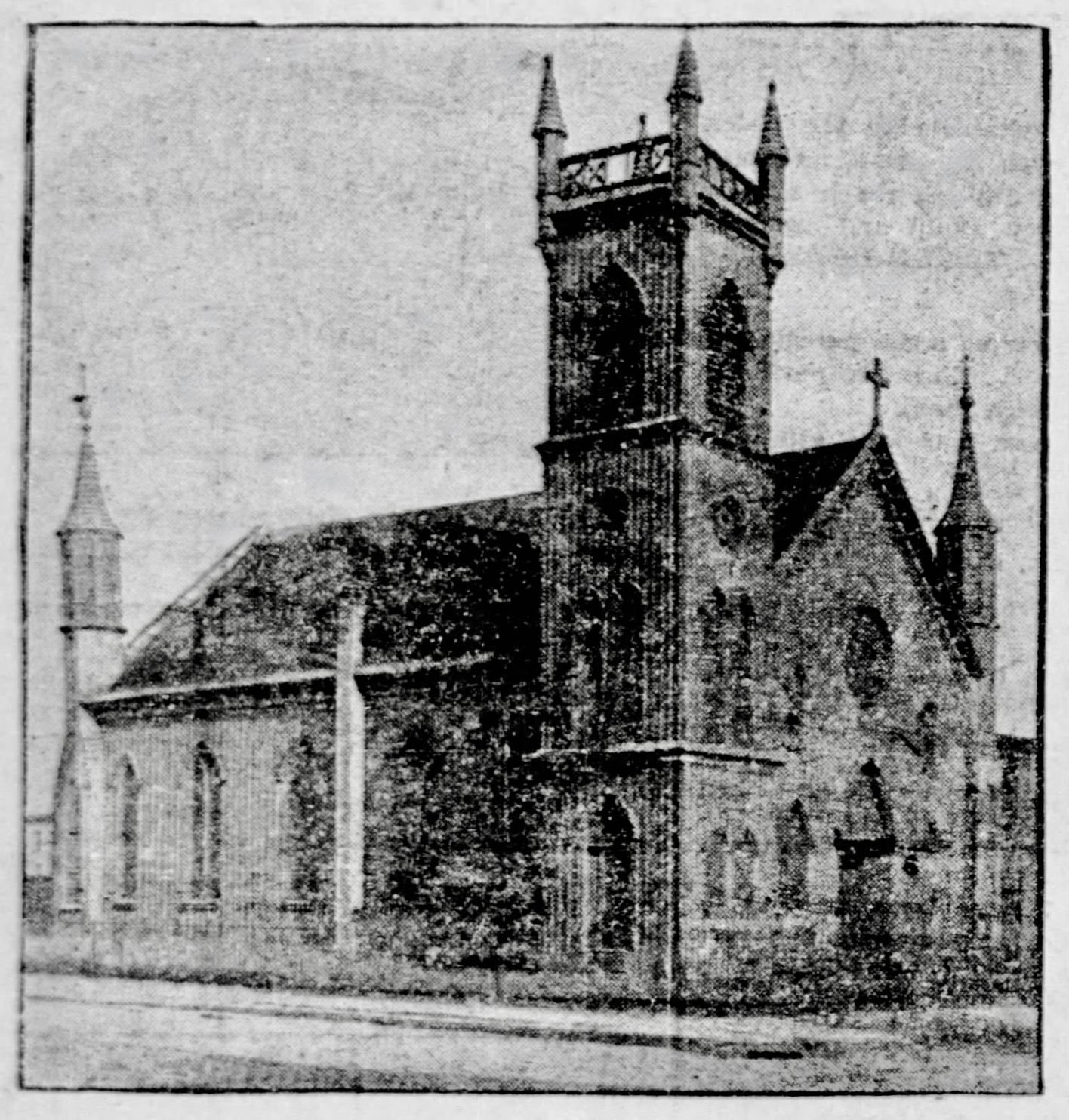
St. Matthew Episcopal Church.

In 1943, St. Luke's Protestant Episcopal Church was merged by order of the New York Supreme Court with St. Matthew's Episcopal Church, originally of Throop Avenue and then, after the merger with the Church of the Epiphany, of Tompkins Ave. at McDonough Street. The merged churches, under the name of the Church of St. Luke and St. Matthew, continued to worship in the building of St. Luke's on Clinton Ave. with Charles Banks as organist. St. Matthew's Church brought a stained glass window of the Apostle Matthew from its previous building, which was installed in the chapel of the present building.

While this merger is credited to decreased attendance and shifting neighborhood populations, St. Matthew's Episcopal Church had also been embroiled in deep public controversy after its former rector, William S. Blackshear, stated explicitly in local press that the church wanted to remain white and was not interested in attracting any people of color from the neighborhood's changing population. While Rev. Blackshear's vestry stood by this opinion, he was deeply criticized by both the bishop of the Diocese as well as by William Pickens and James Weldon Johnson of the National Association for the Advancement of Colored People.

=== Occupy Sandy ===
The Church of St. Luke and St. Matthew building served as Brooklyn headquarters for Occupy Sandy relief efforts, with volunteers using the space to collect and sort material to aid Hurricane Sandy victims.

In 2015, the congregation of the nearby Church of the Redeemer merged with the Church of St. Luke and St. Matthew after the sale of its building.

== Clergy ==
- Rev. Dr. D.V.M. Johnson: 1835–1836
- Dr. Colt
- Dr. Shimeall
- Rev. Dr. J.W. Diller: 1842–1879
- Rev. George R. Van DeWater: 1880–1887
- Rev. Dr. Edward A. Bradley: 1887–1892
- Rev. Dr. Henry C. Swentzel: 1892–1926
- Rev. Rush R. Sloan: 1926 – [1842]
- Rev. John S. Putnam: 1943– ?
- Rev. Harold Courtney: ? –1966
- Rev. William Smith
- Rev. Richard F. Brewer: 1986–2010
- Rev. Michael Sniffen: 2010–2015
- Rev. Christopher Ballard: 2012–2015
- Rev. Julie Hoplamazian: 2017–2018
- Rev. Canon Andrew Durbidge, Priest in Charge: 2019–present

== Notable burials ==
General Gilbert Reid Jr., Brigadier General of the 44th Brigade, was interred in the family vault of the previous church building on June 18, 1845. In 1853, a proposal was made and adopted to immediately cease interment of remains in the church vaults, for public health reasons.

== See also ==
- List of New York City Landmarks
- National Register of Historic Places listings in Kings County, New York
