= South Park Calvary United Presbyterian Church =

Historic church in New Jersey, United States

- U.S. National Register of Historic Places
- New Jersey Register of Historic Places
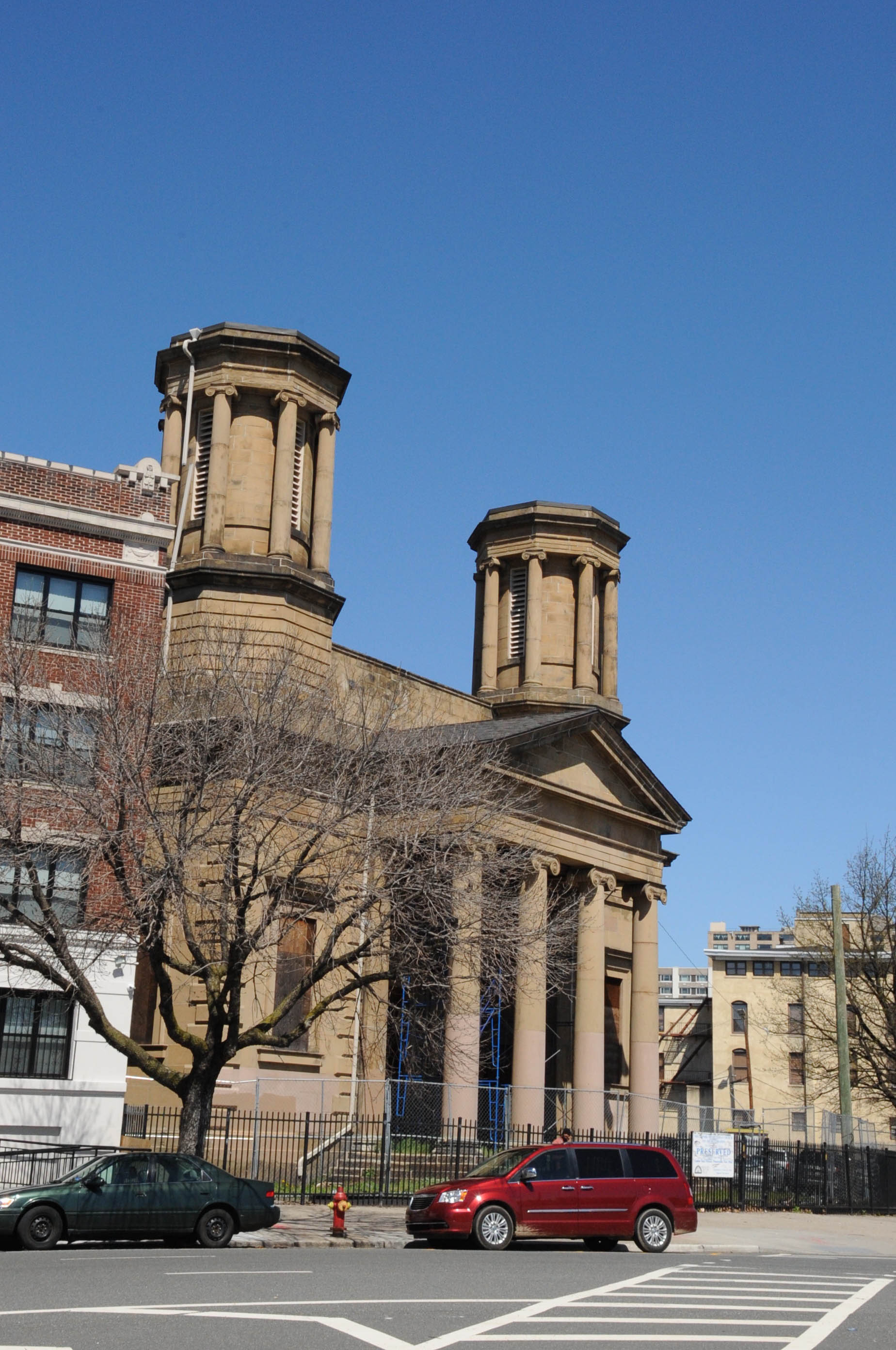

- Location within Essex County, New Jersey Location within New Jersey Location within the United States
- Location: 1035 Broad Street, Newark, New Jersey
- Coordinates: 40°43′39″N 74°10′38″W
- Area: 1 acre (0.40 ha)
- Built: 1853
- Architect: John Welch
- Architectural style: Greek Revival
- NRHP reference No.: 72000784
- NJRHP No.: 1324

Significant dates
- Added to NRHP: December 5, 1972
- Designated NJRHP: April 25, 1972

South Park Calvary United Presbyterian Church is a historic church built in 1853 and located at 1035 Broad Street in the Lincoln Park neighborhood of Newark in Essex County, New Jersey. Only the facade remains, following a 1992 fire. Also known as the South Park Presbyterian Church, it was documented by the Historic American Buildings Survey in 1936. The church was added to the National Register of Historic Places on December 5, 1972, for its significance in architecture.

== History and description ==
The church was designed by architect John Welch, one of the founders of American Institute of Architects, using Greek Revival style. It features a portico in Nova Scotia brownstone with four Ionic columns. The church also features twin circular colonnaded towers.

As of 2019, funding is in place to stabilize the facade and create an outdoor performance space behind it.

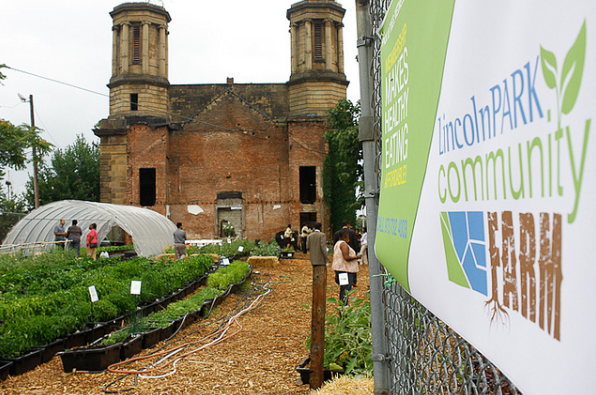
Community garden and site of "The Facade"

== See also ==
- National Register of Historic Places listings in Essex County, New Jersey
