= William Hazell =

American academic administrator (1908–1995)

William Hazell Jr. (July 9, 1908 – January 26, 1995) was the fifth President of the New Jersey Institute of Technology (NJIT) from 1970 until 1975.

== Personal life ==
Hazell was a lifelong resident of Plainfield, New Jersey and was the son of William Sr. and Ella Hazell. He was married to Gwendolyn Jones Bressan and was a deacon and elder in the United Presbyterian Church. He was also a member of the Rotary Club, the Essex Club, and a volunteer for the Boy Scouts of America.

== Early life and education ==
Hazell spent more than 40 years at NJIT (then known as the Newark College of Engineering) as a student, teacher, and administrator. He received his bachelor's degree in Electrical Engineering in 1930. As a student he was a member of the Beta Alpha Theta local fraternity. As an advising alumnus to the organization he was instrumental in the local becoming a Sigma Pi fraternity chapter and he was initiated into the national organization.

== Professional life ==
After graduation Hazell spent his only time away from the college when he worked for the Singer Manufacturing Company from 1930 to 1933.

As a faculty member he was active on the New Jersey Committee on Articulation Between the Colleges and Secondary Schools. In 1950 he was named Dean of Admissions and then in 1959 he was named vice president. He was a member of the committee to Develop Community Colleges and Technical Institutes which led to the establishment of two-year county colleges in 1962. Also, he was a member of the Goals Committee which drafted the first master plan for higher education in the state.

As Dean and Vice President, Hazell oversaw most of the college's operations and planning. He conceived the idea of the Greater Newark Science Fair which began in 1963 and planned the student extracurricular program. In 1954 he started N.C.E.'s young instructors' training program. He was also a member of the Middle States Association of Colleges and Secondary Schools and Omicron Delta Kappa.

== College President ==
As President he oversaw the establishment of the School of Architecture in 1973 and added new degree programs in Engineering Technology; Computer and Information Science; Industrial Administration; and Science, Technology and Society. His tenure oversaw the renaming of the school from the Newark College of Engineering to New Jersey Institute of Technology in 1975. He oversaw the construction of six buildings of campus, one of which (the Student Center), was later named for him. He also helped secure chapters of all major engineering honor societies.

Academic offices
Preceded by Robert W. Van Houten	President of New Jersey Institute of Technology; 1970–1975	Succeeded by Saul K. Fenster
