= St. James' A. M. E. Church (Newark, New Jersey) =

Historic church in New Jersey, United States

St. James' A.M.E. Church
- Saint James AME Church
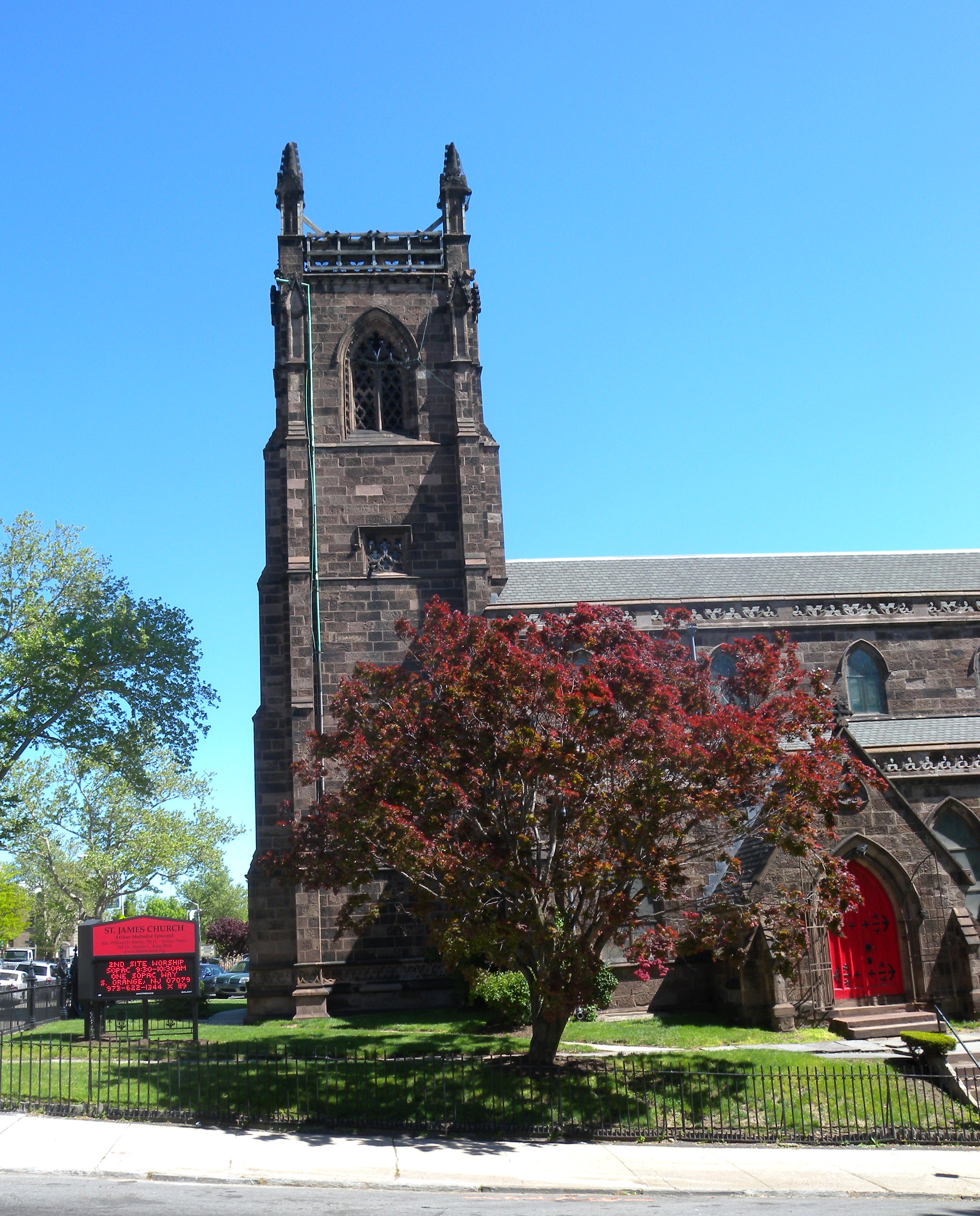

- Location within Essex County, New Jersey
- 40°43′57″N 74°10′52″W
- Location: Newark, NJ
- Country: United States
- Denomination: African Methodist Episcopal
- Previous denomination: Presbyterian
- Website: www.stjamesame.org

History
- Former name(s): Bethel AME Church; High Street Presbyterian Church
- Founded: 1842
- Founder: Reverend C. Birch
- Dedicated: May 17, 1852

Architecture
- Functional status: Active
- Architect(s): John Welch; Carrère and Hastings (addition)
- Architectural type: English Gothic
- Years built: 1850-1852
- Groundbreaking: September 3, 1850
- Construction cost: $40,300

Specifications
- Length: 86 feet (26 m)
- Width: 86 feet (26 m)
- Height: 150 feet (46 m)

Administration
- District: First Episcopal District
- Province: Province of New York and New Jersey

Clergy
- Bishop: Right Reverend Gregory G.M. Ingram
- St. James' A. M. E. Church
- U.S. National Register of Historic Places
- New Jersey Register of Historic Places
- Location: 9/3/1650
- Built: September 3, 1850
- Architects: John Welch; Carrère and Hastings (addition)
- Architectural style: English Gothic
- NRHP reference No.: 72000787
- NJRHP No.: 871

Significant dates
- Designated: October 18, 1972
- Designated NJRHP: March 17, 1972

St. James' A.M.E. Church is a historic church located at High and Court Streets in Newark, New Jersey. Built in 1850 by architect John Welch and dedicated in 1854, it was originally called the High Street Presbyterian Church until 1926, when it was briefly disbanded. It was re-established as Bethel AME Church before being renamed Saint James' AME Church.

== History ==
Incorporated in 1842, and located on Green Street in Newark, it was formed under Rev. C. Birch, however, it was briefly disbanded in 1926 then re-established as Saint James AME Church. Church services were held in various places before settling at 94 Union Street. In January 1945, the church moved to its present building on High Street (now Martin Luther King Boulevard). Prior to the acquisition of the church on Union Street, the congregation worshipped at various locations. The present church had been the Old High Street Presbyterian Church.

In August of that same year, the first marriage in Saint James at the new location on High Street, was that of the late Mr. John C. Reynolds and Mrs. Alberta Reynolds., and to this union, three daughters and one son were born. James Ballard was a dedicated worker as the church sexton and custodian for 35 years before retiring in 1980. A roster lists the names of all the prior pastors to lead Saint James. However, only one name on that list had the honor of being elected and consecrated the 105th Bishop of the AME Church. Bishop Vernon Randolph Byrd was elected from the pulpit of Saint James in 1984.

Saint James was placed on the New Jersey and National Registers of Historic Places in 1972. By gaining landmark status and eligibility for monies designated for historic preservation, the church received a substantial grant of $1.3 million in 2000 awarded by the New Jersey Historic Trust. During the beautification work, services were held at nearby Arts High School for about nine months or so.

== Architecture ==
The church was built to represent a florid Gothic structure in the pointed style of the 14th century built wholly stone from the Little Falls by renowned architect John Welch. It is said to be one of his first projects upon coming to the United States. The interior presents a spacious and cheerful room, without galleries, relieved of any sepulchral effect by the unobtrusively rich stained glass windows, which temper the atmosphere into a soft mellow tone, without excluding too much light. The pews are invitingly arranged and cushioned with red, the carpets being of the same general tone. The pulpit is of elaborately carved oak, the wood work of the organ loft over the front vestibule and seats being of the same material. In the evening it is lighted with gas from side brackets, and gilt candelabra, with five burners each, rising at convenient intervals between the pews.

The church is designed in a rectangular shape with the placement of the tower, piers and chancel in a style similar to the English fourteenth century decorative period. The building is constructed entirely of a hand-cut stone in an approximate facsimile of a Flemish bond. A centrally located tower on the facade is Norman in style with some early English elements. The building is on an east-west axis and has its front doors on a level with the sidewalk. The nave and rear addition reach back and down the steep hill so that the building appears to be quite large. The interior of the church, however, is not very large.

The addition was a rear lecture hall built in 1890, beginning at the end of the side walls. Even though the rear building appears to be a large transept, it is in fact a separate building. The original part of the building extends from the front tower to the rear wall of the nave which serves as a central pulpit area. The entire rear of the building is in effect a separate building and contains rooms used for offices with a large lecture room in the upper stories that run at a high angle to the church nave. This building is constructed of brick and is faced with a brownstone similar to those found in the facade. Entrance to the building is provided from the nave and through separate outside doors. A cornerstone on the southeast corner bears the date 1890. A real attempt was made to use a facing stone like that found in the facade so that no real contrast exists.

== See also ==
- National Register of Historic Places listings in Essex County, New Jersey
