= Robert Van Houten =

American academic administrator (1905–1986)

Dr. Robert W. Van Houten (January 31, 1905–January, 1986, class of 1930) was the 4th President of New Jersey Institute of Technology (NJIT) from 1947 until 1970.

== Personal life ==
Van Houten was born in Newark, New Jersey to Wilford and Ellen Van Houten. He attended public schools as a child. He would have a wife named Martha and two sons, James W. and Donald R.

== Education ==
Robert graduated from the New Jersey Normal School of Newark, New Jersey in 1924. (New Jersey Normal School is the old name of Kean University) He studied at Newark College of Engineering (NCE which is the old name of New Jersey Institute of Technology) from 1926 earning his master's and graduated with a PhD in Civil Engineering in 1930. He received his degree with highest academic honors and was a member of Beta Alpha Theta local fraternity. When the local became a chapter of Sigma Pi fraternity he was initiated into the national organization.

== Career ==
After graduating from high school in 1924, Robert taught for two years in the public schools of Essex Fells and Roseland. It was there where he found his love for teaching.

While pursuing for his BS degree at NCE, he also worked and gained valuable engineering experience during the summers in the engineer's office at Irvington, New Jersey, and later with A. C. Widsor Construction Co., H. R. Goeller, Inc., and Wallace and Tiernan Company in Belleville.

Allan R. Cullimore, the 3rd President of NCE, saw something in Robert and offered him an Instructorship in Mathematics during his senior year with small pay and no promises.

Robert served successively at Newark College of Engineering as an Instructor, Assistant Professor, Associate Professor, Assistant to the President, Assistant Dean, Dean, Acting President, President before retiring as President Emeritus in 1970.

== Notable accomplishments as President of NJIT from 1947 till 1970 ==
- Responsible the state-approved construction for Cullimore Hall (1958), reconstruction of Weston Hall (1960) and constructions of several other buildings including Tiernan Hall (1966).
- Received the first PhD degree from NJIT in 1964.
- Started the Computer Science Department in 1969.

== Notable Appointments Held ==
- Vice-chairman of the American Council on Education.
- President of the Association of Urban Universities.
- President of the New Jersey Association of Colleges and Universities.
- President of the American Society for Engineering Education (ASEE).
- Chairman of the New Jersey Education Association.
- Chairman of the Boy Scouts of America.
- Chairman of the New Jersey State Commission on Civil Rights.
- Director of the New Jersey Bell Telephone Company.

== Honors and awards ==
- Highest Academic Honors of his graduating class (BSCE) in 1930.
- Newark College of Engineering 's Allan R. Cullimore Medal (1971).

== Honorary Degrees Received ==
- Honorary Doctor of Engineering degree by Stevens Institute of Technology (1955).
- Honorary Doctor of Science degree by Rider College (Rider University) (1956).
- Honorary Doctor of Science degree by Clarkson College of Technology (Clarkson University) (1956).
- Honorary Doctor of Letters degree by Newark State College (Kean College) (1961).
- Honorary Doctor of Laws degree by Seton Hall University (1966).
- Honorary Doctor of Engineering by Newark College of Engineering (New Jersey Institute of Technology) (1970).

== Noteworthy Fact/s ==
- The NJIT library was named as the Van Houten Library in honor of him.

Academic offices
Preceded by Allan R. Cullimore	President of New Jersey Institute of Technology; 1947–1970	Succeeded by William Hazell, Jr.
