= NJIT Capstone Program =

The Capstone Program is a combination of senior-level courses offered to students at the New Jersey Institute of Technology under NJIT’s College of Computing Sciences, which offers the Computer Science, Information Systems, and Information Technology majors. The course can also be taken as an elective by students from other disciplines at the school, such as Management, Engineering, or Architecture.

== History ==
The NJIT Capstone Program was founded in the Fall 2002 semester, by Professor Osama Eljabiri, as a way to instill students with valuable real-world work experience, to which they may not yet have been exposed. Professor Eljabiri's plan for the Capstone Program involved the submission of IT, IS, or CS-related projects by local corporate sponsors from the Newark, NJ area. To assist with the program's coordination, Professor Eljabiri put together an advisory board made up of past students, sponsors, and other colleagues (not necessarily from NJIT).

As a national endorsement for the success of the Capstone Program and its impact on students' education, Carnegie Foundation named Osama Eljabiri NJ Professor of the Year for the year 2007.

== Expansion ==
Since its inception, the Capstone Program has continuously expanded, both in its scope and its student base. After a few successful semesters as an undergraduate course, the Capstone Program was offered to graduate students in the CS, IS, and IT disciplines. It then expanded down. The Professor developed a related program for high school students under the name "Real World Connections". The high school program is composed of three sections:

- Beginners, nicknamed the Survivors group, for freshman-sophomore level high school students
- Intermediate, or Connections 1 group, for second-year program veterans
- Advanced, or Connections 2 group, for third-year program veterans or freshman at the college level

The "Real World Connections" program was developed to help younger students get a head start in the science and technology field, and is run by the Professor and members of the college-level capstone course. Students from the graduate and undergraduate classes serve as mentors and advisors for the high school program.

The Fall semester of 2007 saw the program expand yet again, this time reaching out to students at the junior high school level.

In addition to expanding its student base, Professor Eljabiri has consistently added to the types of projects that students can choose for their semester's work:

- Industry-sponsored track: oldest and most popular track. Features projects provided by corporate/industry sponsors
- University-sponsored track: projects provided by NJIT departments or colleges
- Entrepreneurship track: students work on an entrepreneurial idea throughout the semester, taking the necessary steps to start their own business
- Teaching and Advising Track: open to only four (4) students per semester, students plan, develop, and teach technical workshops to train and advise their peers in the Capstone Program as well as the Real World Connections program
- Strategic Management Track (Capstone CEO's): a brand new track for the managers of the managers. Students help oversee the Capstone Program in its entirety, guide and help teams and individuals throughout the semester, train project managers, manage relationships with sponsors, advisors, and other students, and plan & coordinate key events. Open to only two (2) students per semester.

== Sponsors ==
Following is a brief list of the many stakeholders that have participated in the Capstone Program over the years (in no particular order):

- CyberExtruder
- BanDeMar Networks, LLC.
- Newark Beth Israel Medical Center
- Meridian Health Systems
- CitiGroup
- CBS News
- Morpholytics, LLC.
- Creative Technology Partners, Inc.
- SAFE Communications, Inc.
- IMS Health
- Evident Software
- Edentify, Inc.
- Department of the U.S. Army
- Lyndhurst Police Emergency Squad
- Johnson & Johnson
- NJ Transit
- Pfizer, Inc.
- Signature Plus Jewelry, LLC.
- NJ Office of Homeland Security
- Distribution Solutions, Inc.
- Garden State Apartments / Jersey Apartments, LLC.
- Velero Group, LLC.
- PhishTrain
