= Eberhardt Hall, New Jersey Institute of Technology =

- Newark Orphan Asylum
- U.S. National Register of Historic Places
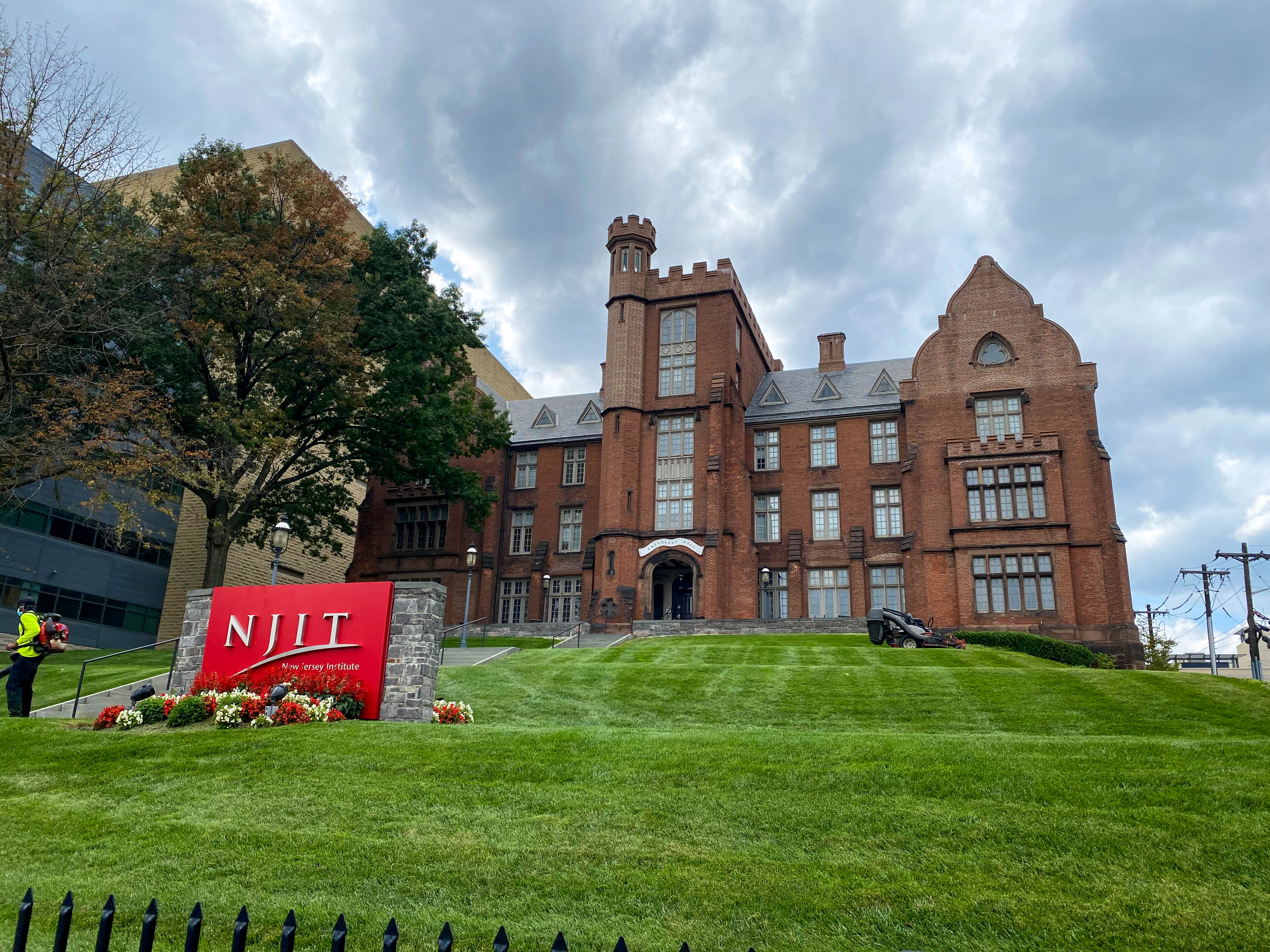
- Eberhardt Hall

- Location within Essex County, New Jersey Location within New Jersey Location within the United States
- Location: 323 Martin Luther King Jr. Blvd, Newark, New Jersey
- Coordinates: 40°44′34″N 74°10′37″W
- Built: 1857
- Architects: John Welch; Thomas A. Roberts
- Architectural style: Victorian, Elizabethan Gothic
- NRHP reference No.: 73001094
- Added to NRHP: June 19, 1973

Eberhardt Hall, originally the Newark Orphan Asylum, is the oldest building at the New Jersey Institute of Technology (NJIT). It is located at 323 Martin Luther King Jr. Blvd. (formerly High Street), in the University Heights section of Newark, Essex County, New Jersey, United States. Built in 1856-57 its original purpose was to serve as a home for Newark's orphans. Eberhardt Hall is listed in the National Register of Historic Places and is a beautiful example of 19th-century Gothic Victorian architecture, in conjunction with 15th- and 16th-century castle design.

== History ==
The castle-like building was designed by John Welch, an experienced church architect and one of the founders of American Institute of Architects. It is said to be that the building had the most advanced construction of the time. It included some modern day amenities such as hot and cold water, gaslight, and even an early fire extinguishing system. By 1947 the building was no longer used for its original purpose. Thereafter, Newark College of Engineering - subsequently New Jersey Institute of Technology - acquired the building for $58,000. In 1948, the board closed the deal with another $40,000 which included the closing and renovation.

=== Frederick Eberhardt ===
The board of trustees that served during 1947 named the building in honor of Frederick Eberhardt, who served on the Newark College of Engineering Board of Trustees from 1910 until his death in 1946.

== Restoration ==
The building has served many purposes through the years. In the early 2000s, NJIT embarked on a quest to bring the 21st century edge to the campus. This included the restoration of Eberhardt Hall in 2005 to serve as the NJIT Alumni Center, and to provide space for the NJIT Club for dining and receptions and for some administrative offices. The restoration cost 13 million dollars, of which NJIT settled $7 million and the State of New Jersey contributed the remaining $6 million. The architect firm, Cody Eckert & Associates spearheaded the project.

=== Exterior ===
Eberhardt Hall currently stands three stories high with a footprint of 35,000 square feet (3,300 m^{2}). Precise original construction has left the exterior of the building almost unaltered. It was recreated to replicate the original building from the 19th century.

=== Interior ===
Much of the interior had been modified throughout the early years. The only major piece of structure that is still intact is the grand staircase. The interior has been restored to what it might have looked like in the Victorian era, with electrified gaslight fixtures, Victorian patterned wallpaper, carpeting, and wood trim. The building houses a central lobby, board room, dining room and meeting rooms. Outside, there is a beautiful gated green and bluestone forecourt.

== Award ==
The restoration of Eberhardt Hall received the 2006 Donald T. Dust Recognition Award, from the Newark Preservation and Landmarks Committee on February 28, 2006. It is the highest annual honor from the Newark Preservation and Landmarks Committee.

== See also ==
- National Register of Historic Places listings in Essex County, New Jersey
