= NJIT School of Management =

Business school in Newark, New Jersey

Coordinates: 40.742004°N 74.178390°W

New Jersey Institute of Technology School of Management
- Type: Public
- Established: 1988
- Dean: Oya Tukel
- Location: Newark, New Jersey, United States
- Campus: Newark
- Website: management.njit.edu

The Martin Tuchman School of Management is the business school of New Jersey Institute of Technology (NJIT), in Newark, New Jersey.

== History ==
The Martin Tuchman School of Management was established in 1988 as the School of Industrial Management in an effort to continue expanding the New Jersey Institute of Technology. The school offers a bachelors, MBA, executive MBA, and PhD degree. It reached typical enrollment of approximately 700 students which has remained flat since. On March 3, 2016, the School of Management was rechristened as the Martin Tuchman School of Management after distinguished alumnus Martin Tuchman, a philanthropist and entrepreneur who earned his bachelor's degree in mechanical engineering in 1962 and went on to a career of establishing successful companies such as Kingstone Capital V and the Tuchman Foundation. The NJIT School of Management was accredited by the AACSB International in 1997.

== Rankings ==
New Jersey Institute of Technology is ranked No. 99 in Best Business Schools. According to the Princeton Review, the Martin Tuchman School of Management is ranked 207th out of 780 business schools nationwide. EduUniversal has awarded the School of Management with 3 palmes The NJIT's Martin Tuchman School of Management is accredited by The AACSB.

== Programs ==
=== Undergraduate ===
The Bachelors of Science in Business program requires students to complete 124 credits of coursework. Concentration areas include Accounting, Management, Information Systems, Marketing, Finance, International Business, and Innovation and Entrepreneurship. The curriculum includes a core of fundamental business knowledge, with courses in accounting, finance, marketing, law and ethics, and strategic management. Students choose a concentration before their junior year, and must complete 15 credits in that chosen field. The Martin Tuchman School of Management also offers a minor in Business and a minor in Innovation and Entrepreneurship. The Business minor is open to all majors outside of business and requires 18 credits of courses in fundamental business and management knowledge. Innovation and Entrepreneurship minor requires 18 credits and includes courses in fundamental business along with new venture management and financing.

=== Graduate ===
==== Master's ====
The Master of Science in Management is a 30-credit program that prepares students for managerial roles. The program offers three concentrations; Global Project Management, Business Analytics, and Web Systems and Media. The program is designed to accommodate a wide range of student schedules, and can be completed in full or part-time semesters. The department offers many courses in evenings, weekends, and online to accommodate working schedules. Admission requirements for this program include; earned a bachelor's degree and achieve acceptable scores on the Graduate Management Admissions Test (GMAT) or GRE. Students who earned a bachelor's degree with minimum GPA of 2.8, master's degree, or PHD degree, may waive the GMAT/GRE. The Masters of Business Administration degree requires 48 credits to complete. The degree offers concentrations in; finance, healthcare management, innovation and entrepreneurship, marketing, management information systems, and a custom concentration that can be discussed with an academic adviser. The goal of this program is to educate students on facing challenges in an increasingly complex and technologically driven business environment. The degree can be completed full-time or part-time. Admissions requirements are the same as MSM degree. The department also offers a fully online MBA program. This is a 48-credit degree offered in eight 15-week semesters. The program offers specializations in management information systems, marketing, and finance. Two graduate certificates are also offered online: management essential, and management of technology. The last master's degree option is the Executive MBA Program. The executive MBA program intended for accomplished and high potential professionals, managers, and entrepreneurs. It is a 16-month and 48-credit accelerated program that is online. Throughout the program, there are 52-day (Friday and Saturday) immersion/integration “boot camps”. They focus on the programs four critical themes: transformation of organizations; analytics and the digital economy; STEM, innovation, and business; and strategic management. During the sessions, students participate in business roundtable discussions, network with peers and EMBA alumni. The total cost for the program is $67,000 which includes fees, books, and the 5 “boot camps”.

==== PHD ====
The last degree offered by the department is a PhD in Business Data Science. The program was launched in the fall of 2016 and aims to educate the next generation of data scientists for business and management. For admission, applicants are required to have a bachelor's degree with a minimum GPA of 3.0/4.0 and submit GRE or GMAT scores. The program requires students to maintain a 3.0 GPA for graduation.

== Research ==
The Martin Tuchman School of Management also houses a research center and a laboratory. The Leir Center for Financial Bubble Research was established inside the School of Management with support from the Ridgefield and Leir Foundations. The goal of the center is to understand through quantitative and qualitative research how a financial bubble can be identified including its stages of development and what policies can best manage its impacts. The center researches what is a bubble and what it is not.

== Laboratories ==
Ray Cassetta Financial Analysis Lab is located on the first floor of the Martin Tuchman School of Management building. It is a place for NJIT students and faculty to learn about using the Bloomburg terminal. The Bloomberg terminal is widely utilized in the financial industry. It monitors and studies security prices across all major asset classes and place electronic trades. It can send messages and emails to other terminal users, and construct financial data sets for research and development purposes. The lab offers getting started guides and tutorials on how to use the terminal.

== Clubs ==
Students in The Martin Tuchman School of Management can join a variety of academic clubs, including the Business club, NJIT investment club, and Accounting club. The business club helps members become more familiar with the business culture and promote professional development. The club helps members to network with each other and with future employers. The investment club is a student-run association that aims to educate its members about investing in the stock market and for the long term. Every semester the investing club teaches Investing 101, which is an introductory course to the markets and principles of investing. The accounting club provides speakers on accounting topics and helps members network.
