= John Pelesko =

American mathematician

John A. Pelesko (born c. 1968) is an American mathematician and educator. In August 2026 he was appointed interim president of New Jersey Institute of Technology, (NJIT) upon the retirement of Teik C Lim. Previously, he served as provost and senior vice president for academic affairs at the institution. Prior to that, he was Dean of the College of Arts and Sciences at the University of Delaware and a Professor in the Department of Mathematical Sciences.

== Biography ==
John grew up in Roselle, New Jersey, and attended Roselle Catholic High School from which he graduated in 1986. Pelesko graduated with a B.S. in pure mathematics with honors from University of Massachusetts Boston in 1992. He received his Ph.D. from the New Jersey Institute of Technology in 1997 where he was a student of Gregory Kriegsmann.

Pelesko taught at California Institute of Technology as an Instructor (1997 to 1999), at Georgia Institute of Technology as an Assistant Professor (1999 to 2002) before settling down at University of Delaware as an Assistant Professor (2002), and most recently as a Full Professor. In March of 2023 Dr. Pelesko returned to NJIT as Provost and senior academic officer.

Pelesko's mathematical interests include the development and application of mathematical methods to problems arising in the microwave heating of ceramics, electron beam welding, diffusion in polymers, solidification thermomechanics, thermoelastic stability and shock dynamics. Currently, his research is focused upon the mathematical modeling of microelectromechanical systems (MEMS) and nanoelectromechanical systems (NEMS). In addition to his area of focus, he has interests and contributions in other areas, including integer sequences, tiling problems, and physics education.

Pelesko in one of the two professors that were involved in the MEC Lab at the University of Delaware, a lab for running physical experiments and computations related to applied mathematics.

== Selected publications ==
- Pelesko, M. Cesky, S. Huertas: "Lenz's law and dimensional analysis". American Journal of Physics, Vol. 73, No. 1 pp. 37–39 (Jan 2005)
- "Generalizing the Conway-Hofstadter $10,000 Sequence". Journal of Integer Sequences, Vol. 7, Article 04.3.5 (2004)
- Pelesko, John (2003). Modeling MEMS and NEMS. Chapman & Hall / CRC Press. ISBN 1-58488-306-5.
- Pelesko, John (2007). Self Assembly: The Science of Things That Put Themselves Together. Chapman & Hall / CRC Press. ISBN 978-1-58488-687-7.
