= John Welch (architect) =

American architect

- Born: March 13, 1825; Scotland
- Died: November 21, 1894 (aged 69); Brooklyn, New York
- Occupation: Architect

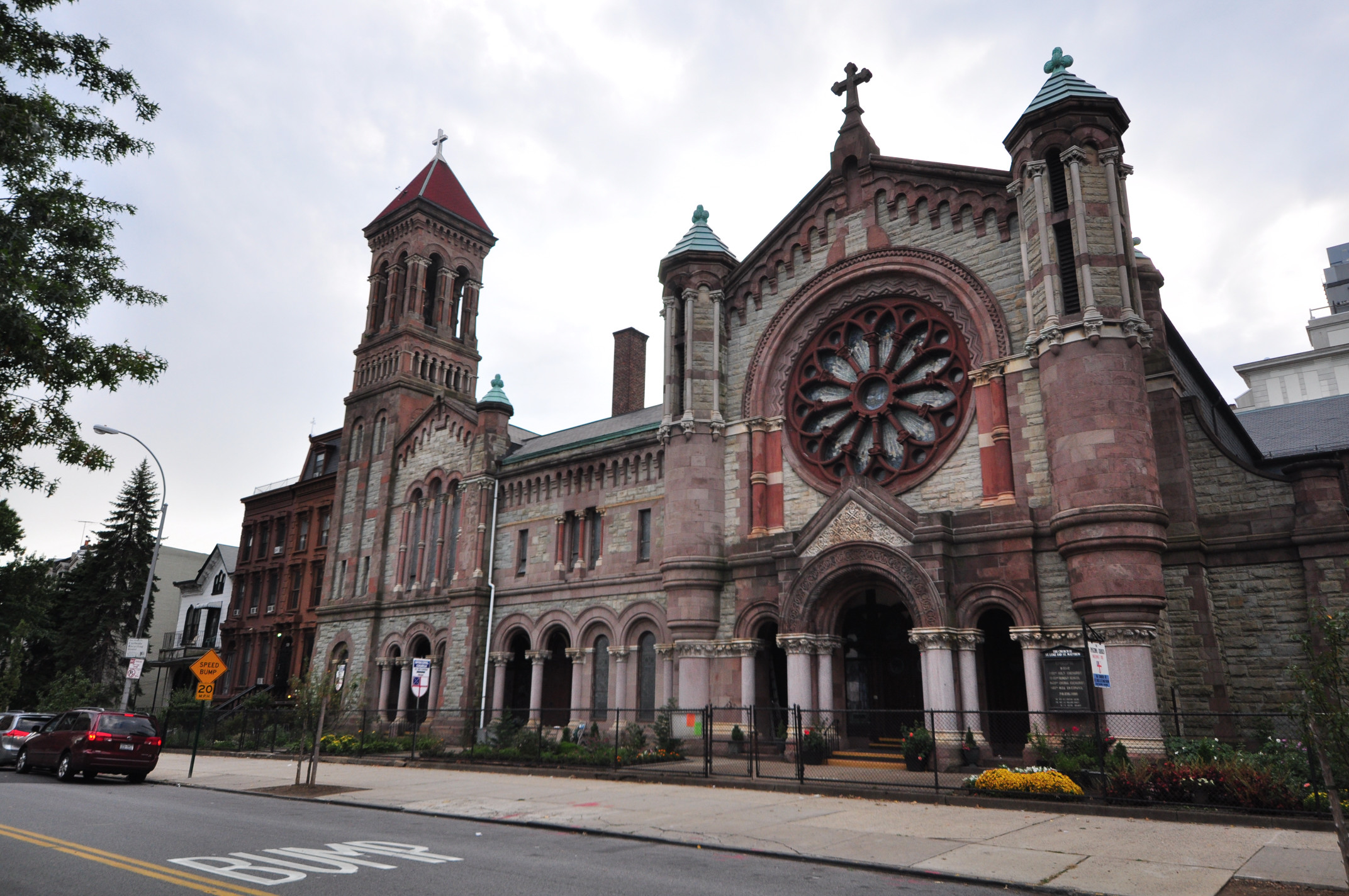
The Episcopal Church of St. Luke and St. Matthew in Brooklyn, completed in 1891, was one of John Welch's last works.

John Welch (1825-1894) was a Scottish-born American architect of Brooklyn, New York, who designed numerous churches. He was one of the founders of American Institute of Architects.

== Life and career ==
John Welch was born March 13, 1825, in Scotland, and was trained in architecture in Scotland and England. In 1849 he came to the United States, initially settling in Newark, New Jersey, where he opened his first office. Welch soon became known as an architect of churches, and in 1857 was among those invited by Richard Upjohn to form the American Institute of Architects. By 1862 Welch had relocated to Brooklyn, where he would live for the rest of his life. Welch practiced architecture almost until his death, though he fell on hard times, financially, in the early 1890s and was obligated to work odd jobs for the last period of his life.

== Personal life ==
John Welch died November 21, 1894, while eating dinner in a Brooklyn restaurant. He was survived by his wife. Several notices of his death noted that he had been estranged from his family for several years and lived alone.

== Legacy ==
The St. Luke's Protestant Episcopal Church in Brooklyn, designed and built by Welch during 1888–89, has been said to be "among the largest and finest of nineteenth-century ecclesiastical structures in New York City". The second Brooklyn Tabernacle, which Welch designed for Thomas De Witt Talmage, was one of the first auditorium plan churches in the United States, a method of church design popularized by others as the Akron Plan.

A number of his works are listed on the National Register of Historic Places.

== Works ==
- High Street Presbyterian Church (former), (Note: Since 1945 this building has been home to St. James' A. M. E. Church.) 588 Dr Martin Luther King Jr Blvd, Newark, New Jersey (1850–52, NRHP 1972)
- South Park Calvary United Presbyterian Church, 1035 Broad St, Newark, New Jersey (1853, NRHP 1972)
- St. Paul M. E. Church, Newark, New Jersey (1853–54, demolished)
- R. C. Cathedral of St. Paul, Grant St and Fifth Ave, Pittsburgh, Pennsylvania (1855, demolished)
- Newark Orphan Asylum (former), (Note: Now Eberhardt Hall, New Jersey Institute of Technology.) 323 Dr Martin Luther King Jr Blvd, Newark, New Jersey (1856–57, NRHP 1973)
- 61st Street M. E. Church, 223 E 61st St, New York City (1873, demolished)
- Brooklyn Tabernacle, Schermerhorn St, Brooklyn, New York (1873–74, burned 1889)
- Peoples' Temple, 187 Columbus Ave, Boston, Massachusetts (1878, demolished)
- Centenary Queen Square United Church, 95 Wentworth St, Saint John, New Brunswick, Canada (1878–82, demolished 2019)
- 18th Street M. E. Church (former), 224 18th St, Brooklyn, New York (1882–83)
- Janes M. E. Church, 660 Monroe St, Brooklyn, New York (1883, partially burned 1984)
- First Baptist Church of Williamsburg, 103 Lee Ave, Brooklyn, New York (1884–85, demolished 2001)
- Episcopal Church of St. Luke and St. Matthew, 520 Clinton Ave, Brooklyn, New York (1888–91, NRHP 1982)
- Sands Street Memorial M. E. Church, 70 Clark St, Brooklyn, New York (1889–91)
- All Saints Episcopal Church, 286-288 Seventh Ave, Brooklyn, New York (1892–93)

== Gallery of works ==
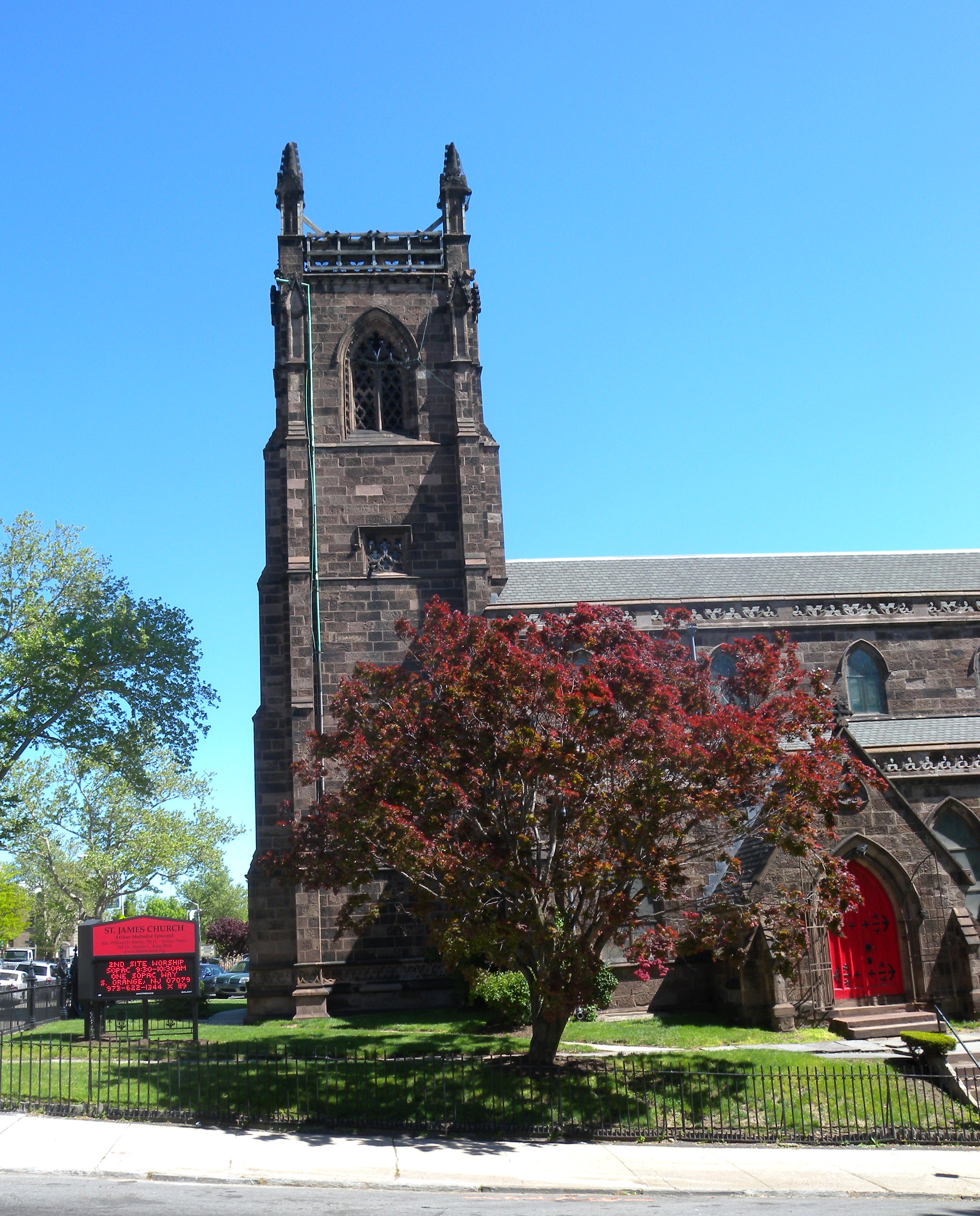
High Street Presbyterian Church, Newark, New Jersey, 1850-52.

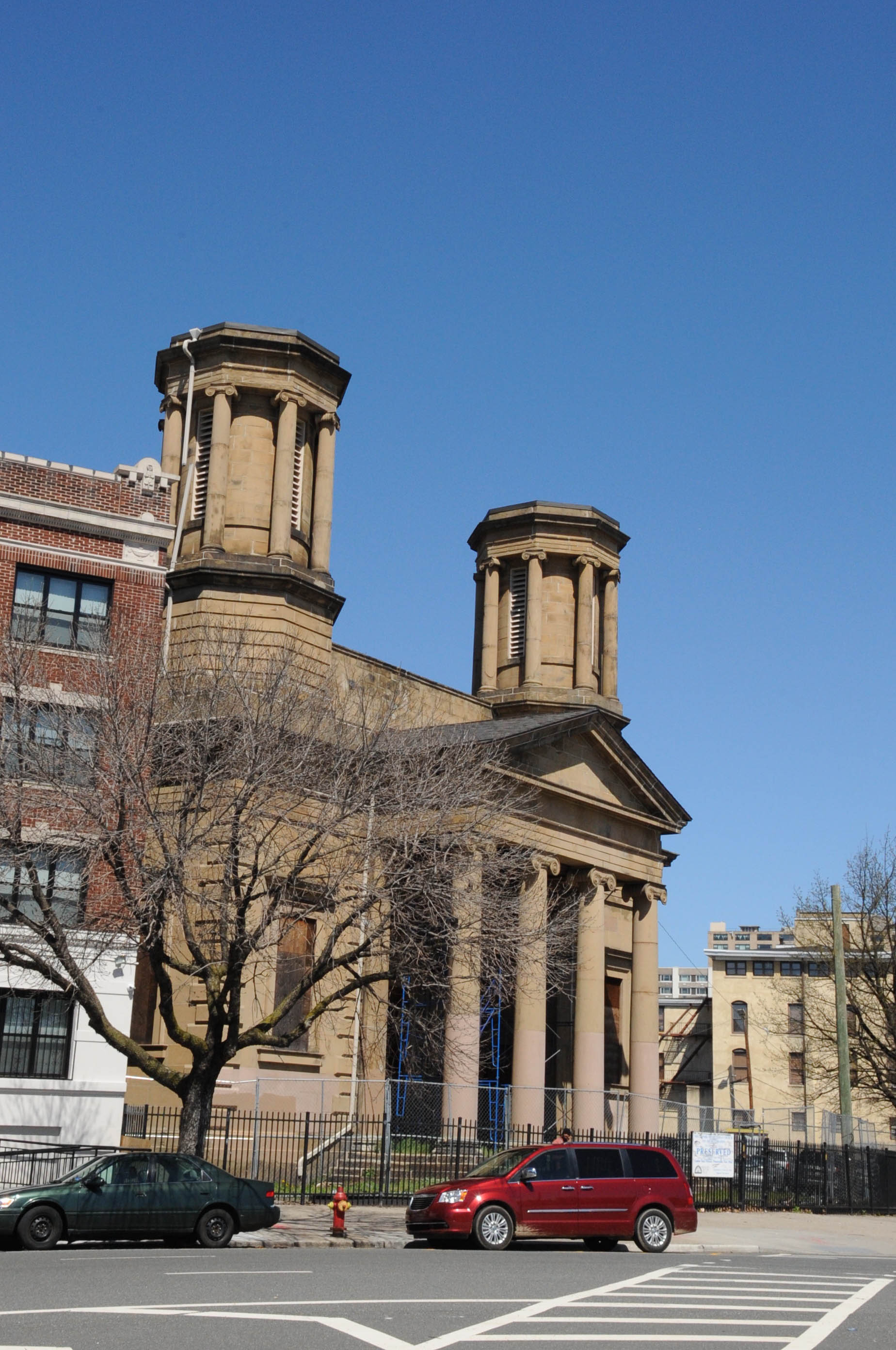
South Park Calvary United Presbyterian Church, Newark, New Jersey, 1853.

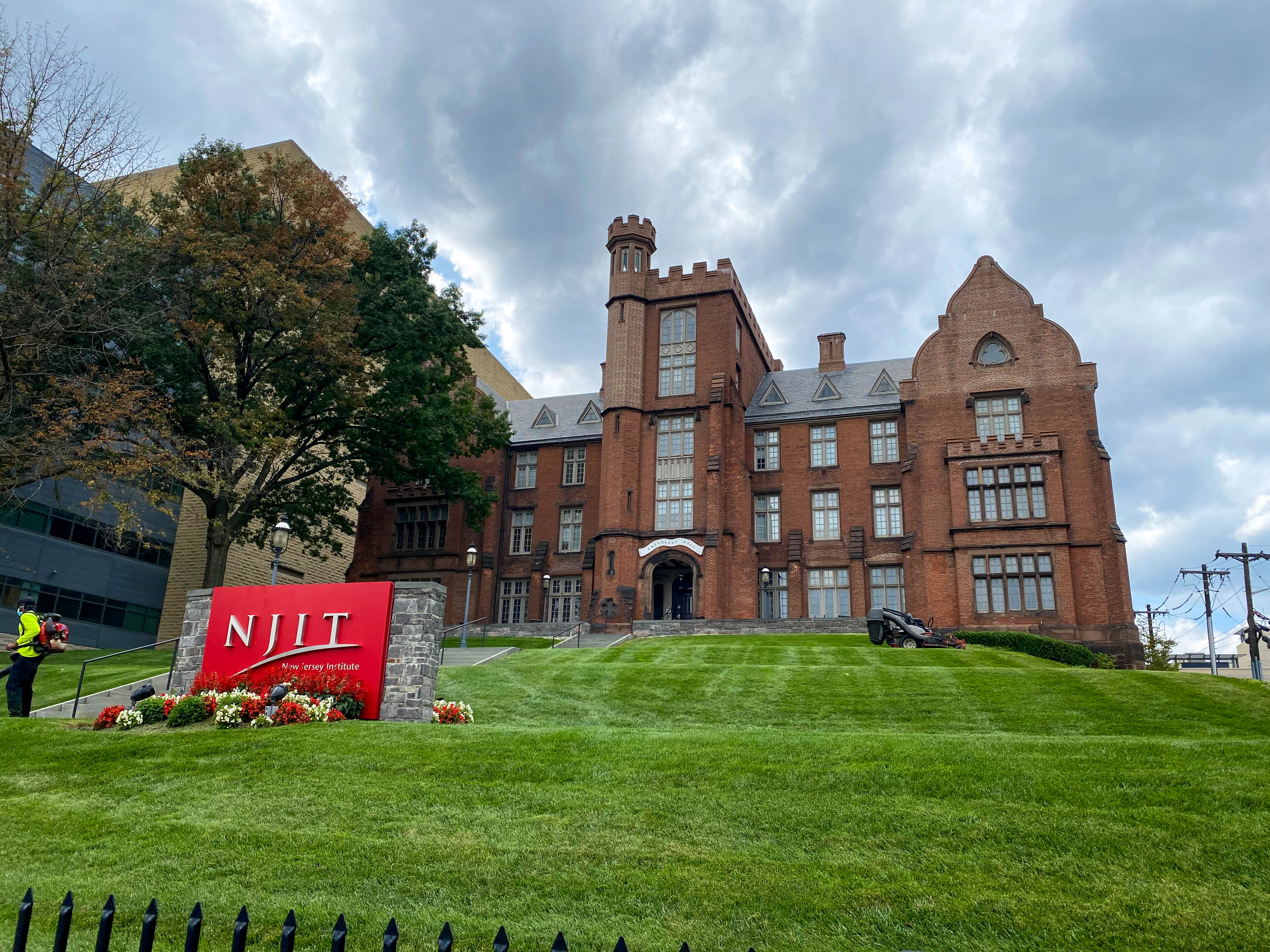
Newark Orphan Asylum, Newark, New Jersey, 1856-57.

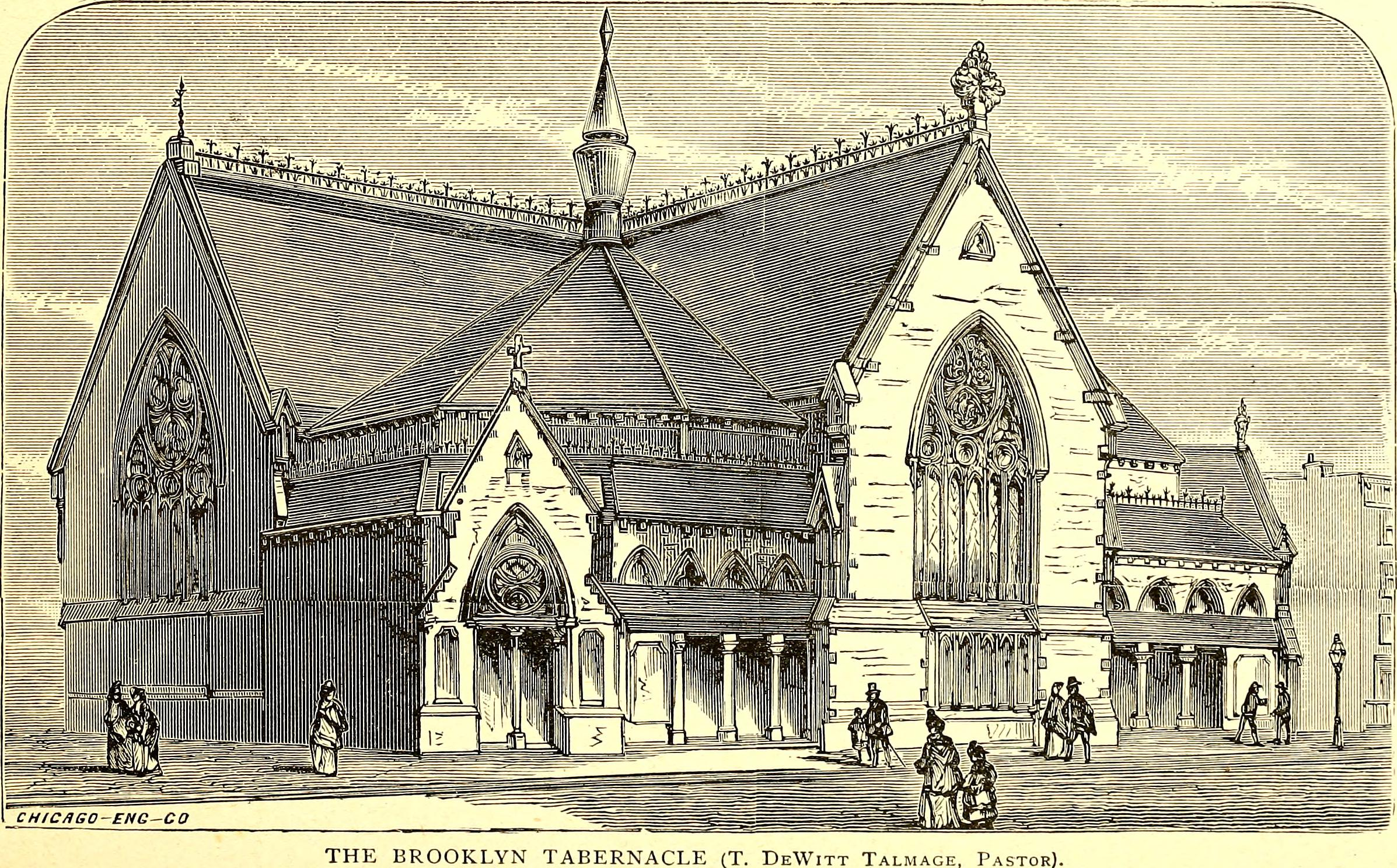
Brooklyn Tabernacle, Brooklyn, New York, 1873-74.

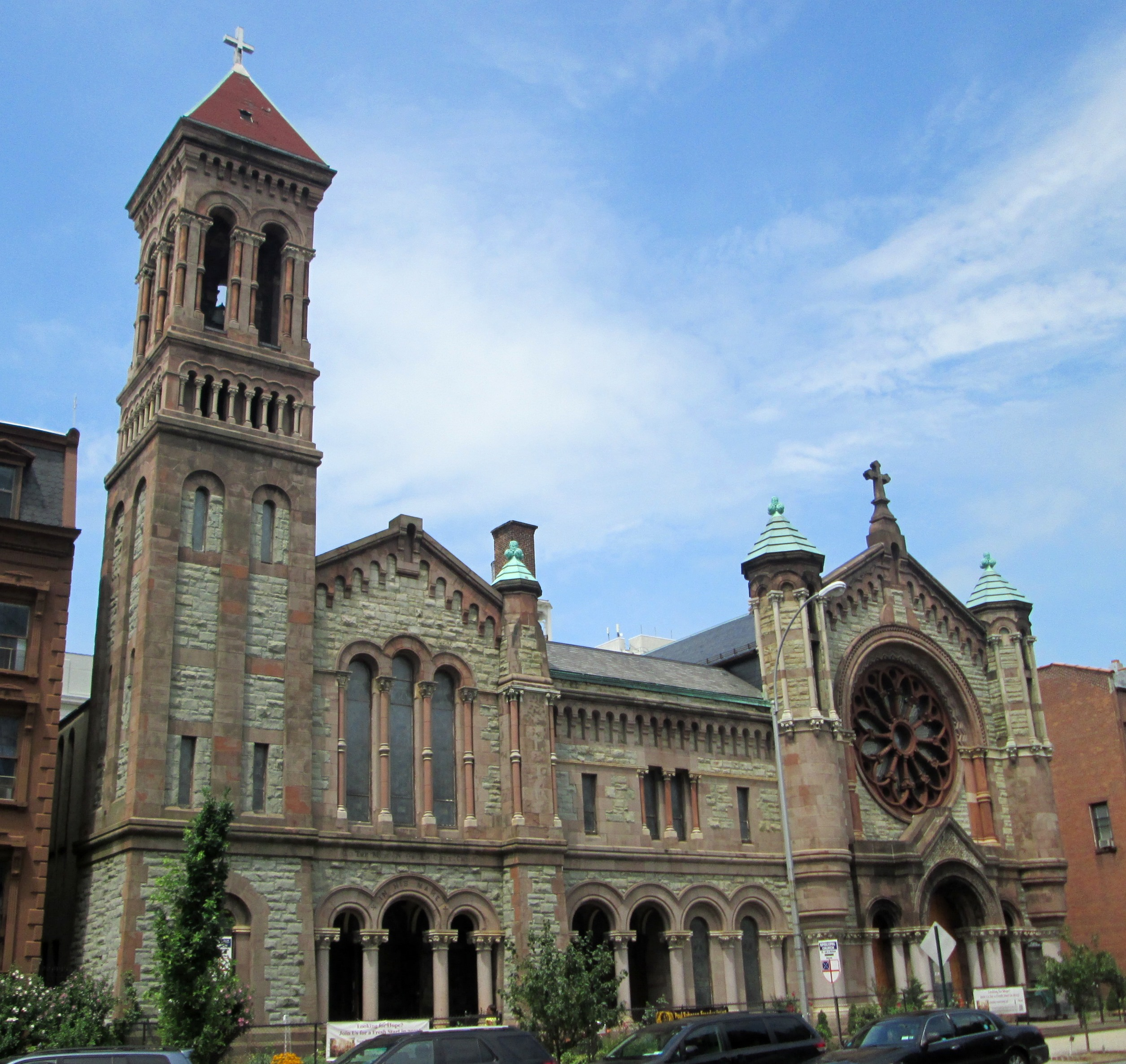
Episcopal Church of St. Luke and St. Matthew, Brooklyn, New York, 1889-91.

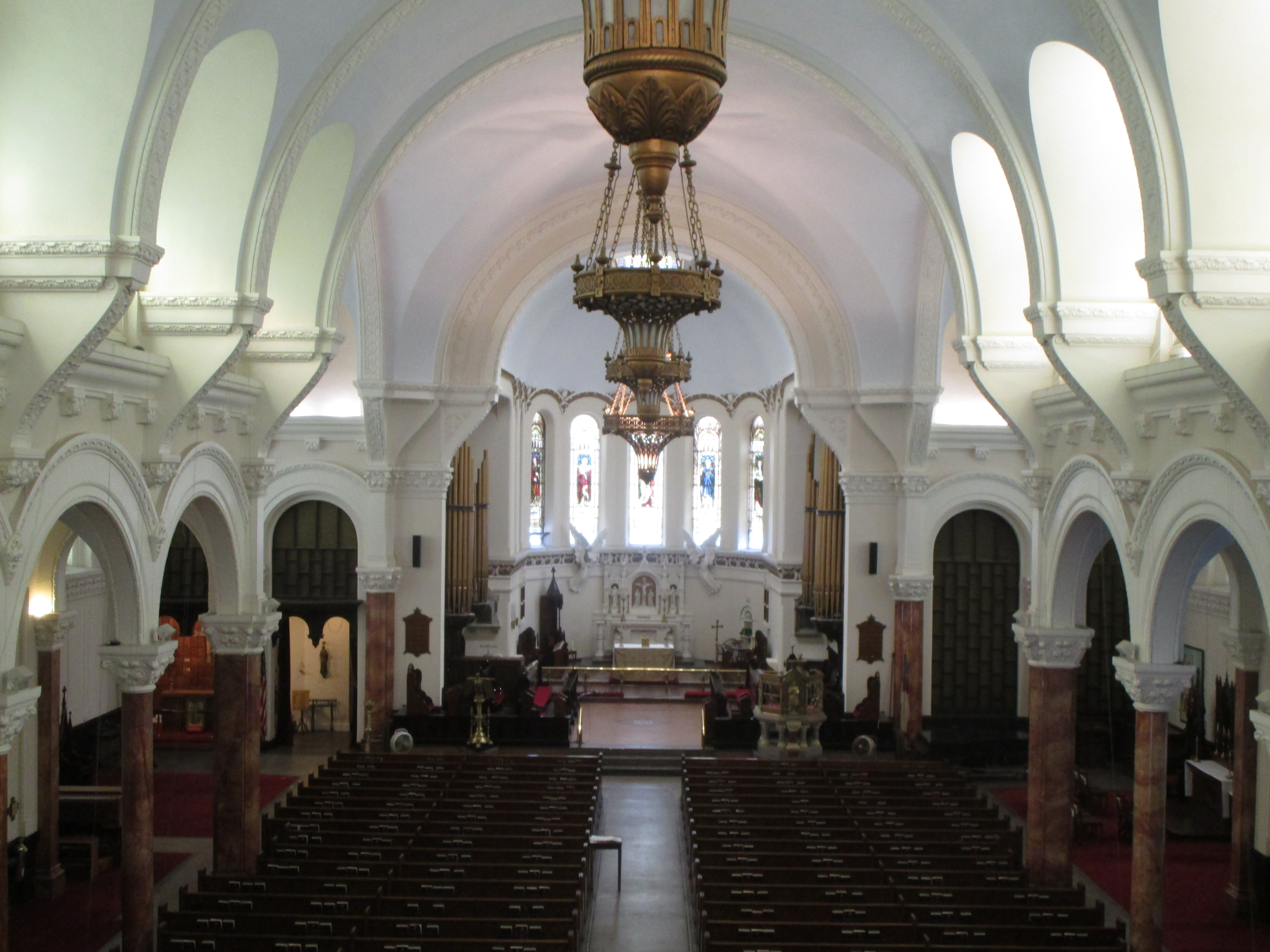
Interior view of the Episcopal Church of St. Luke and St. Matthew, Brooklyn, New York, 1889-91.

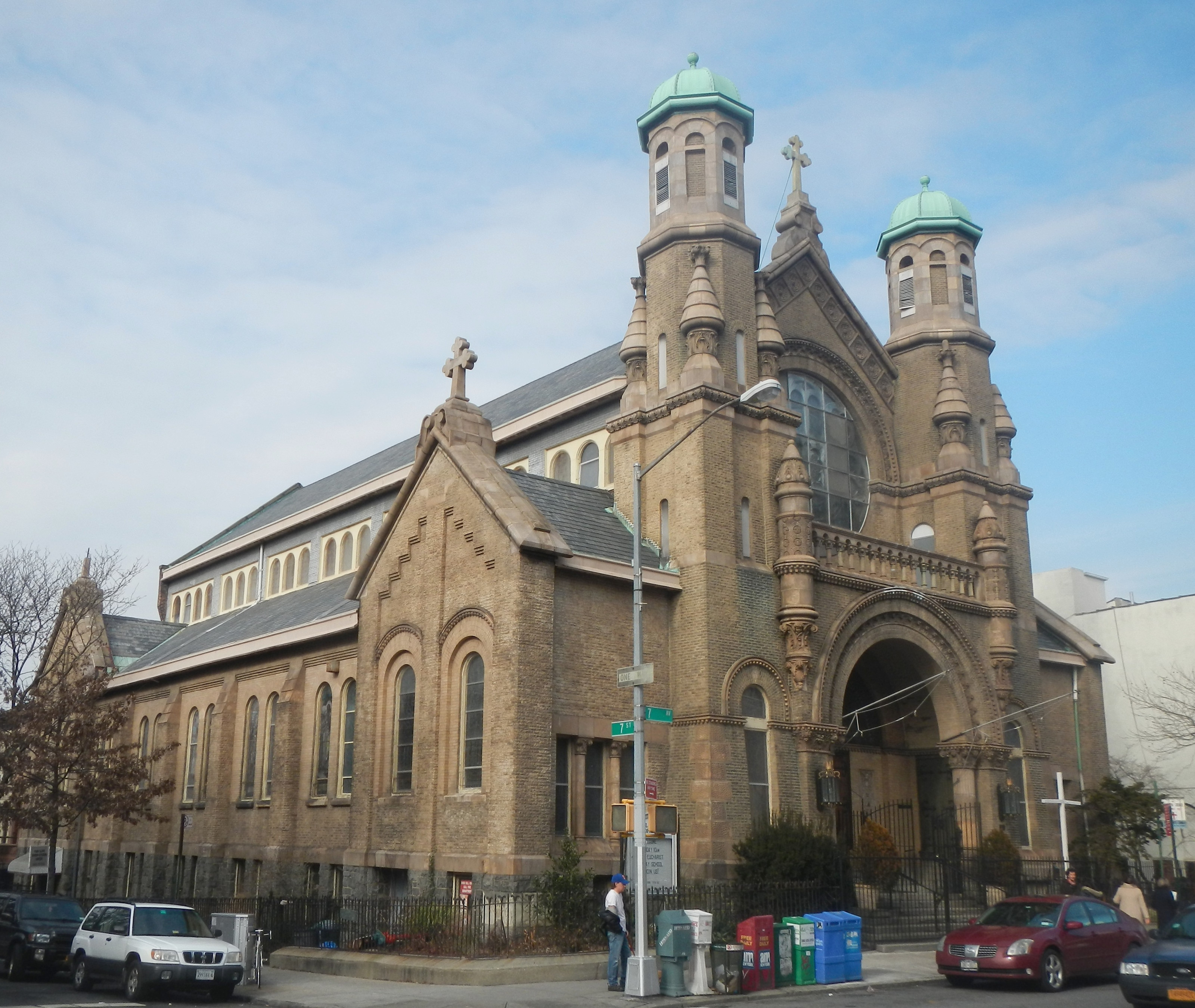
All Saints Episcopal Church, Brooklyn, New York, 1892-93.
