= Saul Fenster =

American academic administrator (1933–2025)

Saul K. Fenster (March 22, 1933 – March 15, 2025) was an American academic administrator who was the sixth president of New Jersey Institute of Technology (NJIT) from 1978 until 2002.

== Background ==
Fenster got his BS from City College of New York, MS from Columbia University, and PhD in Mechanical Engineering from the University of Michigan.

Fenster died on March 15, 2025, at the age of 91.

== Career ==
Before joining NJIT, Fenster served Fairleigh Dickinson University in faculty and administrative capacities, including six years as provost of the Rutherford campus. He taught a number of mechanical engineering courses at the Teaneck campus and was Head of the M.E. department in the late 1960s.

== Honors ==
Fenster was a Fellow of the American Society of Mechanical Engineers and the American Society for Engineering Education. He was also a member of Tau Beta Pi, the engineering honors society.

Academic offices
Preceded by William Hazell, Jr.	President of New Jersey Institute of Technology; 1978–2002	Succeeded by Robert A. Altenkirch
