= Frederick Eberhardt (philanthropist) =

American philanthropist (1868-1946)

- Born: Frederick L. Eberhardt; February 27, 1868; Newark, New Jersey, US
- Died: July 18, 1946 (aged 78); Maplewood, New Jersey, US
- Education: Newark Technical School
- Occupations: Engineer, philanthropist, university administrator
- Known for: President of Gould & Eberhardt, Eberhardt Hall, New Jersey Institute of Technology

Frederick L. Eberhardt (February 27, 1868 – July 18, 1946) was an American engineer, philanthropist, university administrator, and president of Gould & Eberhardt, a major Newark-based manufacturer of gear cutters and shapers, and other machine tools. Under his leadership the firm became a major supplier to the US auto industry, as well as to the military during World War II.

Eberhardt was born in Newark, New Jersey, the eldest son of Swiss-born Ulrich Eberhardt and his American wife, Emeline T Eberhardt. Eberhardt graduated from the inaugural class of 1885 at Newark Technical School, which eventually became New Jersey Institute of Technology (NJIT).

Eberhardt married Martha Lou Boals, and they had three children: Ruth Boals Eberhardt, Frederick Gordon Eberhardt and Eleanor H Eberhardt. They lived in Newark, but by 1930 had moved to Maplewood, New Jersey.

Eberhardt Hall, New Jersey Institute of Technology is named in his honor.

Gould and Eberhardt Gear Machinery are still in the machine tool business, and are today based in Webster, Massachusetts.
