= New Jersey Institute of Technology =

Public university in Newark, New Jersey, US

- Former names: Newark College of Engineering (NCE) (1930–1975); Newark Technical School (NTS) (1881–1930)
- Type: Public research university
- Established: February 9, 1881; 145 years ago (Note: A precursor institution, the Newark Industrial Institute, opened in 1850 but closed during the Civil War (1861 – 1865) as most of its students were called to arms.)
- Accreditation: MSCHE
- Academic affiliations: Sea-grant; Space-grant; AAC&U; CHEN
- Endowment: $203.4 million (2025)
- Budget: $785.5 million (FY2025)
- President: John Pelesko
- Provost: Moshe Kam
- Faculty: 945 in Total, 748 FTE, (fall 2024)
- Students: 12,309 (fall 2025)
- Undergraduates: 9,827 (fall 2025)
- Postgraduates: 2,482 (fall 2025)
- Location: Newark, New Jersey, United States; 40°44′31″N 74°10′44″W
- Campus: 48 acres (19.4 ha) in a Large City
- Newspaper: The Vector
- Colors: NJIT red and white with blue accent
- Nickname: Highlanders
- Sporting affiliations: NCAA Division I : America East, MACFA (fencing, M, W), BSC (tennis, M, W), EIVA (volleyball, M), ECAC (swimming and diving, M). ACHA Division 2 : CSCHC (ice hockey, M).
- Mascot: The Highlander
- Website: njit.edu

The New Jersey Institute of Technology (NJIT) is a public research university in Newark, New Jersey, United States, with a graduate-degree-granting satellite campus in Jersey City. Founded in 1881 with the support of local industrialists and inventors, especially Edward Weston, NJIT opened as Newark Technical School in 1885 with 88 students. (Note: Frederick Eberhardt was a member of the first class.) As of fall 2025, the university enrolled 12,309 students, about 2,500 of whom live on its main campus in Newark's University Heights district. The university, which began and continues with an applied “hands on” orientation, has also become increasingly research oriented with an effort that began in the 60’s and is reflected today (2024) in a 171+ million-dollar budget.

NJIT offers 51 undergraduate (Bachelor of Science/Arts) majors and 71 graduate (Masters and PhD) programs. Via its Honors College, it also offers professional programs in Healthcare and Law in collaboration with nearby institutions including Rutgers Medical School and Seton Hall Law School. Cross-registration with Rutgers University-Newark which borders its campus is also available. NJIT is classified among the "R1: Doctoral Universities – Very high research activity". It operates several off-campus facilities including the Big Bear Solar Observatory, home of the Goode Telescope; the Owens Valley Radio Observatory (both in California); and a suite of automated observatories across Antarctica, South America and the U.S.

NJIT is a member of the Sea grant and Space grant research consortia. It has participated in the McNair Scholars Program since 1999. NJIT is a designated Asian American Native American Pacific Islander serving institution and a designated Hispanic-serving institution.

== History ==
=== Founding ===
The New Jersey Institute of Technology has a history dating back to the 19th century. Originally introduced from Essex County, New Jersey, on March 24, 1880, and revised with input from the Newark Board of Trade in 1881, an act of the New Jersey State Legislature drew up a contest to determine which municipality would become home to the state's urgently needed technical school. The challenge was straightforward: the state would stake "at least $3,000 and not more than $5,000" and the municipality that matched the state's investment would earn the right to establish the new school.

=== 19th century ===
The Newark Board of Trade, working jointly with the Newark City Council, launched a campaign to win the new school. Many of the city's industrialists, along with other private citizens, supported the fund-raiser. By 1884 the necessary funds were raised. Newark Technical School opened its doors in February 1885.

The first 88 students, mostly evening students, attended classes in a rented building at 21 West Park Street. That facility soon became inadequate for the growing number of students. A second fundraiser, the institution's first capital campaign, was launched to support the construction of a home for Newark Technical School. In 1886, under the leadership of the school's first director, Charles A. Colton, the cornerstone was laid at the intersection of High Street and Summit Place for a three-story building later to be named Weston Hall in honor of the institution's early benefactor.

=== 20th century ===
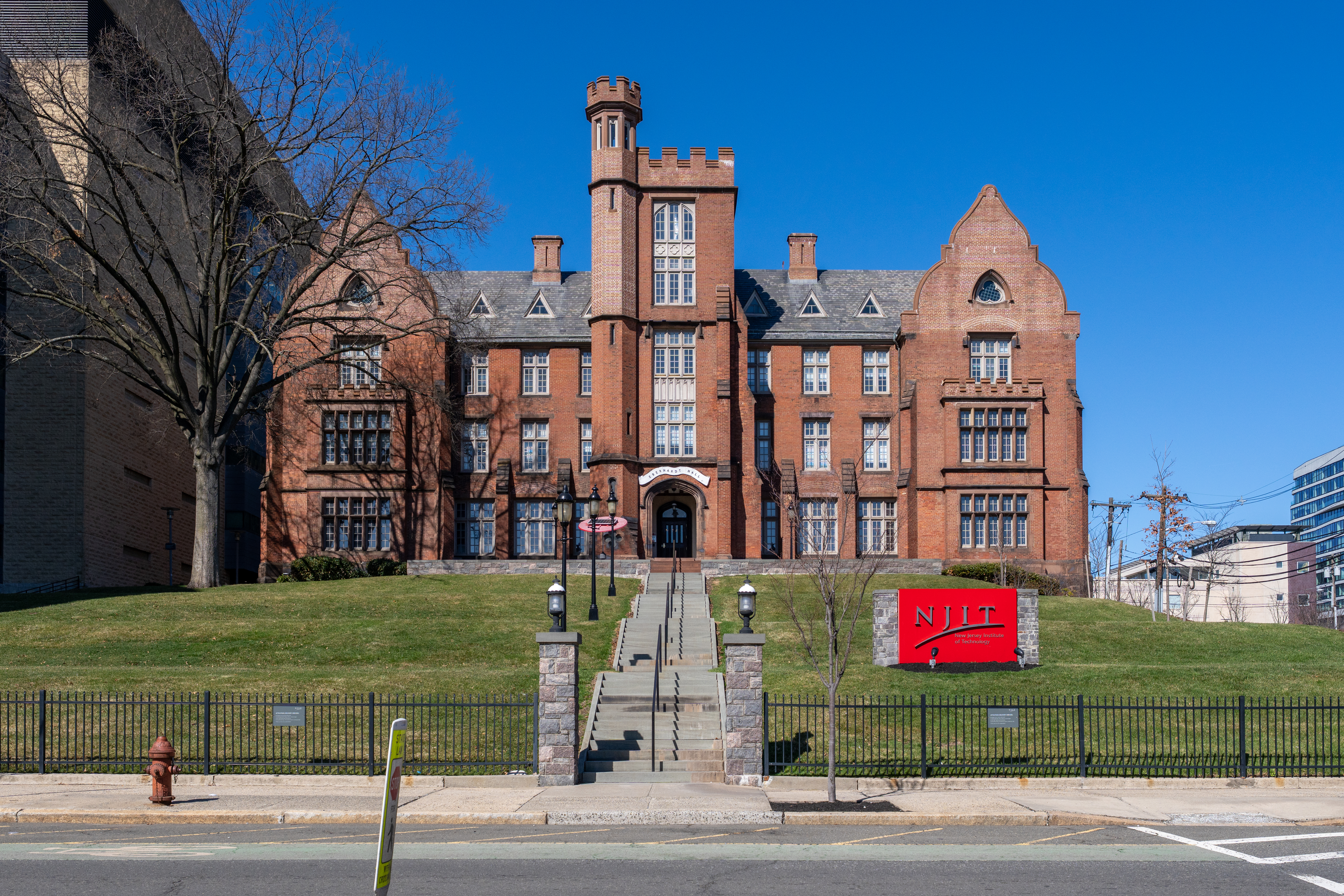
Eberhardt Hall

A laboratory building called Colton Hall was added to the campus in 1911.

Allan Cullimore led the institution from 1920 to 1949 transforming Newark Technical School into Newark College of Engineering, a name change that was adopted in 1930. Campbell Hall was erected in 1925. Due to the Depression and World War II, only the former Newark Orphan Asylum, now Eberhardt Hall, was purchased and modestly renovated in the succeeding decades. Cullimore left an unpublished history of the institution dated 1955.

In 1946, about 75% of the freshman class had served in the U.S. Armed Forces. Cullimore Hall was built in 1958 and two years later the old Weston Hall was razed and replaced with the current seven-story structure. Doctoral level programs were introduced in 1960. Six years later, in 1966, an 18-acre (7.3 ha), four-building expansion was completed.

With the addition of the New Jersey School of Architecture in 1973, the institution had evolved into a technological university, offering a widening range of graduate and undergraduate degrees and an increasing focus on research and public service. William Hazell, president at the time, decided the school's name should be changed to more clearly reflect its ongoing evolution. Alumni were solicited for suggestions. The winning suggestion was submitted by Joseph M. Anderson (1925). Anderson's suggestion, New Jersey Institute of Technology, emphasized the increasing scope of educational and research initiatives at the institution. The Board of Trustees approved the name change in September 1974. Newark College of Engineering officially became New Jersey Institute of Technology on January 1, 1975. The Newark College of Engineering name was retained for NJIT's engineering school.

The establishment of a residential campus and the opening of NJIT's first dormitory (Redwood Hall) in 1979 began a period of steady growth that continues today under an evolving Master Plan. Two new schools were established at the university during the 1980s, the College of Science and Liberal Arts in 1982 and the School of Industrial Management in 1988. The Albert Dorman Honors College was established in 1994, and the newest school, the College of Computing Sciences, was created in 2001. Also, three residential halls, Cypress, Oak, and Laurel which house about 1500 students in total, were placed in service in the 1990s.

=== 21st century ===
On May 2, 2003, Robert Altenkirch was inaugurated as president. He succeeded Saul Fenster who was named the university's sixth president in 1978. In September 2011 Altenkirch elected to return to the South having been offered the presidency of the University of Alabama in Huntsville. On January 9, 2012, NJIT Trustees named Joel Bloom president.

In 2003, the opening of the new Campus Center on the site of the former Hazell Hall centralized campus social events. Construction of a new Atrium, Bookstore, Dining Hall, computer lab, Information Desk facility, and new student organization offices continued into 2004. In 2005 a row of automobile chop shops adjacent to campus were demolished. In 2006 construction of a near-campus residence hall by American Campus Communities began in the chop shops' location. The new hall, which opened in 2007, is dubbed the University Centre. In addition to NJIT students, it houses students from Rutgers-Newark, Seton Hall University and Rutgers Law School.

Also in 2005, Eberhardt Hall was fully renovated and re-inaugurated as the Alumni Center and the symbolic front door to the university. Its restored tower was the logo of the former Newark College of Engineering. A rebranding campaign with the current slogan, "NJIT – New Jersey's Science and Technology University – The Edge in Knowledge", was launched to emphasize NJIT's position as New Jersey's science-and-technology-focused public research university.

NJIT's business school, the Martin Tuchman School of Management, focuses on utilizing technology to serve business needs. The school, which is an AACSB-accredited business school, benefits from its proximity to New York City and lower Jersey City aka, "Wall Street West". Wall Street itself (lower Manhattan) is twenty-five minutes away via Newark Light Rail and the PATH system's Newark-World Trade Center line. NJIT has a multi-faceted collaboration with its neighbor, Rutgers-Newark. The collaboration involves the Rutgers and NJIT business schools; their federated departments of Biology and History; and the joint Theater Arts Program. In 2008 NJIT began a program with the Heritage Institute of Technology in West Bengal, India under which 20 students come to NJIT for summer internships.

In 2009, the New Jersey School of Architecture was enlarged and reorganized as the College of Architecture and Design (COAD). Within the college, the New Jersey School of Architecture continues, along with the newly established School of Art + Design.

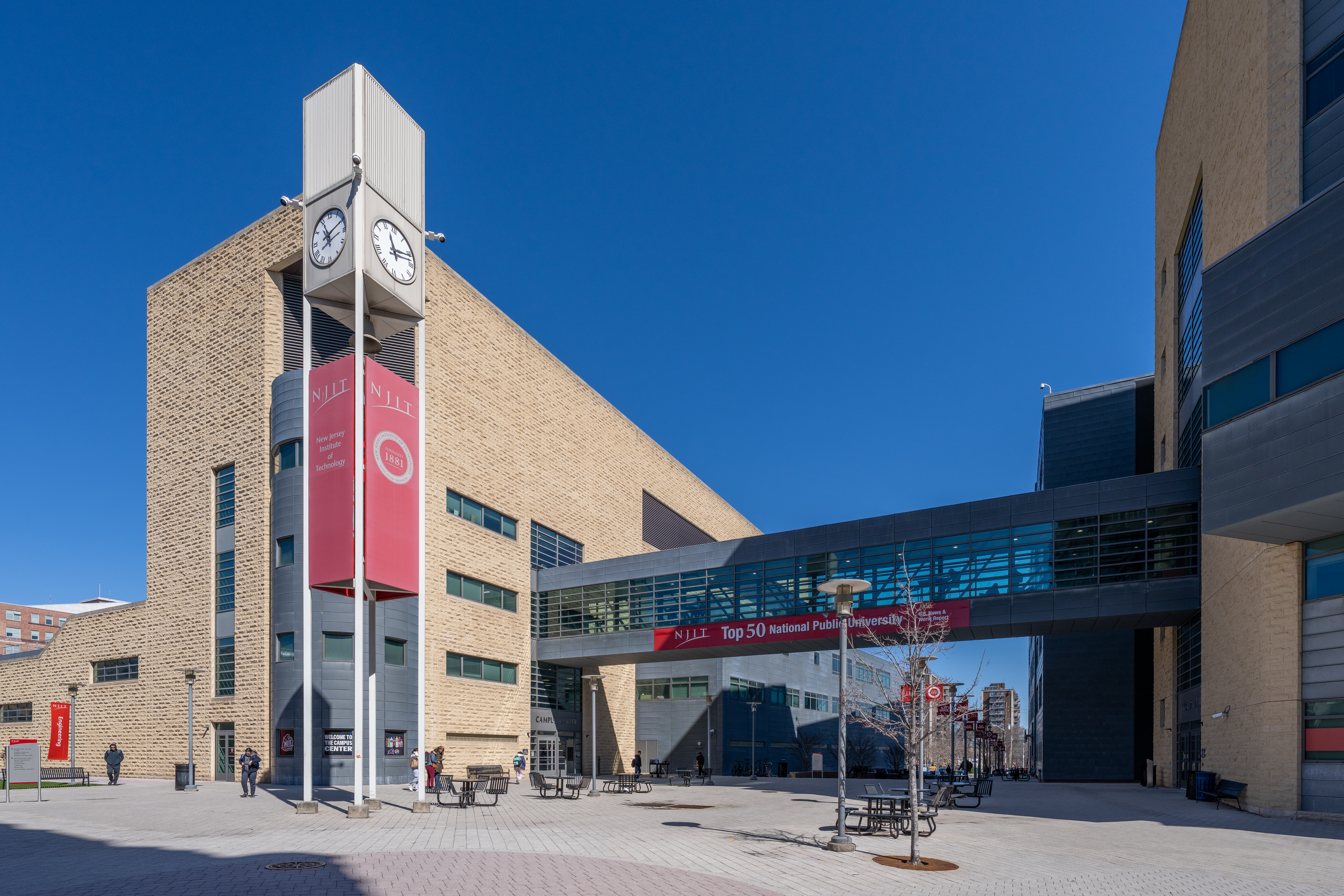
Walkway over Summit Street

In June 2010, NJIT purchased the old Central High School building which is located between the NJIT and Rutgers–Newark campuses. With the completion of the purchase, Summit Street, from Warren Street to New Street, was converted into a pedestrian walkway. Since then the high school building was extensively renovated, preserved, and updated per the Campus Master Plan.

Between 2016 and 2018, several facilities opened, including a 209,000-square-foot (19,400 m^{2}) multi-purpose Wellness and Events Center, "The WEC", which features a retractable-seating arena that can accommodate 3,500 spectators or 4,000 event participants; a 24,000-square-foot (2,200 m^{2}) Life Sciences and Engineering Center; a 10,000-square-foot (930 m^{2}) Makerspace, and a parking garage with spaces for 933 cars.

=== University presidents ===
The following persons have served as the president of the New Jersey Institute of Technology:

| No. | President | Term start | Term end | Ref. |
|---|---|---|---|---|
Directors of Newark Technical School (NTS) (1881–1930)
| 1 | Charles A. Colton | 1884 | 1918 |
| 2 | Daniel Hodgdon | 1918 | 1920 |
| 3 | Allan Cullimore | 1920 | 1947 |
Presidents of Newark College of Engineering (NCE) (1930–1975)
| acting | Robert Van Houten | 1947 | September 23, 1949 |
| 4 | Robert Van Houten | September 23, 1949 | June 30, 1970 |
| 5 | William Hazell | July 1, 1970 | June 30, 1975 |
Presidents of New Jersey Institute of Technology (NJIT) (1975–present)
| interim | Paul H. Newell Jr | July 1, 1975 | 1977 |
| interim | Charles R. Bergman | August 1977 | 1978 |
| 6 | Saul Fenster | 1978 | 2002 |
| 7 | Robert A. Altenkirch | 2002 | October 30, 2011 (Note: Resigned to lead University of Alabama in Huntsville.) |
| interim | Joel Bloom | November 1, 2011 | January 9, 2012 |
| 8 | Joel Bloom | January 9, 2012 | June 30, 2022 |
| 9 | Teik C. Lim | July 1, 2022 | August 3, 2026 |
| interim | John Pelesko | August 4, 2026 |

== Academics ==
=== Rankings ===
Academic rankings

National
- Forbes: 101
- U.S. News & World Report: 80
- Washington Monthly: 91
- WSJ/College Pulse: 39

Global
- ARWU: 801-900
- QS: 741-750
- THE: 501-600
- U.S. News & World Report: 826

- In a TIME ranking published in August 2026, NJIT was ranked 38th among public colleges in the US and 95th among all US colleges.
- In U.S. News 2025 edition of its college rankings, NJIT was ranked tied for 80th among "national universities".
- In the 2024 edition of the Princeton Review, NJIT was ranked twenty-third in the list of the fifty best value public colleges in the US.
- In 2024, Washington Monthly ranked NJIT 101st among 438 national universities in the U.S. based on NJIT's contribution to the public good, as measured by social mobility, research, and promoting public service.
- In November 2023 Stacker ranked NJIT 10th among public universities for return on investment.
- In the 2021 edition of the QS World University Ranking USA, NJIT was ranked 90th (2-way tie) out of the 352 US Institutions listed (more than 750 considered).
- In April 2018, Forbes ranked NJIT #1 in the country in upward mobility defined in terms of moving students from the bottom fifth of the income distribution to the top fifth. In the 2024-25 Forbes list of America's top colleges, NJIT was ranked 193rd out of the top 500 rated private and public colleges and universities in America for the 2024-25 report. NJIT was also ranked 88th among public colleges and 77th in the northeast. Its career development services are ranked among the best in the country

== Colleges and schools ==
Comprising five colleges and one school, the university is organized into 21 departments, three of which, Biological Sciences, History, and Theater Arts are federated with Rutgers-Newark whose campus abuts NJIT's. With a student population that is 20.6% international, 20.2% Hispanic, 8.8% Black and 19.1% Asian (2022), the school is ranked among the most ethnically diverse national universities in the country. NJIT has multiple study abroad options along with extensive co-op, internship, and service opportunities. Its career development services are ranked among the best in the country.

=== Newark College of Engineering (NCE) ===
Newark College of Engineering, which was established in 1919, is among the oldest and largest professional engineering schools in the United States. It offers 13 undergraduate degree programs, 16 master's and 10 doctoral degree programs. Undergraduate enrollment is more than 2,500, and more than 1,100 are enrolled in graduate study. The faculty includes engineers and scholars who are widely recognized in their fields. An estimated one in four professional engineers in the State of New Jersey are NCE/NJIT alumni.

=== Jordan Hu College of Science and Liberal Arts (JHCSLA) ===
The College of Science and Liberal Arts was formed in 1982. It was originally known as the Third College having been preceded by Newark College of Engineering and the New Jersey School of Architecture. In 1986 its name was changed to the College of Science and Liberal Arts as a result of a more sharply defined mission and direction. The College of Science and Liberal Arts is located inside a building sharing the same name. The building was originally named Cullimore Hall and is still referred to as that by students. Growing steadily ever since, JHCSLA has spawned two of NJIT's colleges: the Albert Dorman Honors College, which evolved out of the Honors Program that was founded in JHCSLA in 1985, and the College of Computing Sciences, which developed out of JHCSLA's Computer and Information Science Department.

=== J. Robert and Barbara A. Hillier College of Architecture and Design (HCAD) ===
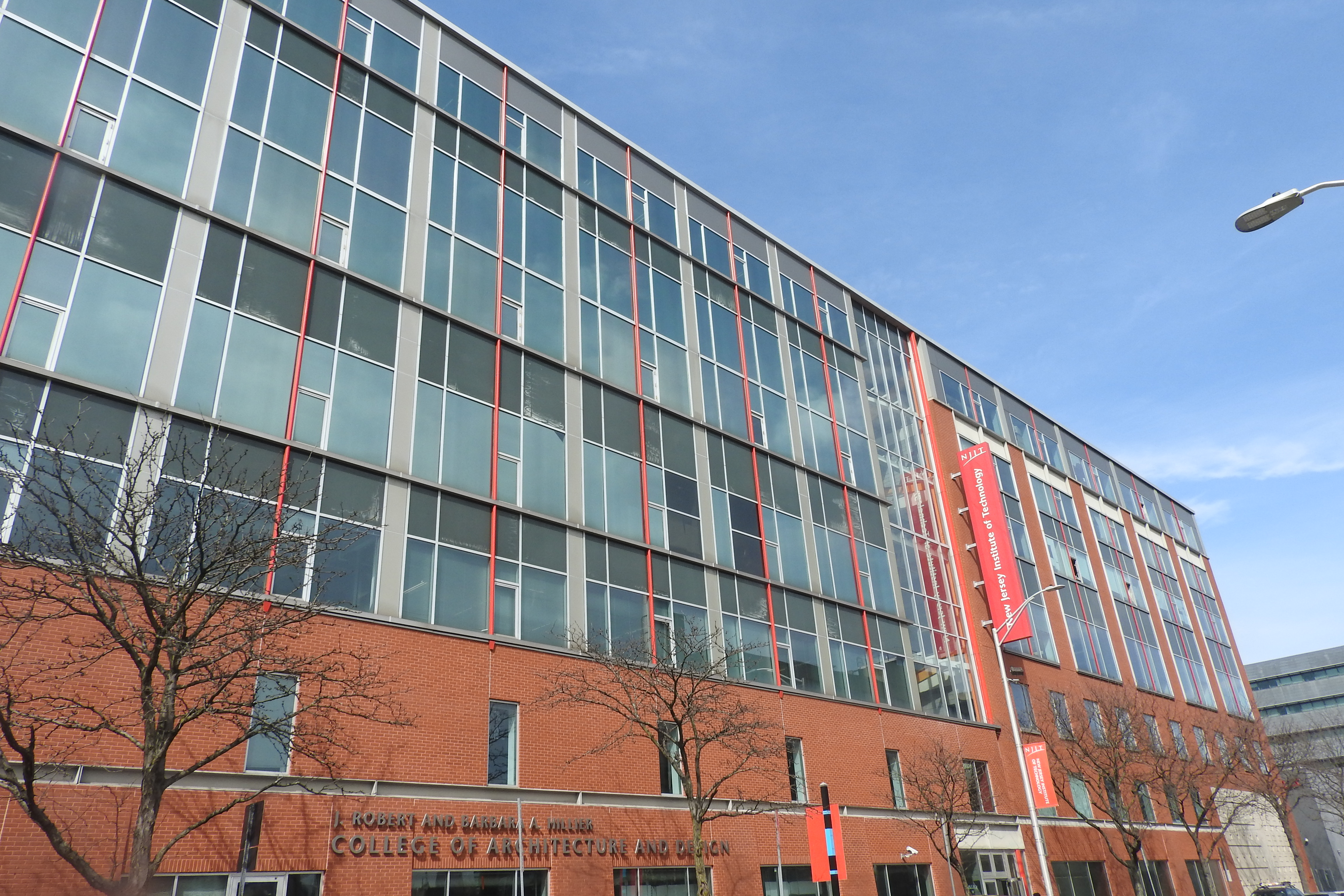
College of Architecture and Design

The College of Architecture and Design houses the School of Architecture (SOA) and the School of Art and Design. HCAD is the only college at NJIT to have its own designated library. The library contains materials related to the majors offered in HCAD in the form of periodicals, reference materials, rare books, visual materials, including architectural drawings, prints, postcards, and maps, digital databases, and a materials library.

=== Ying Wu College of Computing Sciences (YWCC) ===
The Computer Science department, part of the Ying Wu College of Computing Sciences, is the largest at NJIT, comprising more than one fifth of the student population. It is also the largest computer science department among all research universities in the New York metropolitan area. In December 2019, the college opened a satellite facility in Jersey City that focuses on financial technology aimed at the professionals working in the financial industry on Wall Street and in Jersey City, aka Wall St. West.

=== Martin Tuchman School of Management (MTSM) ===
The Martin Tuchman School of Management was established in 1988 and was accredited by the Association to Advance Collegiate Schools of Business in 1997. Degrees available include a Bachelor of Science, a Master of Science in management, a Master of Business Administration (MBA) program, and an Executive MBA program for managers and professionals. MTSM also offers a PhD degree in Business Data Science. MTSM hosts entrepreneurship programs for the regional community, including the NSF I-Corps, the New Venture Assistance Program, and the Greater Newark–Jersey City Regional Business Model Competition.

== Research ==
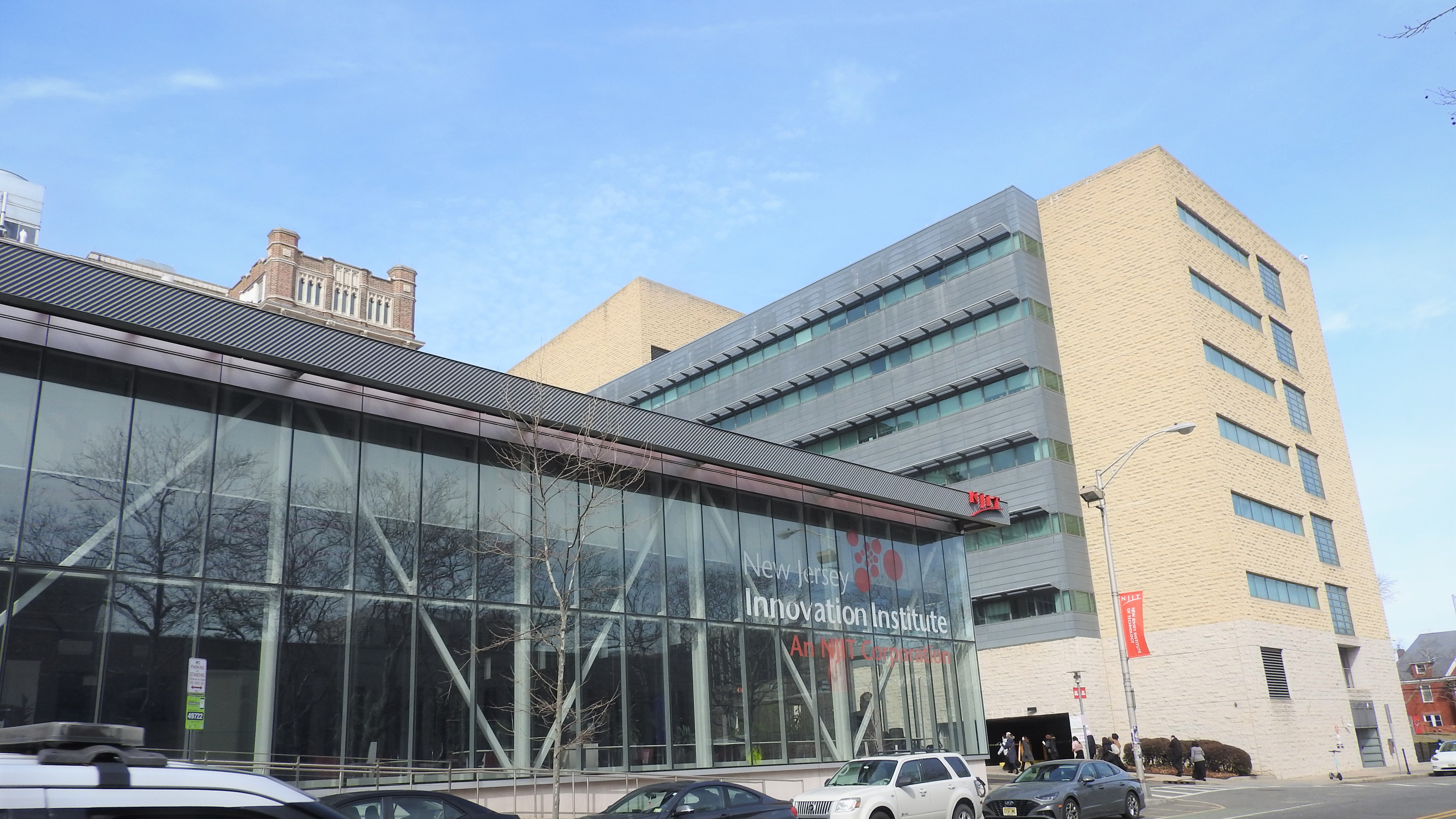
New Jersey Innovation Institute

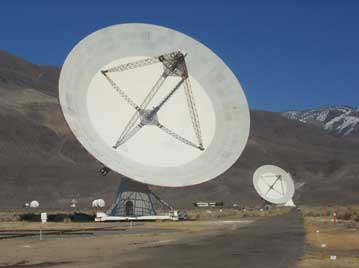
Owens Valley Solar Array

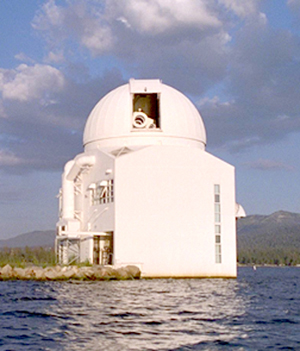
Big Bear Solar Observatory

NJIT's R&D expenditures were $142 million in 2017 and $162 million in 2018. Areas of focus include applied mathematics, materials science, biomedical engineering, cybersecurity, and solar-terrestrial physics – of which the Center for Solar-Terrestrial Research is a world leader. A key agent in regional economic development, NJIT hosts VentureLink, formally the Enterprise Development Center (EDC), an on-campus business incubator that houses over 90 start-ups, and the New Jersey Innovation Institute (NJII) which offers R&D services to business.

The university has engaged in research in nanotechnology, solar-terrestrial physics, polymer science, and the development of a smart gun technology. The university research centers include the National Center for Transportation and Industrial Productivity and SmartCampus. The university hosts the Metro New York FIRST Robotics office. NJIT also hosts the Center for Solar-Terrestrial Research which owns and operates the Big Bear Solar Observatory, one of the world's largest solar observatories which is in Big Bear Lake, California, and operates the Owens Valley Solar Array, near Bishop, California.

NJIT was home to the Computerized Conferencing and Communications Center (CCCC), a research center that specialized in computer-mediated communication. The systems which resulted from this research are the Electronic Information Exchange System, as well as the continuations: The Electronic Information Exchange System 2 (EIES2), and the Tailorable Electronic Information Exchange System (TEIES). One of the foremost developments of EIES was that of the "Virtual Classroom", a term coined by Dr. Starr Roxanne Hiltz in the context of Connected Education. This was the first e-learning platform in the world and was unique in that it evolved onto an existing communications system, rather than having a system created specifically for it. Their missions completed, the CCCC and EIES were terminated in the mid-90s.

The university currently operates a Class-10 cleanroom and a Class-1000 cleanroom on campus for academic and research purposes including counter-bioterrorism research.

The university maintains an advanced 67-node supercomputer cluster in the Mathematics Department for research purposes.

NJIT conducts cybersecurity research in a number of areas including cross-domain information sharing, data security and privacy, data mining for malware detection, geospatial information security, secure social networks, and secure cloud computing. The university is designated a National Center of Academic Excellence (CAE) in Cyber Defense Education through the 2020 academic year by the National Security Agency and Department of Homeland Security.

=== Libraries and archives supporting research ===
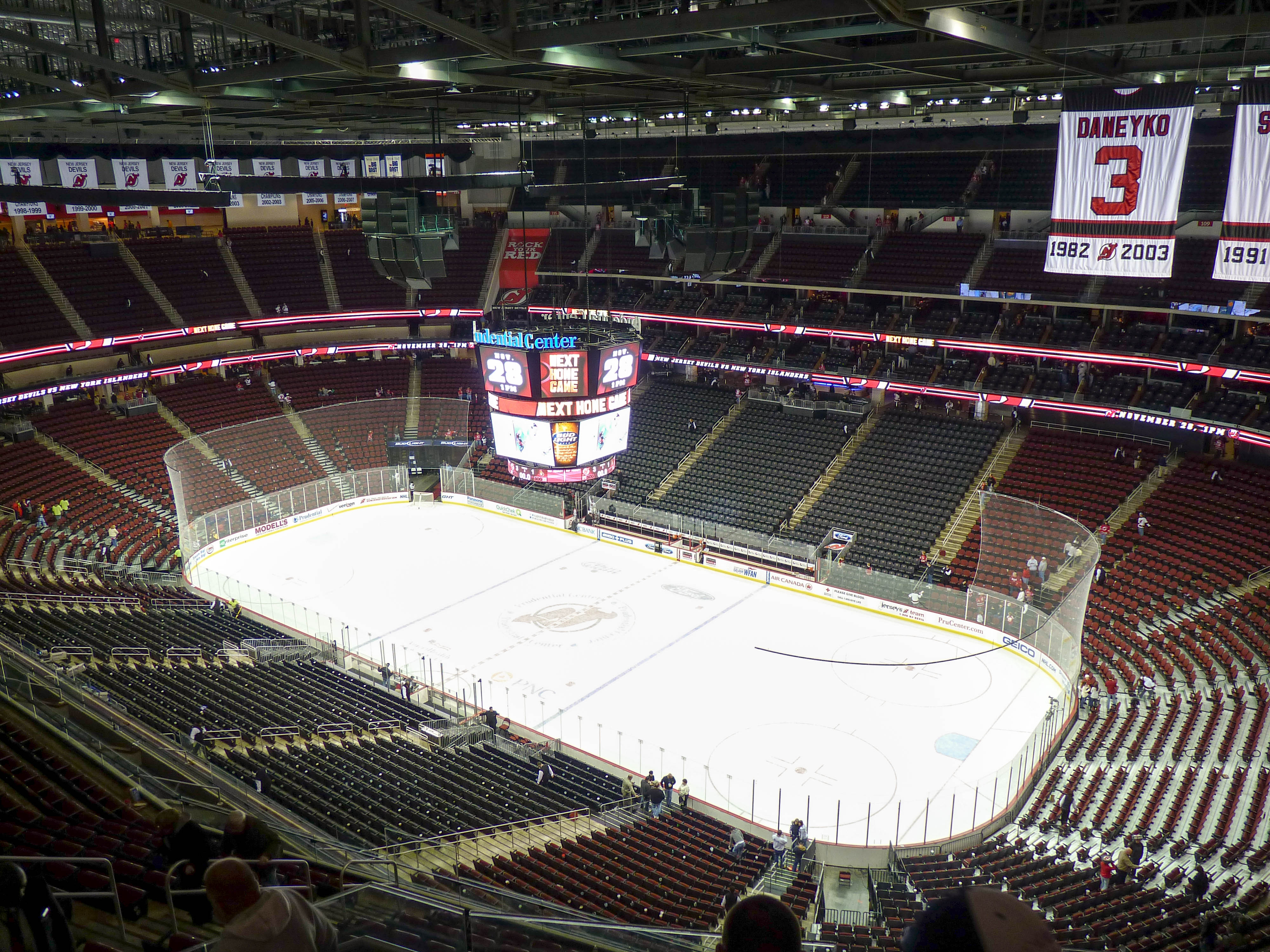
NJIT plays club-level ice hockey in the Colonial States College Hockey Conference, with their home games played at Prudential Center

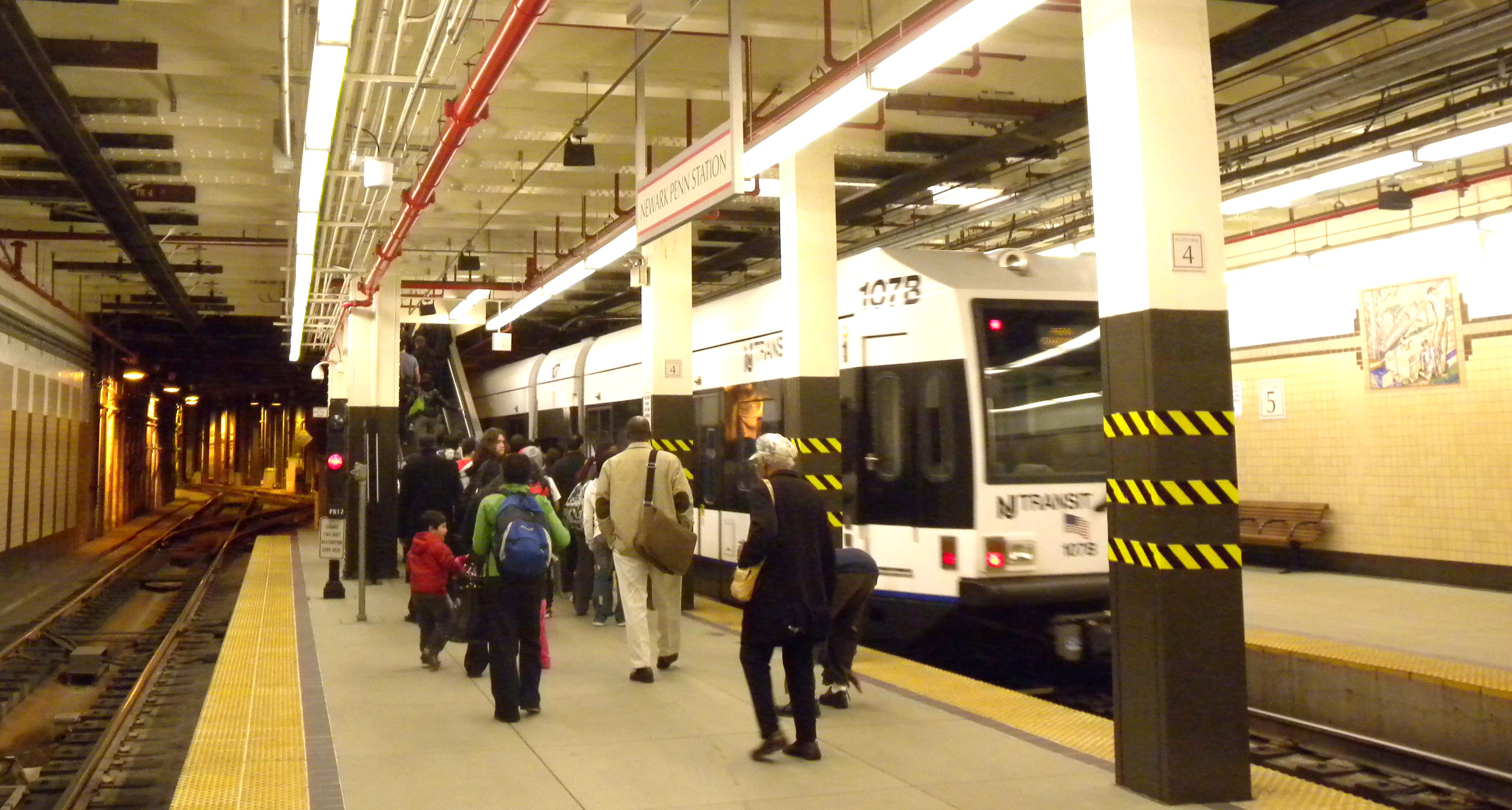
The Warren Street/NJIT station is an on-campus station of the Newark Light Rail system. The Light Rail line terminates at Newark's Penn Station, where PATH rail and NJ Transit rail and bus access to New York City is available.

NJIT's Main Library, the Robert W. Van Houten Library, is in the Central Avenue Building, a facility for quiet and group study, researching, and browsing print and online sources. Since 1997 the Van Houten Information Commons has housed 120 computer workstations.

The Barbara and Leonard Littman Library for Architecture and Design is located in Weston Hall. It houses a core collection that includes print and electronic books, journals, maps, drawings, models, e-images, materials samples, and over 70,000 slides.

Included among NJIT's information resources are the university's historical archive including items developed and manufactured by Edward Weston, a scientist, prolific inventor, and a founding member of the board of trustees of the university. Dr. Weston's collection of artifacts and rare books is housed in the Van Houten Library and is available to scholars interested in the history of science and technology.

== Residence life ==
Undergraduate demographics as of Fall 2025
| Race and ethnicity | Total |
|---|---|
| White | 29% |
| Hispanic | 29% |
| Asian | 20% |
| Black | 10% |
| International student | 6% |
| Two or more races | 3% |
| Unknown | 2% |
Economic diversity
| Low-income (Note: The percentage of students who received an income-based federal Pell grant intended for low-income students.) | 42% |
| Other (Note: The percent of students who do not receive for Pell Grants) | 58% |

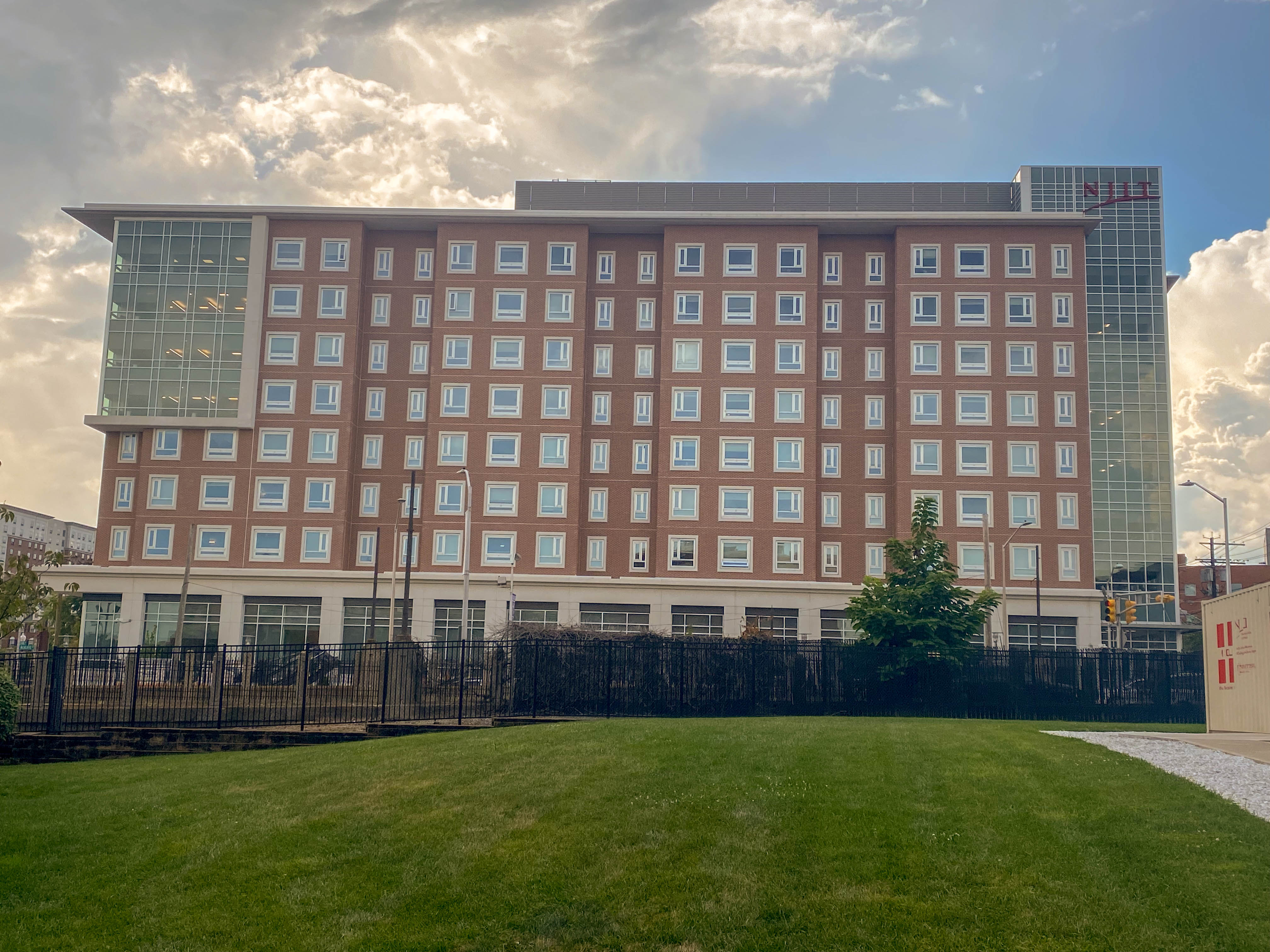
Maple Hall, opened in 2022, NJIT's newest residence hall

About 80% of NJIT students commute to campus. The Residence Life (on-campus) community currently includes a little over 2,500 students.

There are six residence halls on the NJIT campus. Redwood Hall, constructed in 1978, was the first, followed by Cypress, Oak, and Laurel (constructed in 1997 and extended in 1999). Cypress and Redwood are primarily used for freshman students, while Laurel and Oak house upperclassmen. The fifth, Warren Street Village (now called John Martinson Residence Hall), which opened in the fall of 2013, provides housing for Dorman Honors College students and several Greek houses (called Greek Way) which together provide space for about 600 students. The Warren Street Village also houses the Albert Dorman Honors College itself. A sixth dorm hall, Maple Hall, which accommodates 500 students opened in the fall of 2022.

A new almost-on-campus residence hall known as University Centre (run by American Campus Communities) was completed in 2007. Located near NJIT's Guttenberg Information Technologies Center (GITC) building, it houses students from NJIT, Rutgers–Newark, Rutgers Medical School and Seton Hall University. Many students from local institutions find housing in nearby neighborhoods and towns including Harrison, Kearny, Fairmount and East Orange.

== Student newspaper ==
The Vector is a weekly student newspaper published by the students of NJIT, originally established in 1924. It has both on-line and print versions. The tabloid print edition has an estimated circulation of 3,000 from on-campus distribution and a readership of approximately 9,000. The Vector won the Honor Rating of First Class from the Associated Collegiate Press in 1989–1990. The Vector is a current member of the Associated Collegiate Press. The Vector won two awards in the New Jersey Press Foundation's 2019-2020 awards, scoring a second place win for Arts & Entertainment writing and third place for General Excellence.

== Athletics ==
NJIT sponsors 19 NCAA- Division I varsity teams and 1 ACHA non-varsity Division 2 team. It also sponsors 2 club-level sports. Its teams are called the Highlanders. The school colors are red and white with blue accent. NJIT's teams compete at the NCAA Division I level primarily as members of the America East Conference (AEC). Several teams have affiliations outside of AEC as follows: Women's and men's tennis compete in the Big South Conference (BSC), men's fencing team is a member of the Mid-Atlantic Collegiate Fencing Association (MACFA). As of 2016, the women's fencing team is independent. Men's volleyball competes in the Eastern Intercollegiate Volleyball Association (EIVA). Woman's volleyball competes in the AEC.

On December 6, 2014, NJIT's basketball team, unranked and independent at the time, made headlines in national sports reports when they defeated the nationally ranked (#17) Michigan Wolverines.

NCAA Division I sports at NJIT are:

- (M) Baseball
- (M) (W) Basketball
- (M) (W) Cross country
- (M) (W) Fencing, men compete in MACFA, woman compete as an independent
- (M) Lacrosse
- (M) (W) Soccer
- (M) Swimming & diving, team competes in the ECAC
- (M) (W) Tennis, compete in BSC
- (M) (W) Track & field (indoor)
- (M) (W) Track & field (outdoor)
- (M) (W) Volleyball, men compete in EIVA, woman compete in the American East Conference

ACHA Division II sports:

- (M) Ice Hockey, compete in CSCHC

Club-level sports:

- (M) Ice Hockey
- (M) Bowling

=== Facilities ===
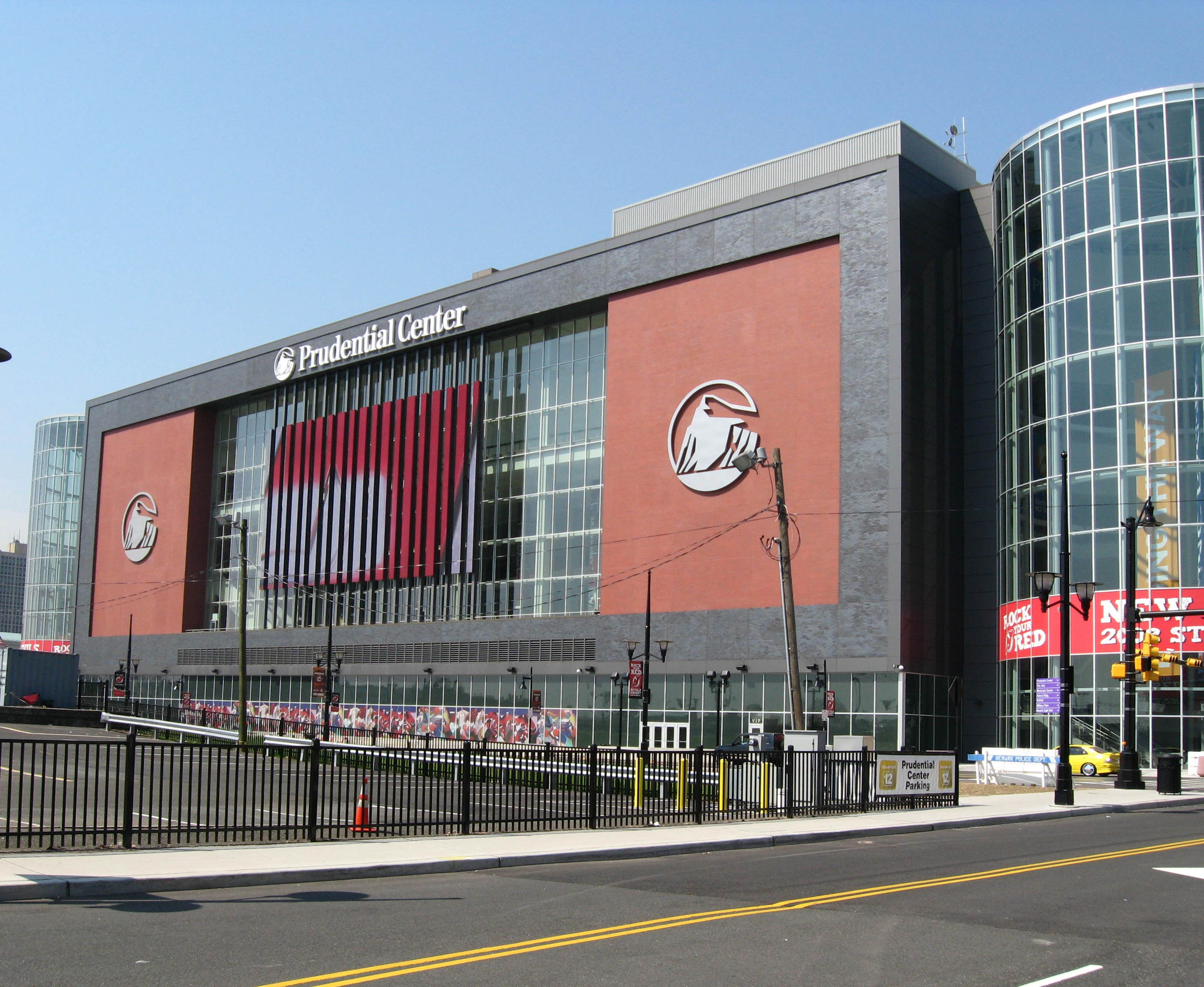
Prudential Center

In 2017, the institution opened the Wellness and Events Center, (the WEC), a major facility that includes a 3500-seat basketball and volleyball arena that can be converted into an event space capable of accommodating 4,000 attendees. In 2019, a new soccer and lacrosse field opened. The WEC replaced the Estelle & Zoom Fleisher Athletic Center.

== Notable faculty and alumni ==
Since its founding in 1881, NJIT has issued degrees to nearly 80,000 graduates. NJIT alumni have gone on to pursue distinguished careers in many sectors. As of May 2022, the school's founders, faculty and alumni include: Judea Pearl, a Turing Award winner (2011); Harry L. Ettlinger, a Congressional Gold Medal winner (2015); John J. Mooney, a National Medal of Technology and Innovation recipient (2002); Edward Weston (chemist), a Franklin Medal winner (1924); Wally Schirra, prominent astronaut (attended, transferred to USNA), Ellen M. Pawlikowski, retired 4-Star General and Professor, Albert Dorman, founding Chair and CEO of AECOM (Fortune 500 company) and T. J. O'Malley., prominent Aerospace Engineer.

Up to 2025, 27 members of NJIT's faculty have been elected to the National Academy of Inventors, including 17 Fellows, 3 of whom are lifetime fellows, and 10 Senior Members. Student awards as of 2025 include: 7 Fulbright scholars, 23 Goldwater Scholars, 29 National Science Foundation Graduate Research Fellowships, 27 Benjamin A. Gilman International Scholarships, 3 National Institute of Health Intermural Research Program awards, and 9 German Academic Exchange internships.

== See also ==
- The Vector – student newspaper
- NJIT Capstone Program
- 2007–08 NJIT Highlanders men's basketball team
- Arnold Air Society
