= Daniel Hodgdon =

9th President of Valparaiso University
- In office 1920–1921
- Preceded by: Henry Kinsey Brown
- Succeeded by: John E. Roessler

President of the New Jersey Institute of Technology
- In office 1918–1920

President of the Hahnemann Medical College and Hospital
- In office 1920–?

Personal details
- Born: 13 April 1885 Winthrop, Maine, United States
- Died: 7 March 1957 (aged 71) Santa Barbara, California, United States

Daniel Russell Hodgdon was an American college administrator, better known for his series of science books for young people. He was born on April 13, 1885, in Winthrop, Maine. He was a co-founder and later the President of New Jersey Institute of Technology (called at the time Newark College of Engineering) from 1918 until 1920. In 1920 he became the president of Hahnemann Medical College and Hospital and then Valparaiso University in Indiana. He resigned abruptly from Valparaiso on April 25, 1921, telling the trustees that "The university is a hotbed of Bolshevism, communism and other cults, and nothing we could do to thwart their propaganda has been of any avail because of inside influences."

Hodgdon was an author and co-author of the Creative Science Series of textbooks published by Hinds, Hayden & Eldredge, Inc., between 1919 and 1939, such as Junior General Science, Elementary General Science (1919) and Everyman's Science. Hodgdon died in Santa Barbara, California, on March 7, 1957.
