= Contemporary Club of Newark =

Contemporary Club of Newark was the largest club in the New Jersey State Federation of Women's Clubs (NJSFWC). It was founded on March 2, 1909, in Newark, New Jersey. While Ida Wharton Dawson served as its president, its membership of 1,500 made it one of the largest in the General Federation of Women's Clubs.

== Establishment ==
On March 2, 1909, a meeting was called in South Park Church by the Sesame Club to which representatives from various other clubs, such as the Philomathean, Irving, Saturday, and Municipal Art Clubs were invited. The purpose of this meeting was to form a large organization, one which should through united action in common interests work steadily toward a better knowledge of civic conditions and for the development of sympathetic good fellowship among women. When on April 23, the proposed constitution and by-laws were accepted, the Contemporary Club was officially founded.

== History ==
In 1913, a social hygiene movement was instituted and a Housewives League was organized. In 1914, the club gave the city its first municipal Christmas tree. An Industrial School for Girls, the education of defectives, a Better Babies campaign, and the founding of a State College for Women were actively advocated in 1914. A pure food campaign, which resulted in a special investigation of bakeries, of City Beautiful campaign, and the opening of a Boarding Home for Girls were among the things achieved directly or indirectly in 1915.

In the years 1916–17, the Contemporary succeeded in having women placed on governing boards of institutions for the insane, waged campaigns for the prevention of cigarette selling to minors, and devoted their energies to war relief.

During 1917–18, the club worked for Mothers' Pensions, for Child Welfare and Delinquency, for Censorship of Moving Pictures, for Emergency Relief, for Conservation, and for Mother Craft. Direct accomplishments of the club were the inauguration of an improved method of garbage collection in the city and the improvement of two public baths.

The club took an active part in Newark's 250th anniversary. Miss Hays, one of its members, was a member of the Celebration Committee. It was due to her insistent enthusiasm that the pageant in Weequahic Park was held. This had its permanent outgrowth in the organization for pageant purposes of many foreign groups who perpetuated, in this city, their charming old-time customs, festivals, and pageants.

Moving pictures were censored before being shown. Community singing was inaugurated and fostered by The Contemporary Club. Art, drama, and literature had their proper places. A radio was provided for soldiers at Fox Hill Army General Hospital at Staten Island. Colors for the Abraham Lincoln Post were secured and presented.

The club carried on a Student Self-Help Bureau, obtaining part-time work for students unable to continue school without assistance until the establishment of the vocational bureau.

A citation was received from Washington, D.C. for gathering weekly statistics on the price of commodities in different parts of the city at the request of the United States Department of Agriculture for the Study of Port Newark authorities.

The Girls' Survey inaugurated the cooperation of all organizations doing girls' recreational work and with cooperation still as their purpose The Contemporary called together again all agencies for a study of the dance hall problem in order that dance halls might be run without danger to young men and women.

The Newark Public Library and the Newark Museum Associations profited from the club's cooperation.
