= Mrs. L. Dow Balliett =

American writer, clubwoman (1847–1929)

Sarah Joanna Dennis Balliett
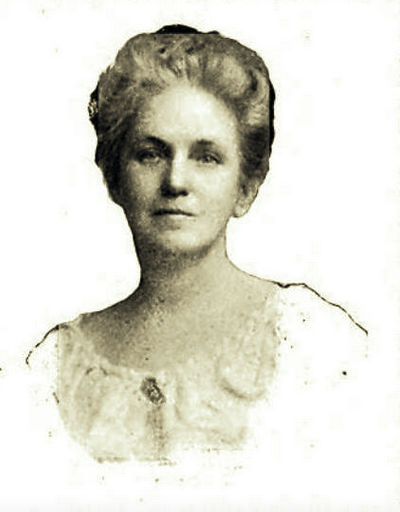
- Sarah Joanna Dennis Balliett (Scannell's, 1917)
- Born: Sarah Joanna Dennis; March 1, 1847; Mays Landing, New Jersey, U.S.
- Died: December 11, 1929 (aged 82); Atlantic City, New Jersey, U.S.
- Resting place: Pleasantville cemetery
- Occupations: writer; clubwoman
- Spouse: Lorenzo Dow Balliett (m. 1872; died 1928)
- Writing career
- Pen name: Mrs. L. Dow Balliett
- Genre: occult
- Subject: numerology

Sarah Joanna Dennis Balliett (pen name, Mrs. L. Dow Balliett; March 1, 1847 – December 11, 1929) was an American writer who created the modern style of numerology. An avid clubwoman, since her school days, she devoted herself to philosophic and civic affairs. In DuBois, Pennsylvania, Balliett was the first president of The Round Table Club. In Atlantic City, New Jersey, she was the founder and first president of the Women's Research Club; first president of the Atlantic County Historical Society; and president of the Women's Homeopathic Club of Atlantic City. She also served as principal of the School of Psychology and Physical Culture of Private Pupils of Atlantic City. Balliett was the author of several books as well as the co-editor of Early History of Atlantic County, New Jersey: Record of the First Year's work of Atlantic County's Historical Society. Drayer (2013) referred to Balliett as "The First Mother of Numerology".

== Early life and education ==
Sarah Joanna Dennis was born near Mays Landing, New Jersey, on March 1, 1847. Her parents were Joel Dennis (1799–1856) and Sarah Ann (Risley) (1810–1892). Her Quaker mother's motto, to "Leave the place where you stop the better for your having been there", has been the motto of Balliett's career. Balliett was a descendant of the early settlers in New Jersey, and the names of Hancock, Ballinge, Dole, Somers, Lake, Frambes, and Dennis figure in her line. Balliett's siblings were: Margaret Risley (b. 1830), Susan M. (b. 1832), Mark Wesley (b. 1834), Rebecca Caroline (b. 1837), Mary Ann (b. 1839), David Duffell (b. 1841), Elizabeth Garwood (b. 1844), Charles Edwin (b. 1853), and Harry Joel (b. 1857).

She was educated in public and private schools.

== Career ==
Balliett founded the Women's Research Club and was its first President. At the State Convention of the New Jersey Women's Clubs, her name was put on the State Founder's list. She served on the New Jersey State Federation of Women's Clubs as Director of Music.

Balliett was the first President of "The Round Table" Club of DuBois, Pennsylvania. She was one of the earliest workers in the Woman's Christian Temperance Union (W.C.T.U.) in DuBois, and assisted in the organization of the local Union in Clearfield County, Pennsylvania, where she resided at the time. She also organized the first Temperance Cadets, which reached a membership of more than 200 boys.

After arriving in Atlantic City in 1894, her activities were as marked. A pioneer in women's club work, she helped select the "little blue pin" of the General Federation of Women's Clubs. When the Atlantic County Historical Society was established in 1914, she was made its first President. For seven years, she was President of the Women's Homeopathic Club of Atlantic City. In 1911, in Atlantic City, she became the Principal of the School of Psychology and Physical Culture of Private Pupils.

Her writings were on subjects related to music, mysticism, and movement therapies, as well as occultism. Among her books were The Body Beautiful: According to the Delsartian Philosophy (1901); How to attain success through the strength of vibration; a System of Numbers as Taught by Pythagoras (1904); The philosophy of numbers; their tone and colors (1908); Nature's Symphony, Or, Lessons in Number Vibration (1911); The day of wisdom according to number vibration (1917); and The Balliett Philosophy of Number Vibration in Questions and Answers: A Text Book (1930). She also co-edited, in 1915, Early History of Atlantic County, New Jersey: Record of the First Year's work of Atlantic County's Historical Society, with Laura Lavinia Thomas Willis and Mrs. M. R. M. Fish.

Balliett also made portraits and was invited to exhibit at the World's Columbian Exposition (Chicago, 1893).

== Personal life ==
On August 15, 1872, at Delanco Township, New Jersey, she married Lorenzo Dow Balliett (d. 1928), M.D. son of Levi and Elizabeth (Follmer) Balliett, of Milton, Pennsylvania.

Balliett was friends with Julia Seton Sears, founder of The New Age Thought Church and School.

Sarah Joanna Dennis Balliett died December 11, 1929, in Atlantic City. Burial was in the Pleasantville cemetery.

== Selected works ==
=== Author ===
- The Body Beautiful: According to the Delsartian Philosophy (1901) (text)
- How to attain success through the strength of vibration; a System of Numbers as Taught by Pythagoras (1904) (text)
- The philosophy of numbers; their tone and colors (1908) (text)
- Nature's Symphony, Or, Lessons in Number Vibration (1911) (text)
- The day of wisdom according to number vibration (1917) (text)
- The Balliett Philosophy of Number Vibration in Questions and Answers: A Text Book (1930) (text)

=== Co-editor ===
- Early History of Atlantic County, New Jersey: Record of the First Year's work of Atlantic County's Historical Society (with Laura Lavinia Thomas Willis and Mrs. M. R. M. Fish; 1915) (text)
