= With a Little Help from My Friends (disambiguation) =

"With a Little Help from My Friends" is a song by the Beatles.

With a Little Help from My Friends may also refer to:

- With a Little Help from My Friends (Joe Cocker album), 1969
- With a Little Help from My Friends (Lu Elliott album), 1968
- With a Little Help from My Friends (Neal Morse album), 2007
- With a Little Help from My Friends, an album by Larry Carlton, 1969
- With a Little Help from My Friends, an album by Steve Cropper, 1969
- With a Little Help from My Friends, an album by Toto, 2021
- With a Little Help from My Friends, a 1993 book by Beatles producer George Martin with William Pearson

== See also ==
- With a Little Help from My Fwends, a 2014 album by the Flaming Lips
