= Key Club (disambiguation) =

Key Club is an international service organization for high school students.

Key Club may also refer to:

- A private nightclub
- Key Club (jazz club), jazz venue in Newark, New Jersey
- Key Club Recording Company, recording facility in Benton Harbor, Michigan
