= Halsey Street (Newark) =

Street in Newark, New Jersey, United States

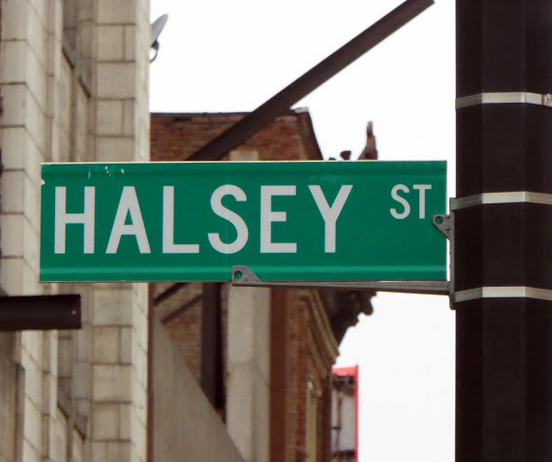
Street sign for Halsey Street

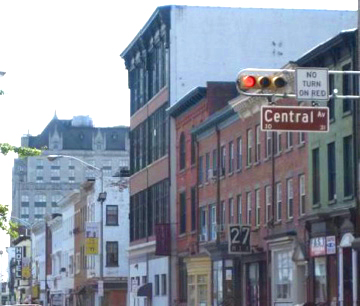
South from Central Avenue

Halsey Street is a north-south street in Downtown Newark, New Jersey, which runs between and parallel to Broad Street and Washington Street. Halsey Street passes through the four of city's historic districts: James Street Commons at the north, the abutting Military Park and Four Corners and, after a two block break, Lincoln Park at the south.

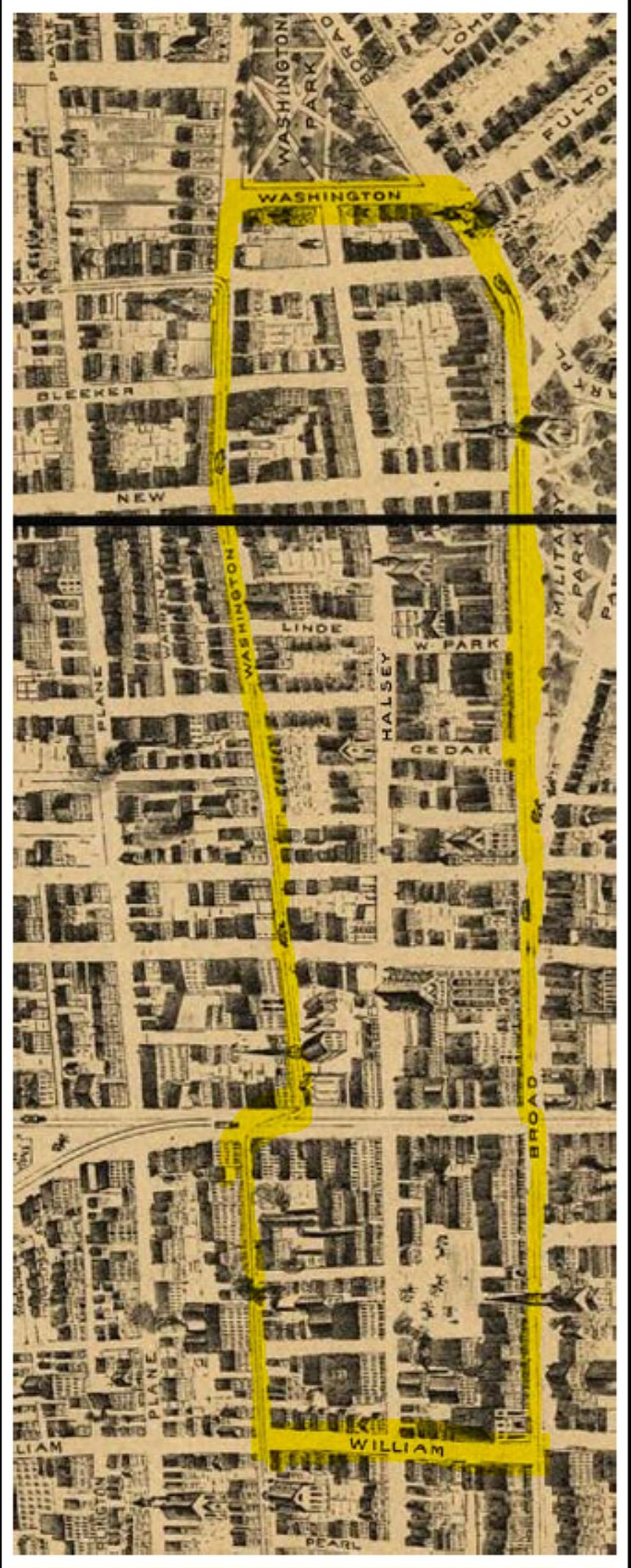
Inset of Newark Central Business District in the 1890s. As of 2023, new businesses bounded by Washington Place, Washington Street, and Broad Street and William are eligible for a grant program to encourage additional retail, dining and nightlife.

== History ==
Halsey Street lies within the original settlement of Newark which was laid out soon after its founding in 1666: the land was part of the plots distributed among the first settlers. It became a street during the early part of the 19th century during a period of great expansion. It is named for William Halsey (1770–1843), who served as first Mayor of Newark (1836–1837) after reincorporation as a city.

During the city's Gilded Age, a boom period at the turn of the 20th century in the Roaring Twenties, many low-rise homes were replaced by new commercial buildings, including several department stores, such as Hahne and Company, Kresge-Newark, Bamberger's, S. Klein and Orbachs.

In the 1950s, the city planned to convert Halsey between Market Street and Harriet Tubman Square into a retail pedestrian plaza to bolster the retail anchors and smaller shops Downtown and limit automobile traffic, but it never came to fruition.

Halsey and its side streets have long been the one of city's corridors for shopping, dining, and entertainment. Since the 2000s, the street has undergone a revival as new projects have generated renewed residential, cultural and commercial activities, including a restaurant row. The city's 2008 Living Downtown master plan helped kickstart development in the 2000s and was part of a greater Newark trend in pursuing a vibrant downtown. In 2023 the city introduced incentives to stimulate rental of storefronts along Halsey and adjacent streets. As of the 2020s, it is home to a growing number of small independent retail, dining, arts, and nightlife establishments.

In 2025, the Black-owned high-fidelity-audio wine and listening bar Consigliere, owned by two Newark attorneys, opened in the retail reactivation area.

== Description ==
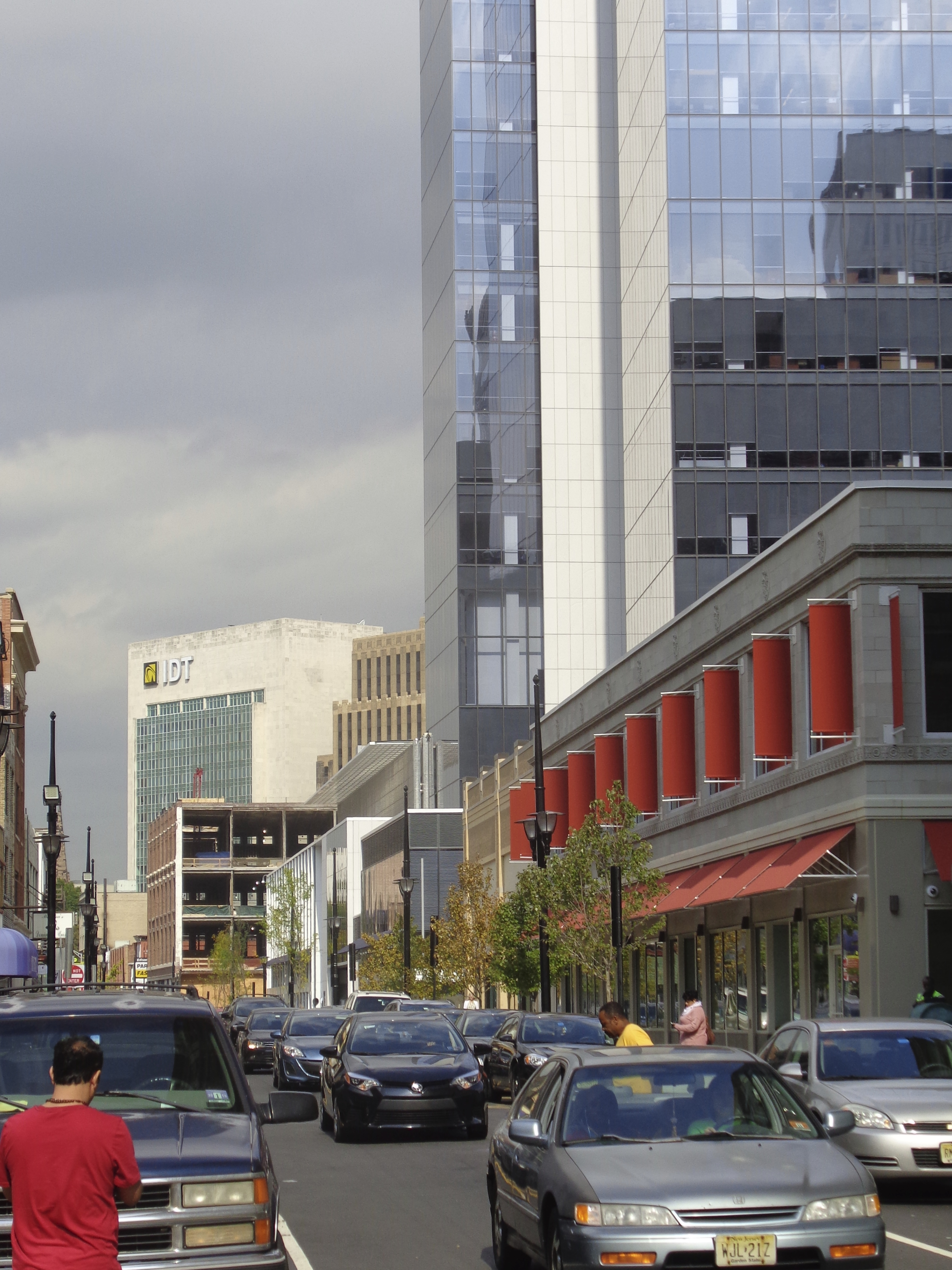
North from Cedar Street

=== North of Market Street ===
North of Market Street to Harriet Tubman Square numerous row-houses from the earlier era are still found on Halsey and neighboring streets. 31 Central is home to an artists' collective and the LGBTQ Center. There are plans to replace it with a new residential and retail building. The stretch between Central and New Street has sited street festivals since 2010. Rutgers-Newark, whose campus begins in the neighborhood and lies to the west in University Heights, opened its Honors Living/Learning Center, with an interior public plaza, at Halsey between New and Linden Streets in 2022.

==== The Hahnes building ====
Ground was broken on the renovation of the Hahnes building in 2015, for adaptive reuse as educational, residential, and retail spaces. A six-story addition was built on the Halsey Street side, featuring close to 100 apartments and an underground parking garage.

Rutgers opened a new arts and cultural center on three floors of the Halsey Street annex in 2017. Called "Express Newark," it includes an 'arts incubator,' media center, design consortium, print shop, portrait studio, and lecture hall, as well as exhibition and performance spaces. The center is home to the annual AAPI Jazz Fest. The project also includes a Whole Foods, Barnes & Noble, Petco, CitiMD Urgent Care, and a restaurant by celebrity chef Marcus Samuelsson called Marcus B & P. In 2024, Samuelsson opened Vibe BBQ at the location.

==== Prudential headquarters area ====
Halston Flats, a restored former industrial building at Raymond Boulevard converted to apartments with retail/restaurants on the ground floor, opened in 2017. The Kresge building, now home to Newark Public Schools, was once a stop on the Cedar Street Subway, part of Newark's extensive streetcar system. The S.Klein buildings was demolished to make way for a new tower that is part of Prudential Headquarters complex, which has been based in the district since the company's founding in the 19th century. The Bambergers building, now called 165 Halsey Street, has become an internet exchange point housing numerous computer systems including DE-CIX New York and Lexent Metro Connect. The New Jersey Motion Picture & Television Commission is in the Gibraltar Building on Halsey.

=== SoMa area ===
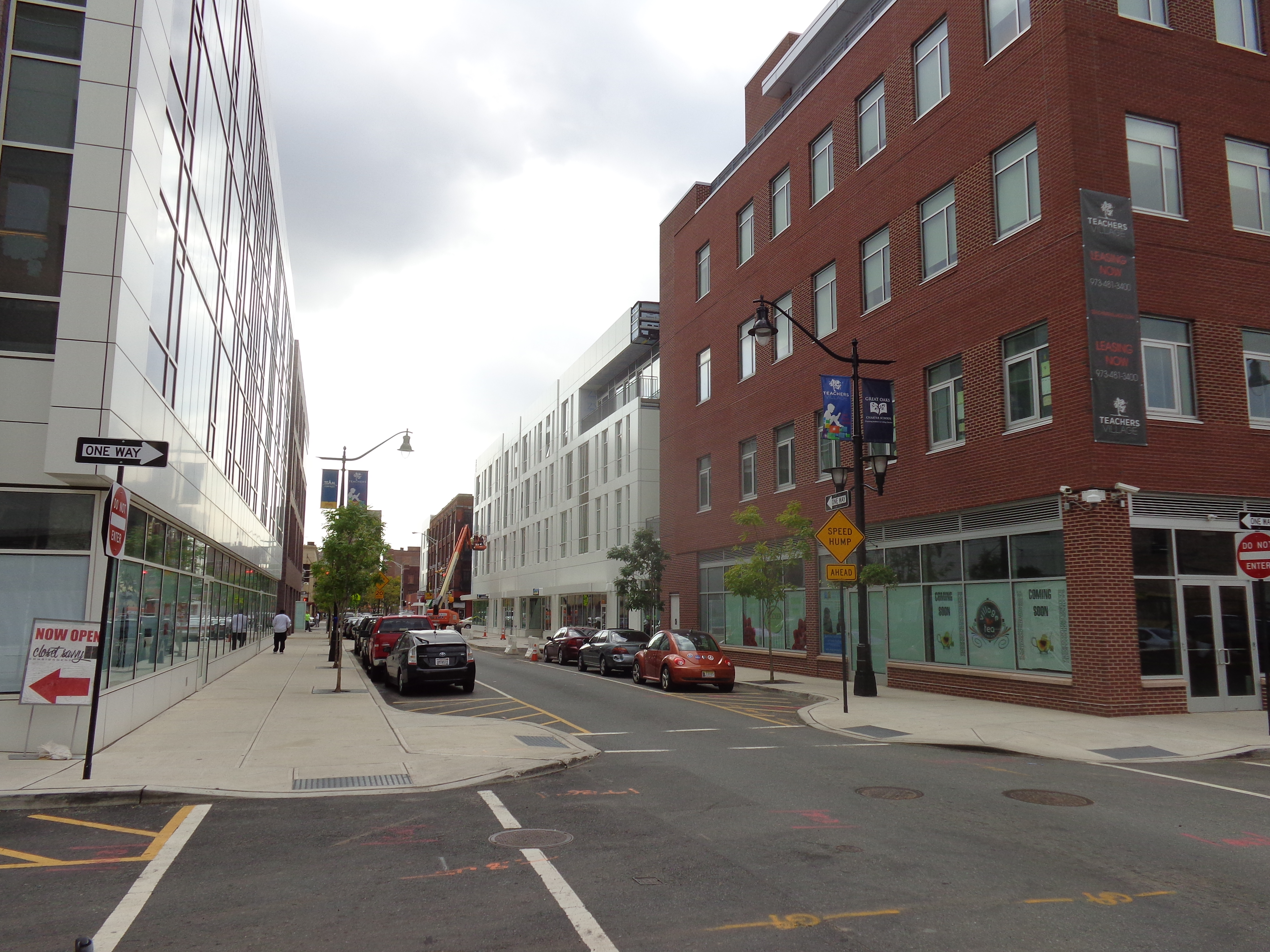
At Maiden Lane in Teachers Village

The area south of Market Street, dubbed SoMa by developers, includes the Teachers Village neighbourhood. This area is undergoing development following a revitalization master plan design and work completed in 2018 by Newark native Richard Meier which in turn has stimulated other building and renovation projects. It is home to Hobby's, a landmark delicatessen luncheonette, and new restaurants, shops, and a planned Eataly-style food marketplace. For much of the 20th century, the neighborhood was an entertainment district, including cinemas and the venues The Key Club and Sparky J's. The Newark Female Charitable Society is a group of historic buildings on Halsey at Hill Street.

=== Lincoln Park area ===
Halsey stops for two blocks, the street grid having been broken during a period of urban renewal along Nevada Street. It then continues into the Lincoln Park neighborhood, former home of the radio station WNSW and of the art gallery City Without Walls. This stretch of the street is more residential. Since the new millennium, many new multi-family apartment buildings have been constructed, including a project built using shipping containers and other housing developments that are "fully affordable". New two-family homes have been built on adjacent streets. Plans have been announced for the development of the Facade, an outdoor performance space, on the grounds of the South Park Calvary United Presbyterian Church. At its southern end is the Catedral Evangelica Reformada.

An alleyway that sits in the middle of Lincoln Park’s “Little Five Points” (a convergence of Lincoln Park Place, Crawford Street, South Halsey Street, Bleeker Street, and Washington Street) was converted in 2021 to an open-air art area.

=== Additional information ===
In June 2020, a stretch of the street was painted with All Black Lives Matter.

In the fall of 2023, the city launched the Newark Retail Reactivation Initiative. To stimulate rental of empty storefronts the program makes monetary grants to qualifying businesses along Halsey Street corridor within the zone bordered by Broad Street to the east, Washington Street to the west, Washington Place to the north and William Street to the south.

On October 28, 2023, a portion of Halsey Street that intersects Academy Street was renamed Sakia Gunn Way, in honor of Sakia Gunn, a 15-year old lesbian whose murder in 2003 led to increased visibility of Newark's LGBTQ+ community and spurred the creation of various community organizations.

== Gallery ==
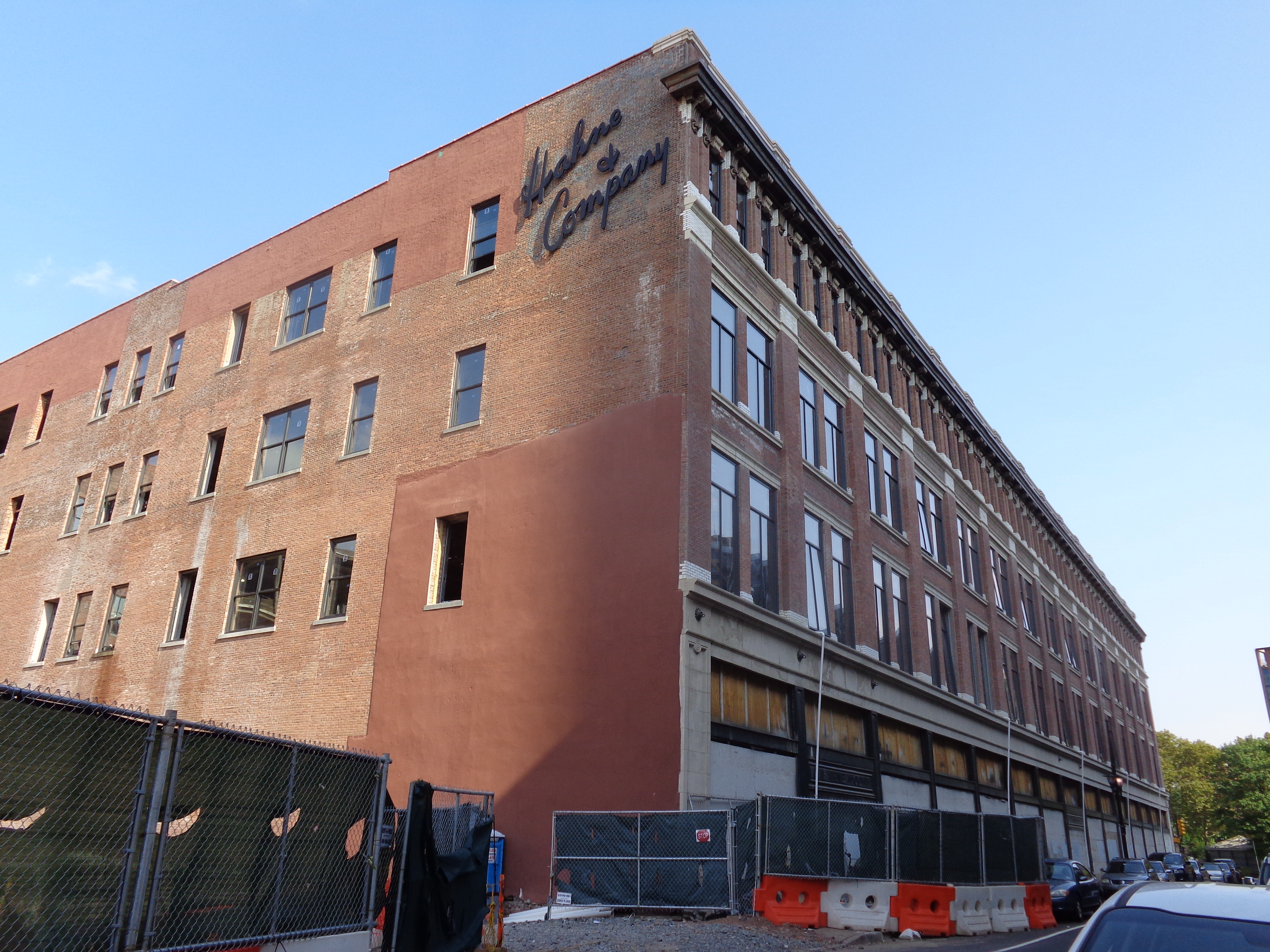
Hahnes and Company Building

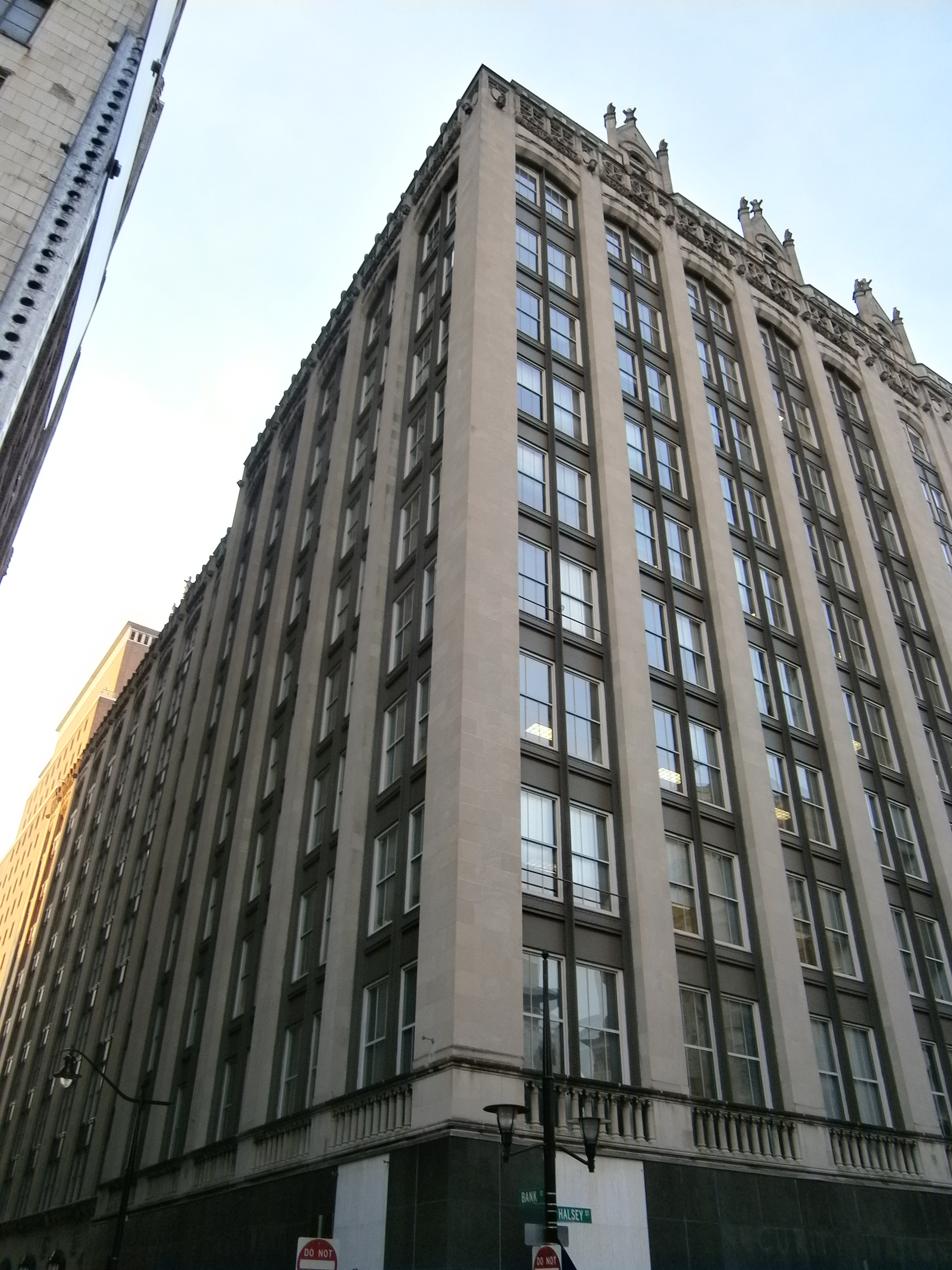
Gibraltar Building

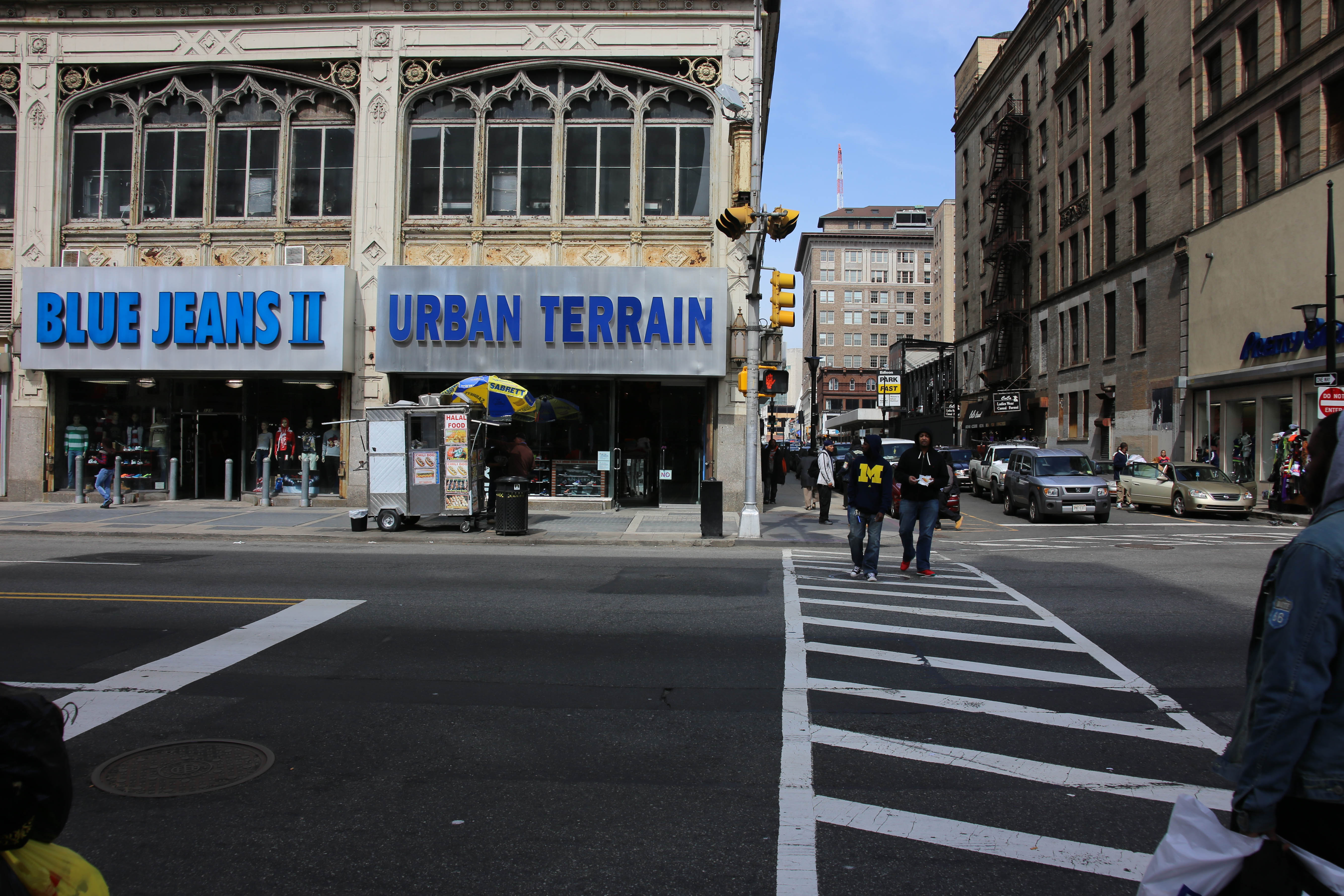
Halsey at Market

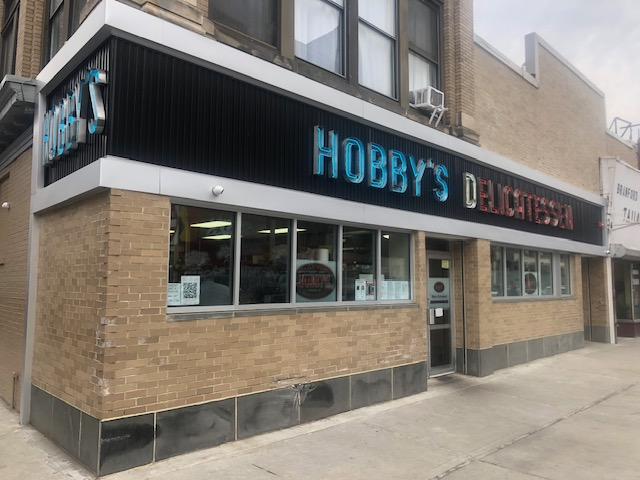
Hobby’s Delicatessen

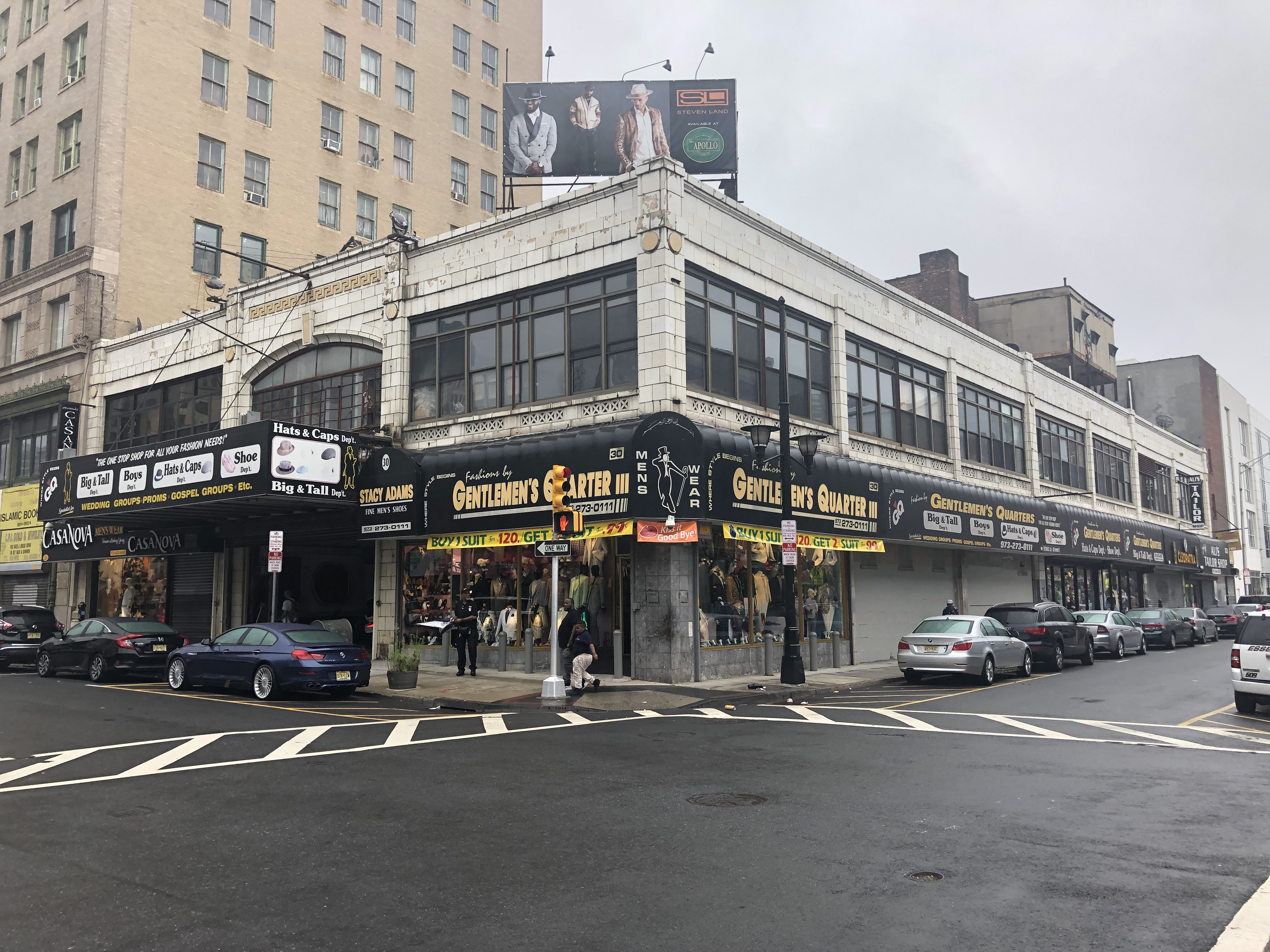
Former Adams Theatre

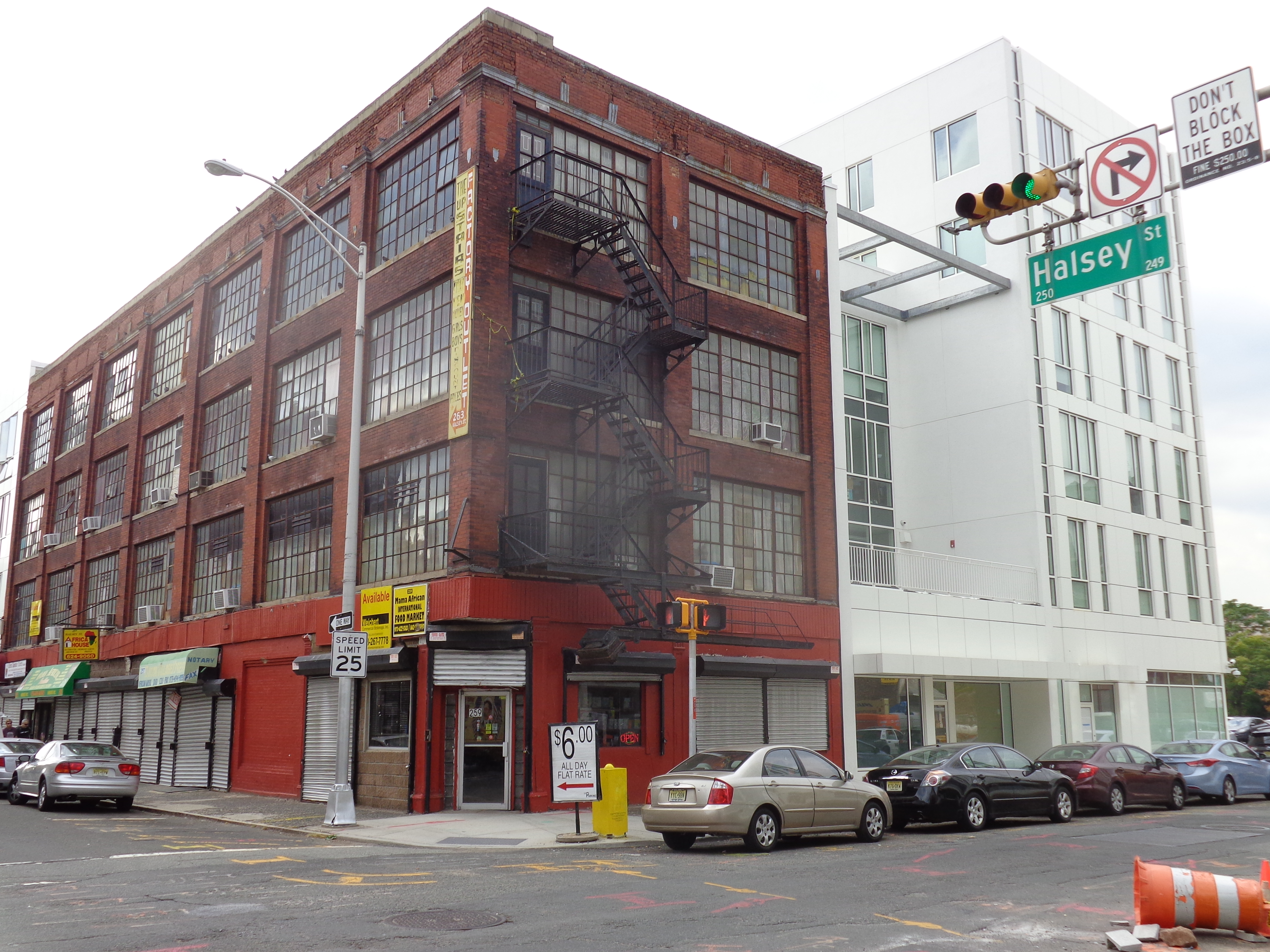
Halsey at William

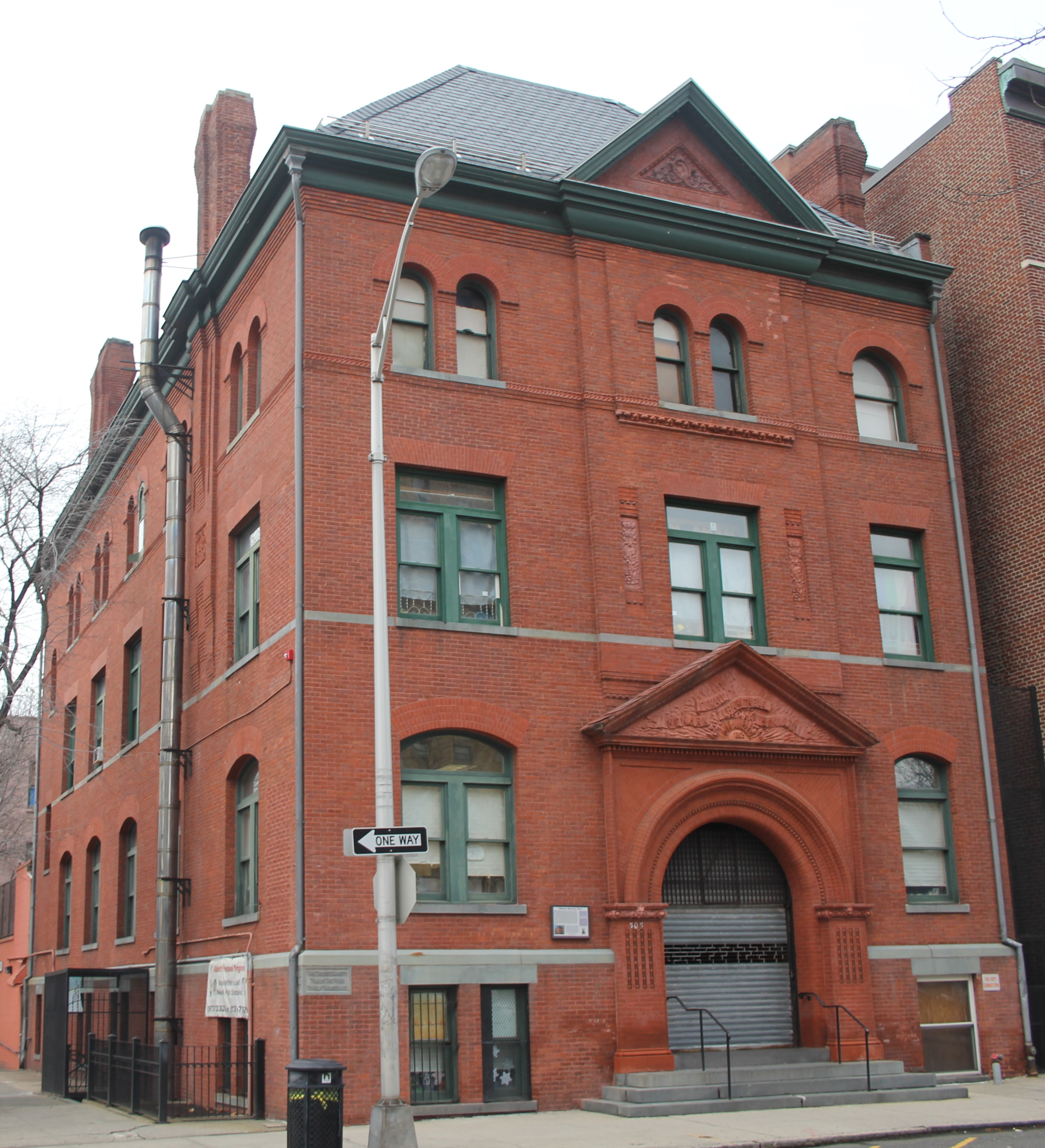
Female Charitable Society at Hill Street

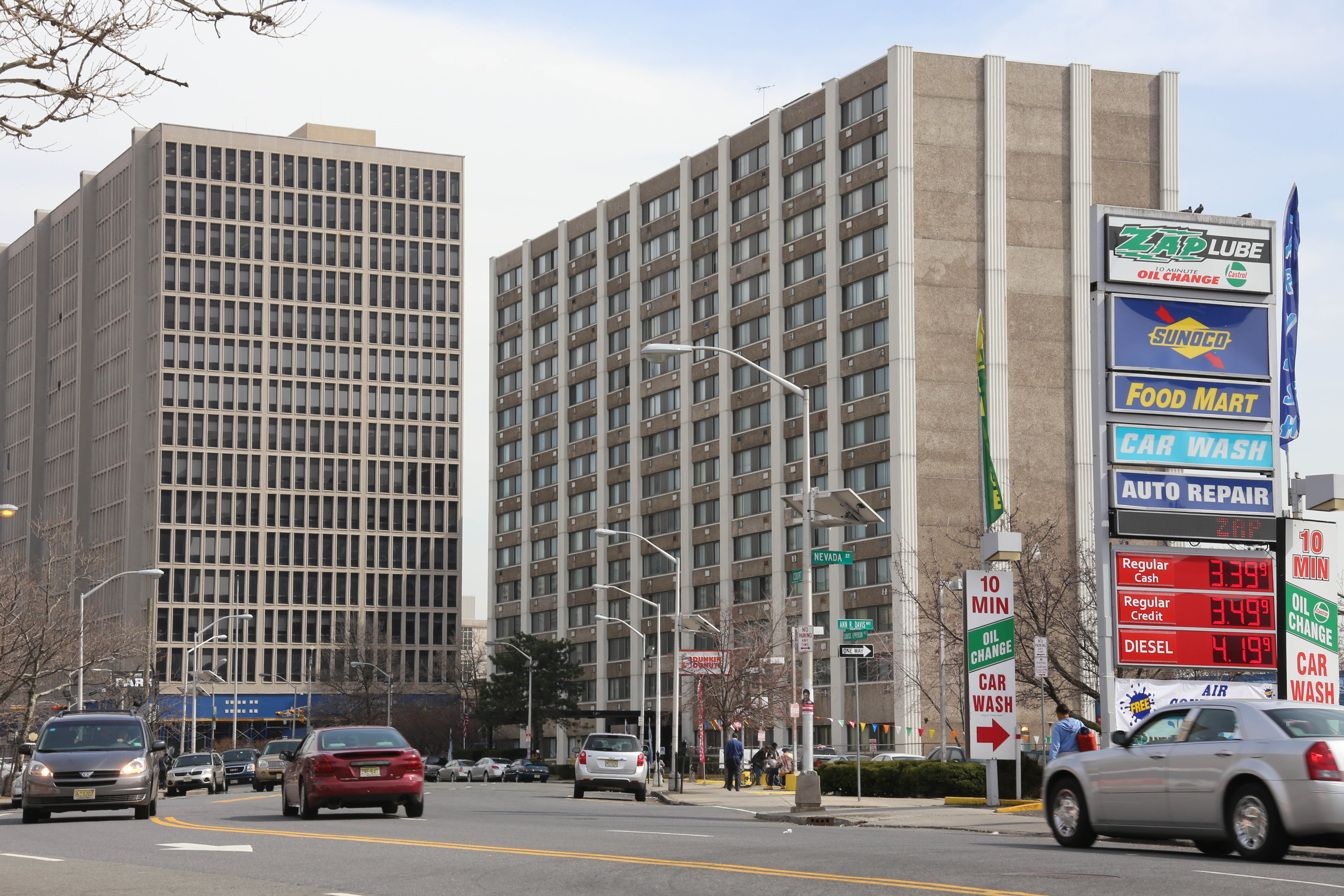
View east of Court Street at Nevada Street

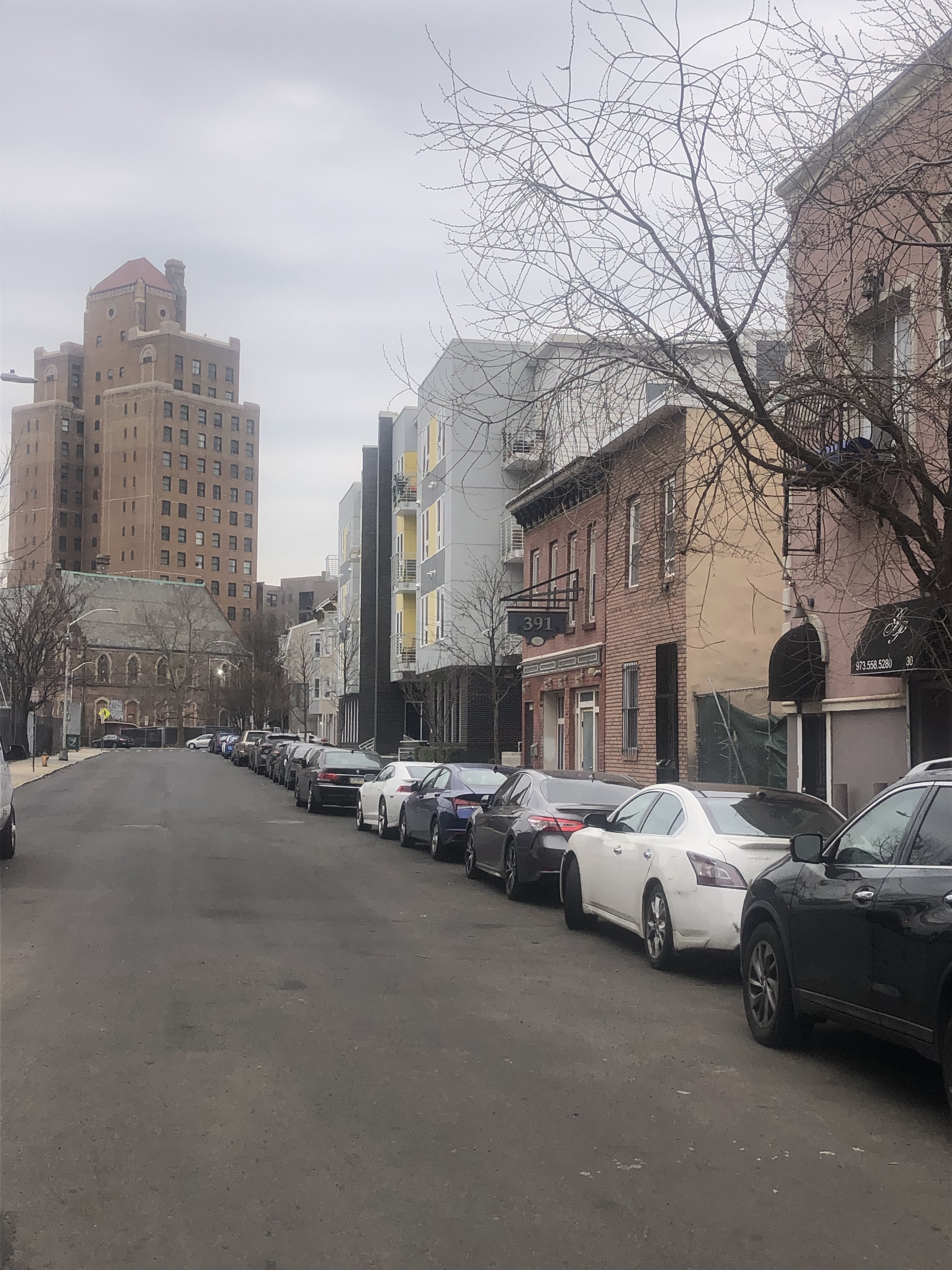
Halsey at West Kinney

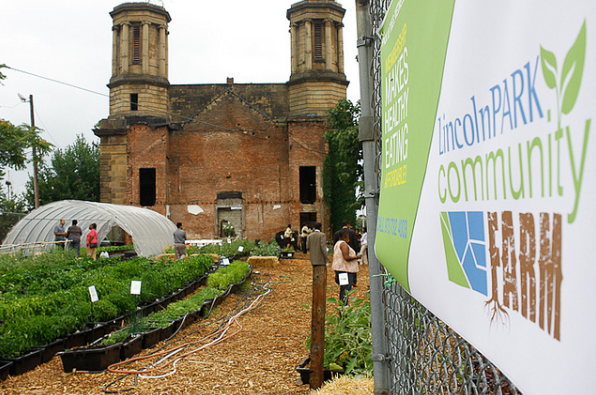
South Park Calvary United Presbyterian Church Facade

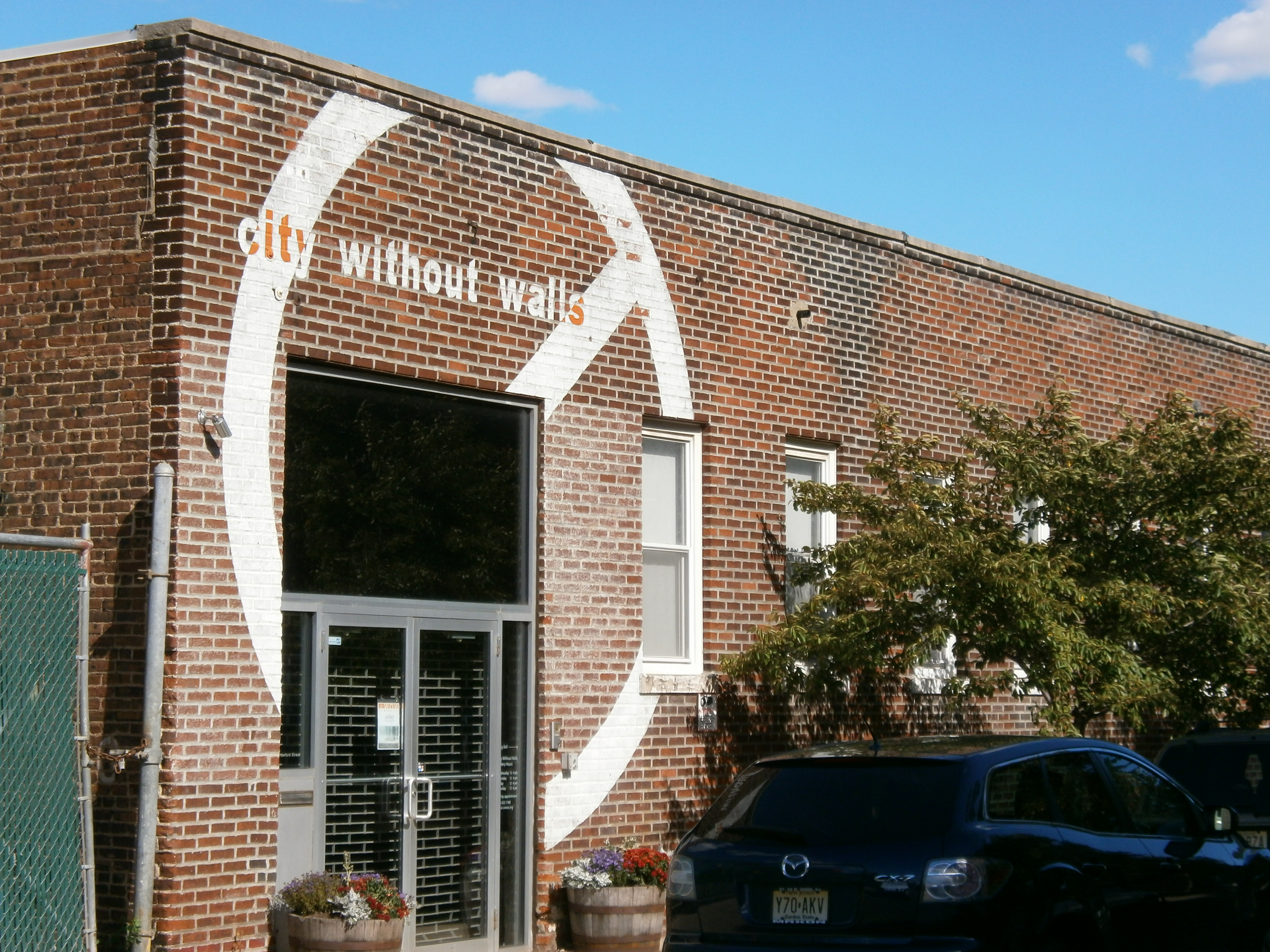
City Without Walls Gallery (cWOW)

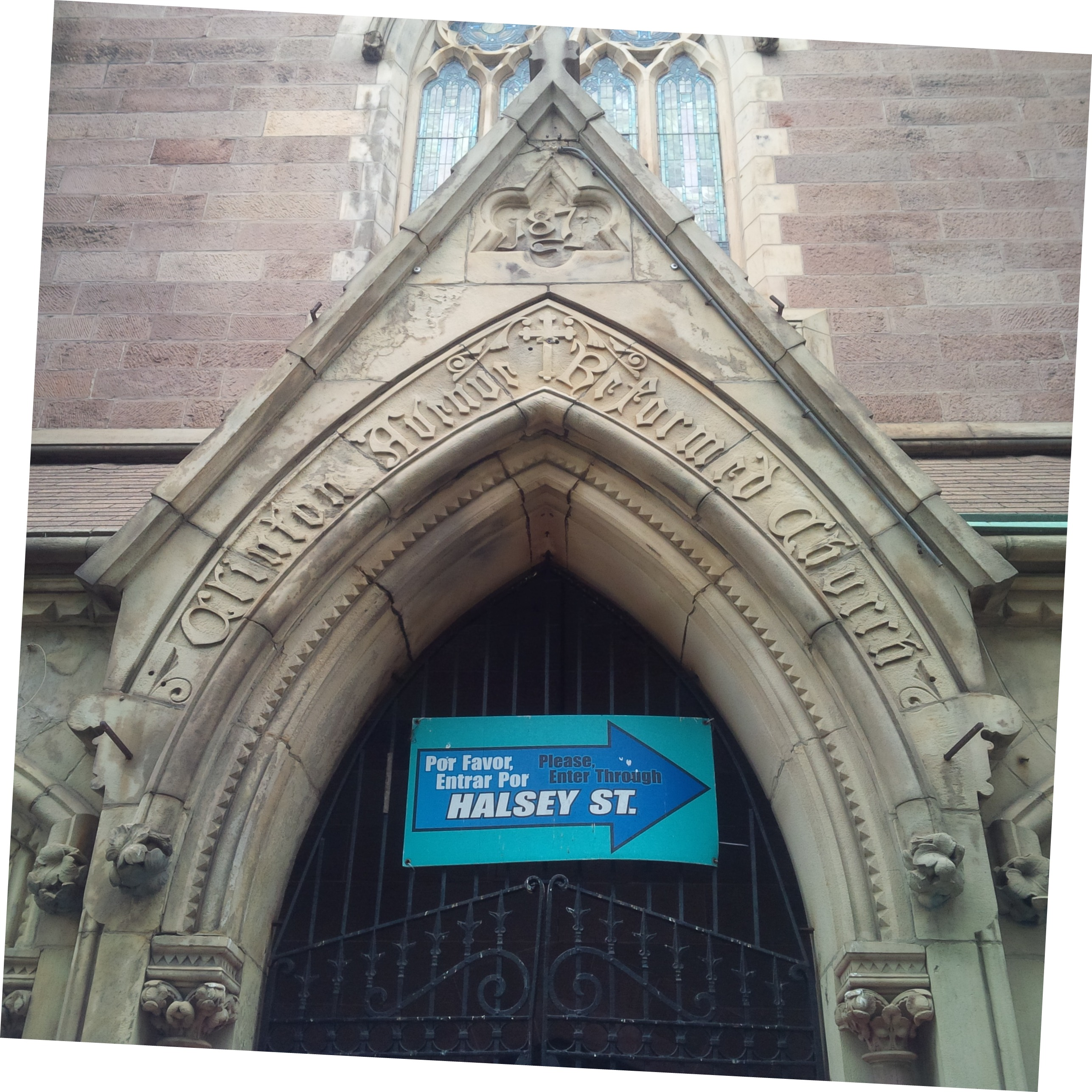
Catedral Evangelica Reformada

== See also ==
- Ferry Street (Newark)
- McCarter Highway
- List of tallest buildings in Newark
