= Sings Way Out from Down Under =

Studio album by Lu Elliott
- Released: 1967
- Genres: Jazz, Soul
- Labels: ABC; ABC 584, ABCS 584
- Producers: Johnny Pate (arranger and conductor)

Lu Elliott chronology
Sings Way Out from Down Under (1967)	With a Little Help from My Friends (1968)

Sings Way Out from Down Under was the first of two ABC albums for jazz singer Lu Elliott. It featured songs such as "I've Got You Under My Skin", "Some Other Town", and "I Was a Fool".

== Background ==
The album was released in 1967 by ABC Records. It was dedicated to Elliott's Australian audience stemming from her time in Australia. The arrangements for the album were by Johnny Pate.

"I Love the Ground You Walk On", produced by Johnny Pate and Lou Zito, was released as a single in February 1967.

== Review ==
A short review of the album in the December 2 issue of Billboard magazine said that Elliott handled soul numbers such as "Speaking of Happiness" with deep emotion and she could handle a lyric with the best of them. It also received a rave review from Hi Fidelity magazine. It mentioned that most of the soul sisters that derive from Dinah Washington were a terrible drag but Lu Elliott was an exception who could twist the tail of a song when it was appropriate.

== Track listing ==
A side

- "I've Got You Under My Skin" (Cole Porter) – 2:25
- "Have You Tried to Forget?" (Johnny Pate) – 2:31
- "Speaking of Happiness" (B. Scott, J. Radcliffe) – 2:38
- "When I Fall in Love" (E. Heyman, V. Young) – 2:35
- "Somewhere Along the Line" (Sanford, Lee) – 2:35
- "I Love the Ground You Walk On" (B. Stevenson, J. Cordae) – 2:35

B side

- "And We Were Lovers" (J. Godlsmith, L. Bricusse) – 2:45
- "The Lind of Love I Need" (H. Bailin, F. Tishman) – 2:40
- "Some Other Town" (Snookie Matthews, Sr.) – 2:33
- "I Was a Fool" (Johnny Pate) – 3:15
- "Around the World" (Young; Adamson) – 3:25
