= Ida Wharton Dawson =

American social worker and clubwoman (1860–1928)

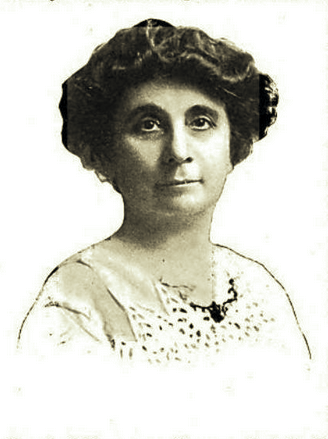
Ida Wharton Dawson (1917)

Ida Wharton Dawson (July 3, 1860 – May 18, 1928) was an American social worker and clubwoman. Her activities were in the recent club and uplift movements of the state, serving as President of the New Jersey State Federation of Women's Clubs.

== Early life and education ==
Ida Amelia Wharton was born at Newark, New Jersey, July 3, 1860. Her parents were John and Mary A. (Greenwald) Wharton. Her siblings were Josephine (b. 1849), Charles (b. 1851), Mary (b. 1853), and Anna (b. 1865). Dawson was of English descent on her father's side and French on her mother's. The house in which the generations were reared since 1796 was located on Kingsland Street on the banks of the Yantacaw Brook, Nutley, New Jersey. The land on which it stood was part of a grant made in 1668 to Major Nathaniel Kingsland of Barbados. His West Indies products were sent to the New York markets. His sea-faring associates brought back such glowing stories of New Jersey's richness in soil and scenic beauty, that he asked for a grant of land in what is now the Nutley region, which was given to him. The old homestead was built by a nephew of his in 1796; and, modernized with later-day conveniences, was occupied by his descendants until after the beginning of the 20th century. A grandmother of Dawson helped to start the first Sunday School opened in New York City.

Dawson was educated in the public schools and at Houghton Seminary, in Clinton, Oneida County, New York.

== Career ==
Upon leaving school, she began civic work by joining the Newark Female Charitable Society's board of managers. She organized its Registration Department and was a member of its building committee when it began its industrial relief work.

In the Bureau of Associated Charities, she was chair of its district conference; she also organized and was president of its Friendly Visitors Conference, where the problems of poverty, their cause, and cure, were worked out for the first time in Newark.

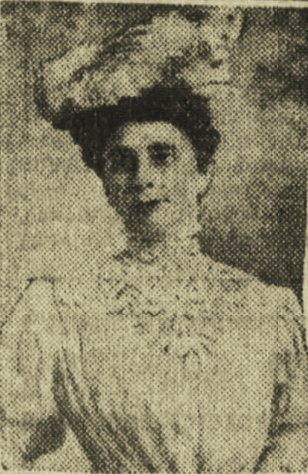
Ida Wharton Dawson (1908)

Dawson served as president of the New Jersey State Federation of Women's Clubs, reorganizing the federation as to methods and departments of work.

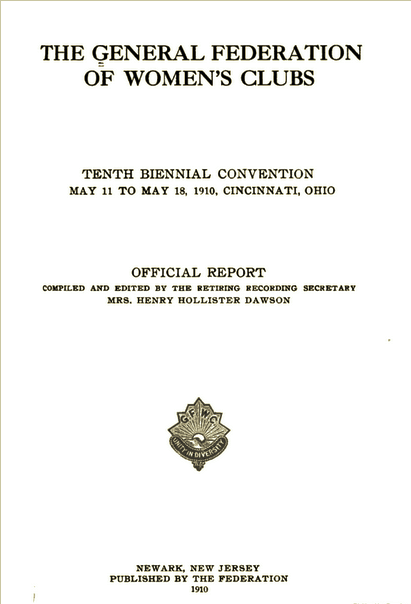
Official Report

In 1910, Dawson was recording secretary of the General Federation of Women's Clubs when it numbered 2,000,000 in membership, and in that role, she compiled and edited the report of the official proceedings of its tenth biennial convention.

She was an organizer and served as president of the Contemporary Club of Newark and as president of the Sesame (Women's) Club which was one of the two clubs founding The Contemporary. The Contemporary's membership of 1,500 made it one of the largest in the Federation of Women's Clubs in the U.S. During her tenure, Dawson organized its civic work. One result was the Girls' Industrial School in Newark which was taken under the wing of the City Board of Education. The Industrial School was designed to meet the needs of girls leaving grammar schools to enter industrial life. Several hundred women were trained in civic work, through this civic department of The Contemporary Club while Dawson was president. The Women's Housing Association opened the first hotel in Newark for working girls, known as the Caroline, and had entire charge of it. It was conducted on a purely business basis and not as a philanthropy.

In her work as vice president of the Women's Auxiliary of the YMCA of Newark, Dawson was especially interested in mothers' meetings where home training for the young was considered. As a member of the committee of 100 in the celebration in 1916 of the 250th birthday of Newark, she rendered assistance to its Historical and Literary sub-Committee. She was also a director in the Bureau of Associated Charities and was secretary of the Women's Housing Association.

== Personal life ==
She married at Newark, on May 7, 1890, Henry Hollister Dawson (born 1860). The couple had one child, a daughter, Mary (b. 1899).

Dawson was deeply interested in church work.

She had her summer home in Avon-by-the-Sea, New Jersey.

Ida Dawson died at her home in Orange, New Jersey, on May 18, 1928.

== Selected works ==
- Official Report, General Federation of Women's Clubs. Convention 1910. (text)
