= Julia Seton =

American physician and author

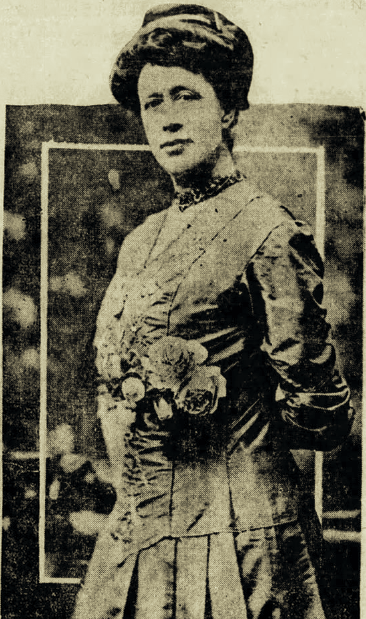
- (1914)

Personal life
- Born: Julia Lorinda Seton; December 27, 1862 Illinois, U.S.
- Died: April 27, 1950 (aged 87) Ocala, Florida, U.S.
- Children: 1
- Notable work: The Science of Success
- Education: Gross Medical University; Tufts Medical College
- Known for: numerology
- Other names: Julia Seton Kapp; Julia Seton Sears

Religious life
- Religion: New Thought
- Institute: New Civilization Church
- Profession: physician; lecturer; author; founder

Julia Seton (also Kapp and Sears; 1862–1950) was an American physician, lecturer and author. After graduating from medical school and working as a physician, Seton modernized the concept of "the Science of Names and Numbers" to what is referred to today as numerology, and it is through her work that numerology became known by the general public. She was friends with Sarah Balliett who created the modern style of numerology.

Seton's work represented a million and a half people, of whom 6,000-8,000 were confessed believers. She asserted that "New Thought was a religion", and she was its self-appointed high-priestess. According to Seton, New Thought was a product of the twentieth century thought and need and it had its birth in human experience and human enfoldment. Seton served the president of the New Thought School, Boston, Massachusetts, Brockton, Massachusetts, Brooklyn, New York, and Manhattan, New York. In 1905, she founded the New Civilization Church, in Santa Monica, California.

== Early life and education ==
Julia Lorinda Seton was born in Illinois, (Note: According to Seton's obituary in the Evening Star (1950), she was born in Chicago, while The National (1918), and Who's Who New England (1909) record her place of birth as Schuyler County, Illinois.) December 27, 1862. Her parents were Israel Marion and Jane Rhoda (Dickerson) Seton.

She was educated in the schools of Cleveland, Ohio, and Boston, Massachusetts. Subsequently, to teaching for five years in Ohio, she studied medicine, and in 1898, (Note: According to Who's Who in New York City (1909), Seton graduated from Gross Medical College in 1894.) was graduated M.D. at Gross Medical University (now, University of Colorado School of Medicine), Denver, Colorado. She pursued a post-graduate course in 1902–03 at Tufts Medical College, Boston.

== Career ==
Seton practiced as a medical physician until 1903.

Having been successful from childhood in applying subjective laws to objective expressions, her desire to deal more with the cause than with the effect impelled her to follow her inclinations and devote her life to metaphysical work. Beginning with a small class in Huntington Chambers, Boston, in 1904, she took larger quarters in Richards Hall a few months later.

In 1906, she went to New York City and commenced teaching and lecturing in a studio in Carnegie Hall. These quarters soon became inadequate for the Sunday service and in 1908, the Belasco Theatre was leased. In 1910, quarters were secured in the New York American building. That same year, Seton went to Europe and established in London the First New Thought Church and School of London. By the time Seton had returned to New York, the Sunday morning services of the New Thought Church in that city had moved to the Forty-eighth Street Theater and were attended by hundreds of people.

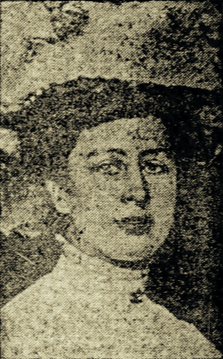
(1911)

Seton was the founder of the New Thought Summer School at the Home of the New Civilization, Oscawana-on-the-Hudson, New York. This was a school for students, post-graduate philosophers, scientists, metaphysicians, psychologists, and mystics. Self-healing and the higher physical, intellectual and spiritual unfoldment were taught, including such subjects as the following: "Science of Life," "Science of Success, "Laws of Self-Healing," "The Conquest of Poverty," "The Truth on Life and Death," "New Mysticism,' "Concentration," "Silence," "Public Speaking," Fundamentals of New Thought Church and School," "The Race Problem-Money" and "The New Civilization." The property of the Oscawana Association included 140 acres (57 ha) of woodland with walks, drives, trees, flowers, birds and running brooks. The grounds of the association were covered with tents and small bungalows, and a large inn. A teachers' class was held for those who wanted to qualify as instructors, teachers and preachers for the New Thought churches of the New Civilization. In addition, there were many associate teachers of philosophy and religion from different centers, and through this the student had the advantage of increased physical research.

Seton lectured at the League for the Larger Life in Washington, D.C., in 1923 after having completed a trip around the world covering a period of two years in which she visited every continent.

Seton's power of expression helped her to attain an enviable position as a writer of metaphysical literature. She was a prolific author of more than a dozen books. Her magazine articles appeared in Nautilus, Reality, Success, Aquarian Age, Rally (London), Liberty (Australia), and Woman's Way (New Zealand). She was a member of the Massachusetts Medical Society since 1903 and of the American Medical Association since 1908. Seton was also a member of the Denver Medical Society, and the Colorado Woman's Medical Association. She was the president of the New-Thought School in New York City and Boston. She was a member of the Silver State Circle No. 7, Women of Woodcraft.

== Personal life ==
She was twice married: (1) December 7, 1882, to Samuel Stephen Kapp (1859–1939), of Cleveland, Ohio; (2), November 16, 1903, in Denver, Colorado, to Franklin Warren Sears, pastor of New-Thought Church, New York City. After their divorce in 1914, she took again her maiden name of Julia Seton. There was one child by her first union: Dr. Juno Belle Kapp, wife of Dr. Roy Page Walton.

Julia Seton died in Ocala, Florida, April 27, 1950.

== Selected works ==
- Grapho-psychology, 1907 (text)
- Shells from Life-love-God, 1909 (text)
- Your Aura and Your Keynote, 1912
- Concentration, the Secret of Success, 1912 (text)
- Marriage, 1914
- The Race Problem-Money, 1914
- The Science of Success, 1914
- Methods of Obtaining Success, 1914 (text)
- The Psychology of the Solar Plexus and Sub-Conscious Mind, 1914 (text)
- Freedom Talks No. 1, 1915 (text)
- Freedom Talks No. 2, 1914 (text)
- Fundamental Principles of the New Civilization: New Thought; Student's Manual, 1916 (text)
- The Key to Health, Wealth & Love, 1917
- Destiny: A New-thought Novel, 1917 (text)
- The Emanation Body, 1918 (text)
- Helpful Thoughts, 1926
- Western Symbology, 1929
