= Sparky J's =

Jazz club in Newark, New Jersey

Sparky J's, previously known as the Cadillac Club, was a popular jazz club in downtown Newark, New Jersey. Sparky J's often featured soul jazz or funky jazz best exemplified by the organ combo, a band usually consisting of a Hammond B-3 organist, a saxophonist, a drummer, and a guitarist. The club was located in downtown Newark, on the corner of Halsey and William streets. This area known locally as the "Jazz Corner of the World" in the 70s because it contained two jazz clubs: Spark J's and Key Club. Both clubs closed in the 1970s, and they were the last full-time jazz clubs in the area at the time of closing. While Key Club was free entry, Sparky J's charged admission.

In the 1990s, the Newark Jazz Festival held annual Organ Jams, which were also known as "The Key Club and Sparky J's Reunion", which featured bands that played soul jazz as they did in the 70s. Many of the same musicians that played in the 70s played in these Festivals. Proceeds from the organ jam benefited the Black United Fund of New Jersey.

It was one of the jazz clubs featured on the "A Tribute to Newark Jazz Clubs" painting, a large-scale outdoor mural in Newark completed in 2013.

== Musicians and bands ==
Below is a selected list of musicians and band who played at least once at Sparky J's:
- George Benson
- Dizzy Gillespie
- Etta Jones
- Houston Person
- Gloria Coleman
- Jimmy McGriff
- Charles Earland
- Jack McDuff
- Trudy Pitts
- Pieces of a Dream
- Bill Doggett
- Jimmy Scott

== See also ==
- Clement's Place, jazz club in Newark, New Jersey
- WBGO, Newark jazz radio
