= Murder of Sakia Gunn =

Victims of an anti-LGBT hate crime

Sakia Gunn
- Born: May 26, 1987
- Died: May 11, 2003 (aged 15); Newark, New Jersey, U.S.
- Cause of death: Stabbing
- Known for: Murder victim

Sakia Gunn (May 26, 1987 – May 11, 2003) was a 15-year-old African American lesbian who was murdered in a hate crime in Newark, New Jersey. Richard McCullough was charged with her death and sentenced to 20 years in prison. In 2008 a documentary directed by Charles B. Brack titled, Dreams Deferred: The Sakia Gunn Film Project was released about Gunn's life, murder, and early legacy.

== Murder ==
On the night of May 11, 2003, Gunn was returning from a night out in Greenwich Village, Manhattan, with her friends and cousin. While waiting for the #1 New Jersey Transit bus at the corner of Broad and Market Streets in downtown Newark, Gunn and her friends were propositioned by two men, Richard McCullough and Allen Pierce. The girls rejected their advances and declared themselves to be lesbians. The men attacked; with McCullough grabbing one of Gunn's friends by the throat. Gunn fought back, and McCullough stabbed her in the chest. Both men immediately fled the scene in their vehicle. After Gunn's cousin, Valencia Bailey, flagged down a passing driver, she was taken to nearby University Hospital, where she died in the arms of Valencia Bailey in the parking lot of University Hospital.

== Sentencing ==
McCullough, who turned himself in to authorities several days later, was arrested in connection with the crime on May 16, 2003. In a plea bargain, the murder charges were dropped and, on March 3, 2005, McCullough pleaded guilty to aggravated manslaughter, aggravated assault, and bias intimidation, though claiming, at one point, that Gunn died after she "ran into his knife"; which was a lie. On April 21, 2005, he was sentenced to 20 years in prison. He was released from prison on May 13, 2020.

== Reaction and Gunn's legacy ==
Gunn's death was the subject of a two-day series in the Washington Post in October 2004 by Anne Hull, who spent months reporting on the lives of young lesbians in Newark in the aftermath of the hate crime that killed their friend. The series was finalist for the Pulitzer Prize in Feature Writing in 2005.

Using the LexisNexis database, Kim Pearson, a professor at The College of New Jersey compared the media coverage of Sakia Gunn's death to the 1998 murder of Matthew Shepard: 659 stories were found in major newspapers about Shepard's murder, compared to 21 articles about Gunn's murder in the subsequent seven months. Pearson noted that not only were Shepard's attackers tried and convicted during this period, but that it took nearly that long for Gunn's attacker to be indicted.

Gunn's death sparked outrage from the city's gay and lesbian community. The community, in conjunction with GLAAD, rallied the mayor's office, requesting, among other things, the establishment of a gay and lesbian community center, that police officers to patrol the Newark Penn Station/Broad Street corridor 24-hours a day, the creation of an LGBT advisory council to the mayor, and that the school board be held accountable for the lack of concern and compassion when dealing with students at Westside High School (which Gunn attended) immediately following the murder. The Newark Pride Alliance, an LGBT advocacy group, was founded in the wake of Gunn's murder.

In 2008, a documentary directed by Charles B. Brack was released about Gunn's murder, titled Dreams Deferred: The Sakia Gunn Film Project.

In 2016, a mural depicting Gunn was created along a portion of McCarter Highway in Newark. The mural, titled Sakia, Sakia, Sakia, Sakia, was created by artist and activist Tatyana Falalizadeh. The mural was part of a broader mural named Portraits, which was part of the Newark Downtown District’s Gateways to Newark initiative.

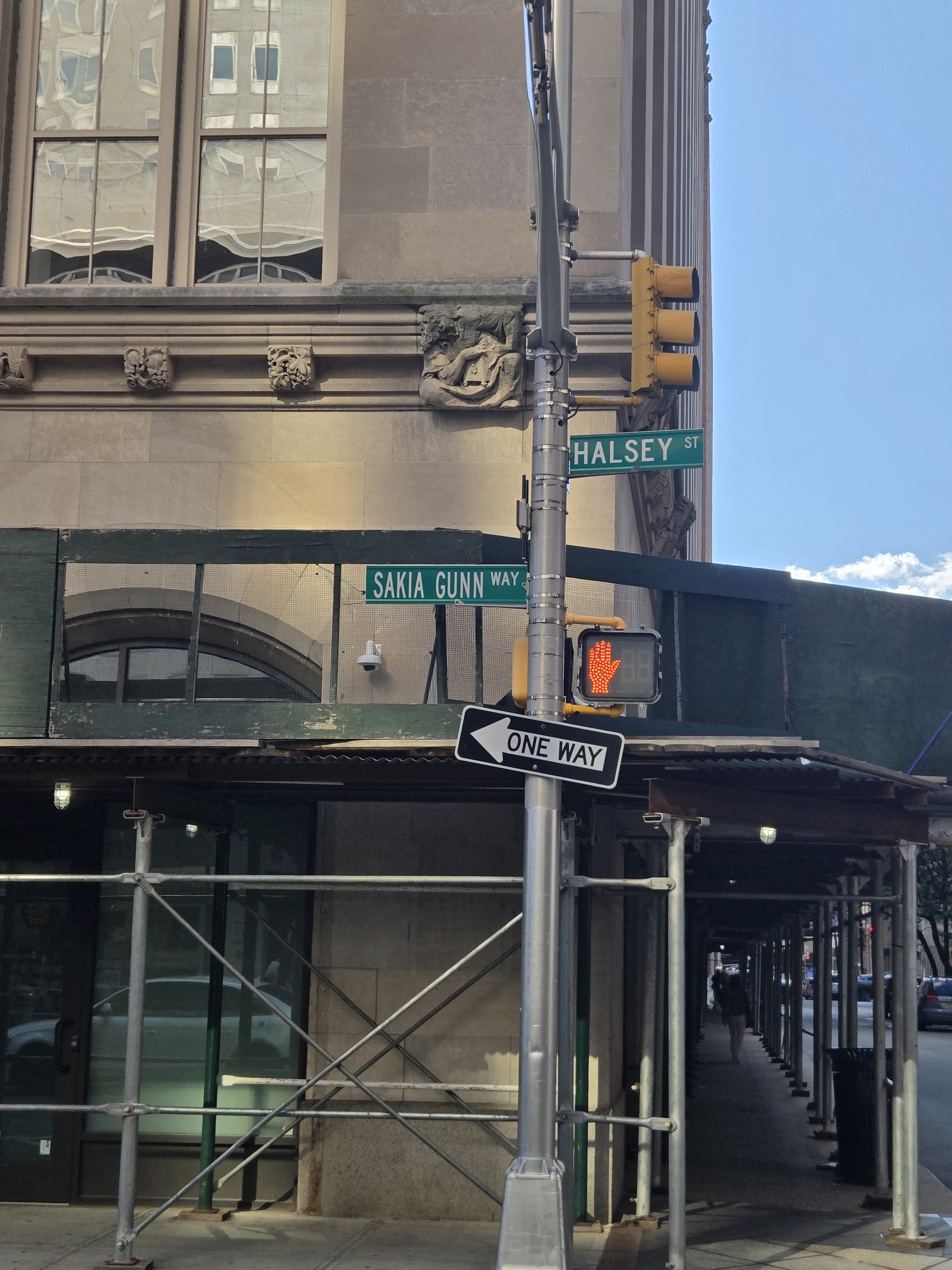
Street Sign of Sakia Gunn Way, on Halsey Street in Newark, New Jersey

On June 28, 2023, Gunn was posthumously awarded the Pride of Essex County Award. The honor was awarded by Essex County Executive Joseph DiVincenzo Jr., the Essex County Office of LGBTQ+ Affairs, and the Essex County LGBTQ Advisory Board at the Essex County Pride Month Celebration.

On October 28, 2023, a portion of Newark’s Halsey Street that intersects Academy Street was renamed Sakia Gunn Way. Gunn’s cousin, Valencia Bailey, and mother both took part in the renaming ceremony, with Bailey stating that the renaming is “showing that my cousin’s legacy will never die, it’ll forever be here. Everyone will know who she is.”

In 2024, the Newark LGBTQ Film Festival and Express Newark’s Community Media Center created the Sakia Gunn Legacy Filmmaker Fellowship, which provides grants to two LGBTQ+ filmmakers from the Greater Newark area. The fellowship aims to honor Sakia “by empowering filmmakers who are LGBTQ people of color, whose work highlights the importance of radical safety and acceptance for all.” The produced films are showcased at the Newark LGBTQ Film Festival each spring.

On June 27, 2024, the International Imperial Court System and the National LGBTQ Task Force added Sakia Gunn to the National LGBTQ Wall of Honor at the historic Stonewall Inn in New York City. Gunn was posthumously added in addition to four other individuals for their “tremendous impact on the LGBTQ movement.”
