= Catedral Evangelica Reformada =

Historic church in New Jersey, United States

- U.S. National Register of Historic Places
- U.S. Historic district – Contributing property
- New Jersey Register of Historic Places
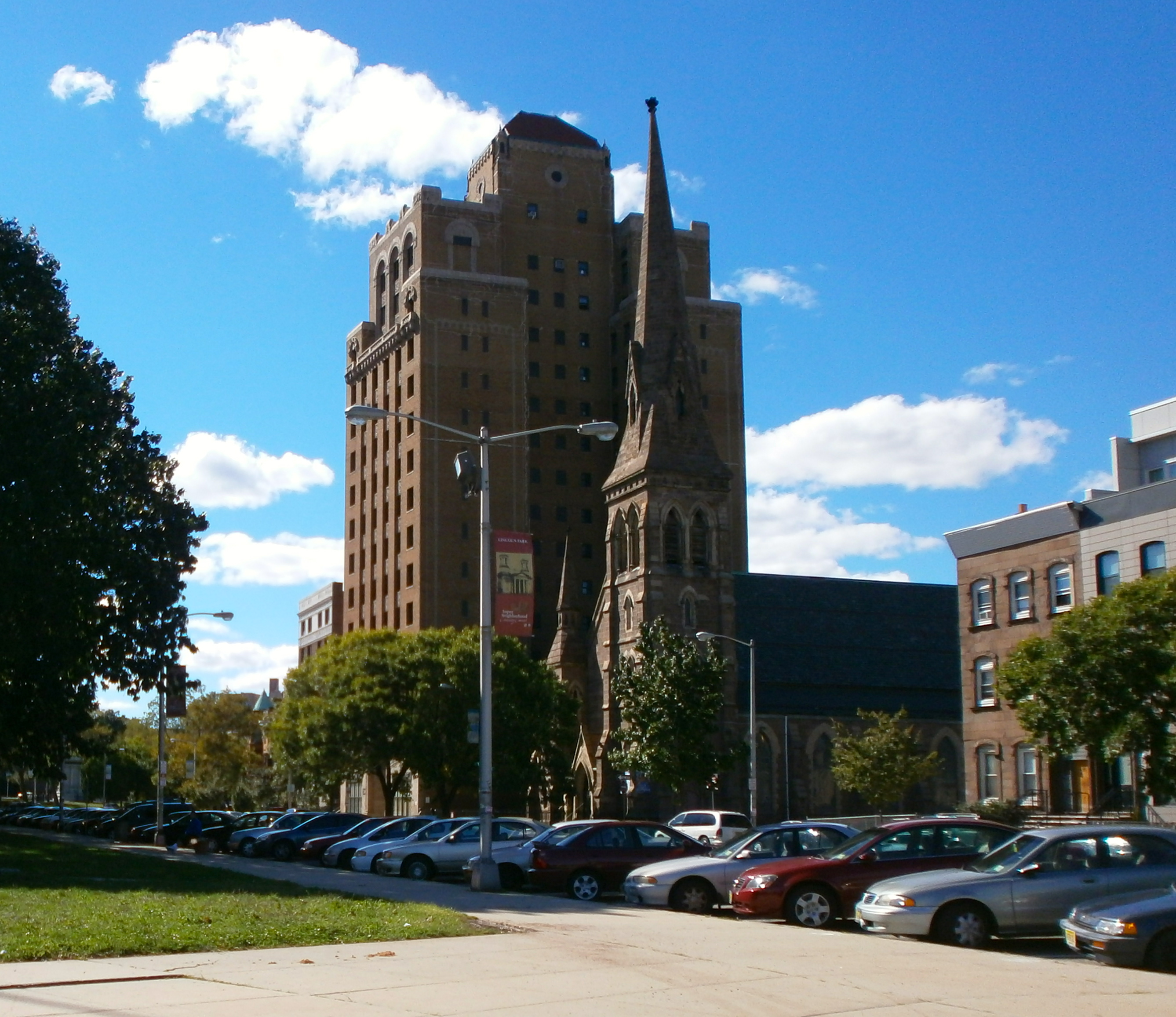

- Location within Essex County, New Jersey Location within New Jersey Location within the United States
- Location: 27 Lincoln Park and Halsey Street; Newark, New Jersey
- Coordinates: 40°43′38″N 74°10′43″W
- Area: 1 acre (0.40 ha)
- Built: 1868–1872
- Architect: Thomas A. Roberts
- Architectural style: Gothic Revival
- Part of: Lincoln Park Historic District (ID84002646)
- NRHP reference No.: 72000773
- NJRHP No.: 1220

Significant dates
- Added to NRHP: October 26, 1972
- Designated CP: January 5, 1984
- Designated NJRHP: March 17, 1972

Catedral Evangelica Reformada, originally the Clinton Avenue Reformed Church, is a historic church located at 27 Lincoln Park and Halsey Street in the Lincoln Park neighborhood of Newark in Essex County, New Jersey. It was added to the National Register of Historic Places on October 26, 1972, for its significance in architecture and religion. It was added as a contributing property to the Lincoln Park Historic District on January 5, 1984.

== History and description ==
The church was designed by architect Thomas A. Roberts in Gothic Revival style. It was constructed from 1868 to 1872. Built using light-colored sandstone, it features a tall square turret with a broach spire.

== See also ==
- National Register of Historic Places listings in Essex County, New Jersey
