= Lu Elliott =

Jazz and blues singer

Background information
- Also known as: Lucy Elliott
- Born: August 3, 1924
- Died: March 5, 1987 (aged 62)
- Years active: 1940s–1980s

Lu Elliott (August 3, 1924 – March 5, 1987) was an American jazz and blues singer and recording artist. She also recorded some soul songs. Some of the artists she worked with were B. B. King, The Duke Ellington Orchestra and the Sam Williams Express.

== Background ==
Elliott was born on August 3, 1924. She was a tuba player in her high school band. As a teenager she won first prize at the amateur night held at Harlem's Apollo Theater.

She was married to guitarist Horace C. Sims, who had played in a band called Afro Cubanaires. In 1952, she and her husband bought a 14-room house in East Orange, New Jersey.

During her career she had appeared on the Steve Allen Show and had spent a year working with BB King in the United States as well as touring Europe.

Her sister Billie Lee was also a singer.

== Career ==
=== 1940s to 1950s ===
In September 1949 and new on the scene, she provided the vocals on "He's The Greatest Thing There Is" with the Duke Ellington Orchestra that was recorded in New York. She appeared on another recording by the orchestra in late January 1950. Both she and Al Hibbler provided the vocals on "How High the Moon". She left the band in February 1950. For a period of time she was a singer in the Erskine Hawkins Orchestra. It was revealed in the March 4, 1954 edition of Jet Magazine that she was the only woman tuba player in the musicians union.

=== 1960s ===
In 1960, her single "One" / "Big Joe" was released on ABC Paramount. Billboard referred to it as an "Emotion packed" ballad.

In January 1967, it was reported that she was returning to recording, with a three-year contract that had just been signed with ABC-Paramount. In February, she began a nationwide tour with BB King. In April 1967, Billboard reported that she had gone to Australia for six weeks of dates in hotels and theaters. Later that year, she appeared at the Chevron-Hilton in Sydney, Australia. She stayed there for an extra month. Her 1967 album Way Out From Down Under received a favorable review from Billboard. The album was arranged and conducted by Johnny Pate. It is quite possible that her time in Australia was an influence on the title of the album, which featured her with a kangaroo on the front cover.

In June 1968, she appeared on the Joey Bishop Show. Along with Elliott, Johnny Mann and his Orchestra and The Collage appeared. Also in 1968, her With a Little Help from My Friends album was released on ABC Records. The album included the Lennon & McCartney composition "With a Little Help from My Friends", the Willie Cooper & Marshall Boxley composition "Our Love Will Last Forever" and the Frank Loesser composition "If I Were A Bell. It received a positive review in Billboard, with, on "If I Were a Bell", her voice being powerful, yet comfortable and her great choice of material commented on.

=== 1970s ===
December 1970 saw her with The Chicki Horn appearing at Jimmy and Wes Pemberton's 21 Club in The Virgin Islands.

In March 1973, she and Al Hibbler sang at the funeral of Key Club owner Walter C. Dawkins, who was believed to have committed suicide in his club by shooting himself.

In 1975, following the completion of a two week at the Holiday House in Pittsburgh she was hospitalized as a result of severe anemia. She spent a month in Columbus Hospital, Newark. A benefit event was held for her at the Key Club, where she was one of the favorites. Even though she was out of hospital, she was unable to attend the event as she was still recovering and had been advised by her doctor to refrain from show business for a while. Some of the people who turned up for the event were singers Lenny Welch and Gilbert Nelsonn. The Sam Williams Express was there too. Others that attended were her singer sister Billie Lee, her husband Horace Sims, fashion designer Freddie Roach and photographer Irving Overby. By the later part of the mid-1970s she was appearing at the Club Daiquiri in St. Thomas with the Sam Williams Express, a group she had teamed up with some years before. Returning to the band after her illness, they changed the name of the band to the Sam Williams-Lu Elliott Experience. In addition to updated jazz tunes, they were covering rock and soul material that included covers of songs by Al Green and Barry White. By popular demand they were to appear again in February 1976.

Around 1979, she appeared on the Redd Foxx and George Kirby shows in Las Vegas

=== 1980s ===
In the first quarter of 1981, Elliott had appeared at the Bally Casino a few times for a period of nearly three months. In mid-March 1981, she appeared at The Cookery at East Eighth Street at University Place in New York, backed by a duo consisting of Robert Banks on piano and Jimmy Lewis on bass. She was covering material by Duke Ellington and Billie Holiday with songs such as "Mood Indigo", "Sophisticated Lady" and "It Don't Mean a Thing". Elliott was brought into the Cookery after resident artist, 86 year old Alberta Hunter fell and broke her hip. She was sought out by the club's owner Barney Josephson, who tried to fill Hunter's absence with some other singers which did not work out. Then he remembered that he had previously heard her singing at St. Peters Lutheran Church in Lexington Avenue. So he contacted her. In May of that year she was singing there from Tuesday to Saturday, backed by Gerald Cook on Piano and with Jimmy Lewis on bass. On Saturday, December 12, it was announced Miss Lu Elliott and her Jazz Trio were to play a free show at the Citicorp market in New York. In January 1982, she opened for several weeks at the Golden Nugget Casino.

== Death ==
She died of cancer, either on March 4 or 5th, 1987.

== Discography (solo) ==
Singles
Title	Release info	Year	Notes
"Common Sense" / "If You Still Love Me"	MARS MRX 6001		
"Big Joe" / "One"	ABC-Paramount 45-10151	1960	
"What's Wrong" / "If I Were A Bell"	Lu El – 402, 403		with John Malachi Trio
"I Love The Ground You Walk On" / "Have You Tried To Forget?"	ABC 45-10897	1967	

Albums
Title	Release info	Year	Notes
Sings Way Out from Down Under	ABC Records ABCS-584	1967	
With a Little Help from My Friends	ABC Records – ABC 637	1968	

VA compilation albums
Album title	Release info	Year	Song	Notes
On Campus Fall 1967 Selections from New Album Releases	ABC Records Fall 67	1967	"I've Got You Under My Skin"	ABC Promo LP album

== Discography (with other artists) ==
As Lu Elliott
Artist	Release title	Release info	Year	Song title	Format	Notes
Duke Ellington and His Orchestra	"The World Is Waiting For The Sunrise" / "Joog Joog"	Columbia 30195	1949	"Joog Joog"	78 RPM single	vocals Lu Elliott, Kay Davis
Duke Ellington Orchestra	Live At Click Restaurant Philadelphia 1949	Raretone 5005-FC	1979	unknown	LP album	vocals Kay Davis, Lu Elliott, Al Hibbler
Duke Ellington And His Orchestra	The Chronogical Duke Ellington And His Orchestra 1949-1950	Classics Records 1191	2001	"The Greatest There Is"	CD comp album	
Duke Ellington And His Orchestra	The Chronogical Duke Ellington And His Orchestra 1949-1950	Classics Records 1191	2001	"Joog, Joog"	CD comp album	
Duke Ellington And His Orchestra	The Chronogical Duke Ellington And His Orchestra 1949-1950	Classics Records 1191	2001	"Good Woman Blues"	CD comp album	

As Lucy Elliott
Artist	Release title	Release info	Year	Song title	Format	Notes
Benny Carter And His Orchestra	Benny Carter And His Orchestra (No. 2)	Parlophone GEP 8568	1957	"Your Conscience Tells You So"	LP album	
Benny Carter And His Orchestra	Somebody Loves Me	Magic Records AWE 28	1987	"Patience And Fortitude"	LP comp album	vocal with Benny Carter

=== Various artist compilations ===
As Lou Elliott
Album title	Artist	Release info	Year	Format	Song	Notes
Rare Blues Girls on King Volume #3	Erskine Hawkins Orch	King CD 4503		CD compilation	"Lost Time"	as Lou Elliott
Rare Blues Girls on King Volume #3	Erskine Hawkins Orch	King CD 4503		CD compilation	"Fair Weather Friend"	as Lou Elliott
