= Newark Female Charitable Society =

- U.S. National Register of Historic Places
- New Jersey Register of Historic Places
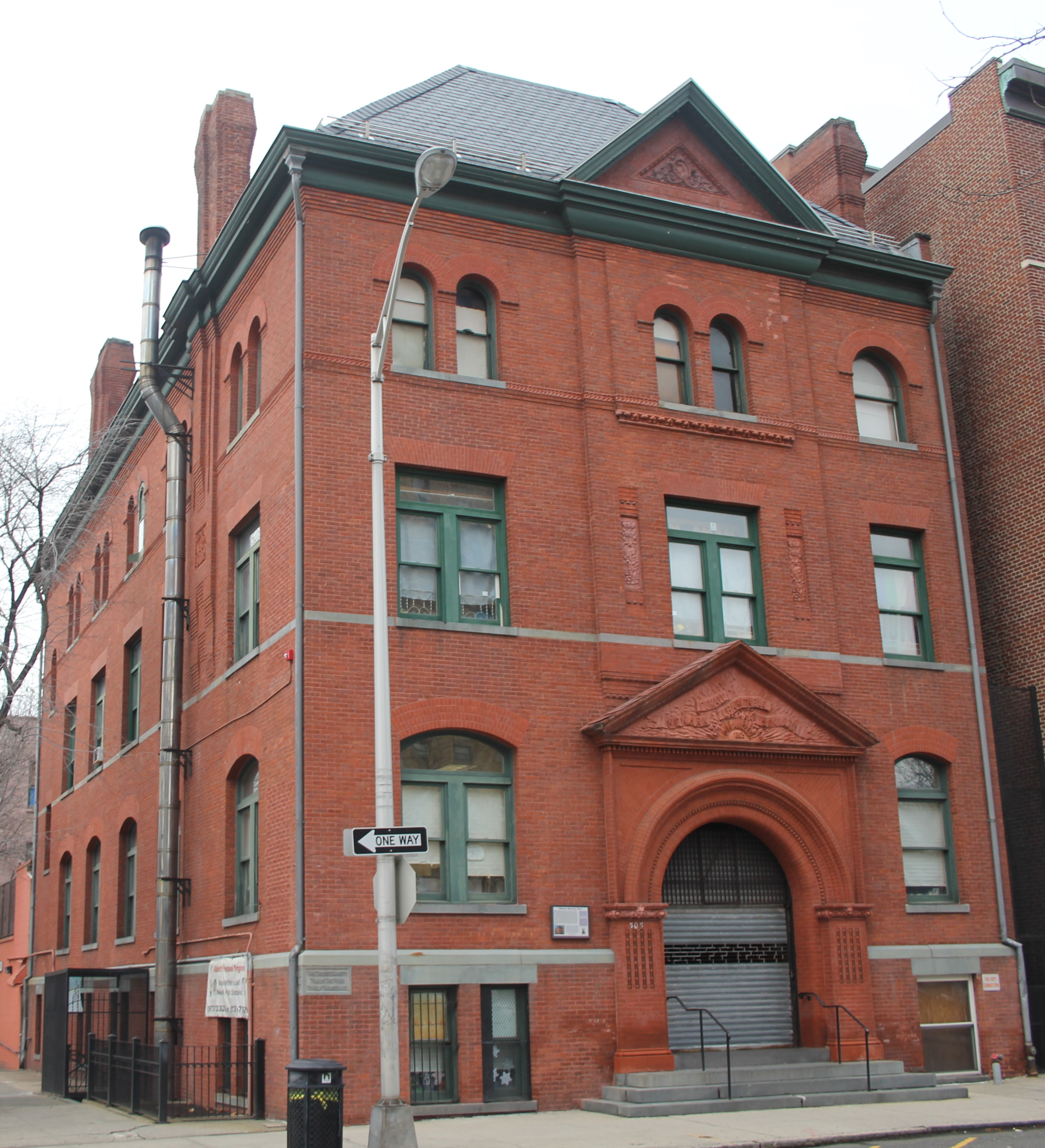
- Newark Female Charitable Society building at 305 Halsey Street

- Location within Essex County, New Jersey Location within New Jersey Location within the United States
- Location: 305 Halsey Street, 41-43 Hill Street, Newark, New Jersey
- Coordinates: 40°43′56″N 74°10′36″W
- Area: 1 acre (0.40 ha)
- Built: 1886
- Architects: Rowden, R.H.
- Architectural style: Romanesque, Victorian Eclectic
- NRHP reference No.: 79001485
- NJRHP No.: 1294

Significant dates
- Added to NRHP: September 12, 1979
- Designated NJRHP: July 5, 1979

Newark Female Charitable Society (Newark Day Center) was founded by the leading women of Newark in 1803, making it the oldest social organization in New Jersey and the third oldest in the United States. Its complex of buildings was added to the National Register of Historic Places in 1979.

== History ==
The Newark Female Charitable Society was organized in January 1803 and incorporated in 1878). It was located in the Female Charitable Building at 305 Halsey Street. The organization's goal was to relieve want without inducing pauperism. Cases were first investigated by the Bureau of Associated Charities. The Relief Committee visited the poor in their homes and gave gratuitous or industrial aid as the case demanded. The Society maintained a laundry, open daily, and provided instruction and facilities for laundry work. Dinner for women employed in the building was available daily. Industrial Building Savings Bank deposits were received Friday afternoon. Mothers' Meetings, Sewing School, and a Kitchen Garden Class were held weekly, from November to May. Fresh Air Fund work occurred from June until September.

The Newark Bureau of Associated Charities was organized in February 1882, through the initiative of members of the Newark Female Charitable Society. That Society finding itself imposed upon, sought relief in the formation of an organization that would investigate all applications for help and refer to it those for which it was properly responsible.

== Architecture and fittings ==
The Society owned a group of historic buildings at 305 Halsey Street and at 41 and 43 Hill Street in Newark, Essex County, New Jersey, United States. The oldest and most significant building is 305 Halsey Street, a 3-story red brick and terra cotta building that was built in 1886 by the Society and designed by R. H. Rowden. It is "Victorian Eclectic in style with definite Romanesque features." The building at 41 Hill Street, adjacent to 305 Halsey, is a brick townhouse acquired by the Society in 1912 to house its expanding programs, although its maintenance proved expensive and it was sold by the Society in 1923. The two-story building next door at 43 Hill Street was constructed in 1977 as a medical and dental clinic. The entire complex was added to the National Register of Historic Places in 1979.

== Newark Day Center ==
The Society is now known as the Newark Day Center and functions as a community organization. It still occupies 305 Halsey and 43 Hill, which together house a child development center, a senior center, and other programs that benefit Newark residents.

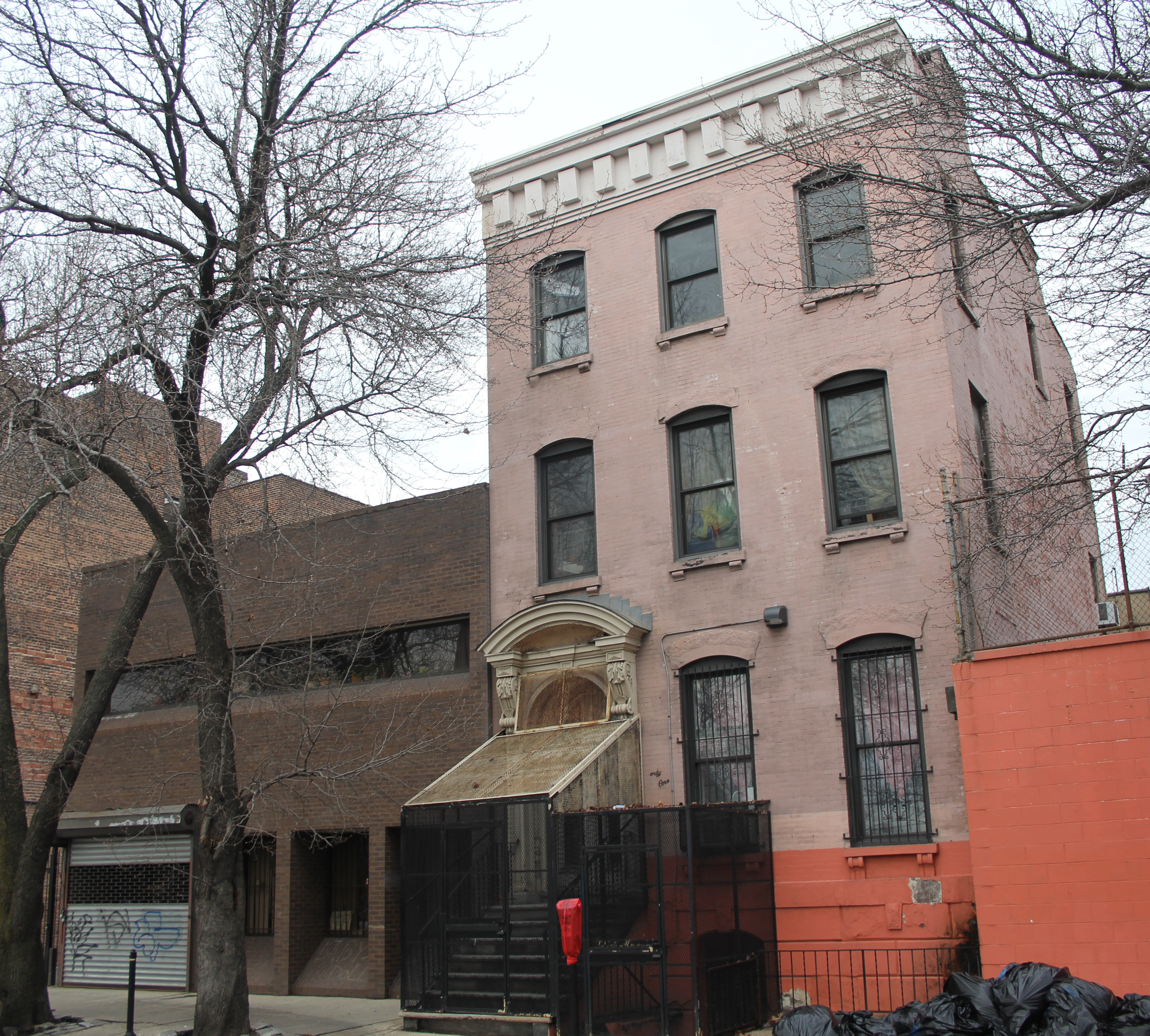
Smaller buildings at 41 (right) and 43 Hill Street

== Notable people ==
- Ida Wharton Dawson (1860-1928), President, New Jersey State Federation of Women's Clubs

== Selected works ==
- Newark Female Charitable Society (N.J.) (1903). Constitution and By-laws of the Newark, Female Charitable Society.
- Newark Female Charitable Society (N.J.) (1903). The History of the Newark Female Charitable Society: From the Date of Organization, January 31st, 1803, to January 31st, 1903 : a Century of Benevolence 1803-1903. The Society.
- Newark Female Charitable Society (N.J.) (1953). Newark Female Charitable Society: History, 1903-1953. The Society.

== See also ==
- National Register of Historic Places listings in Essex County, New Jersey
