= CWOW Gallery =

Alternative art gallery in Newark, New Jersey, US

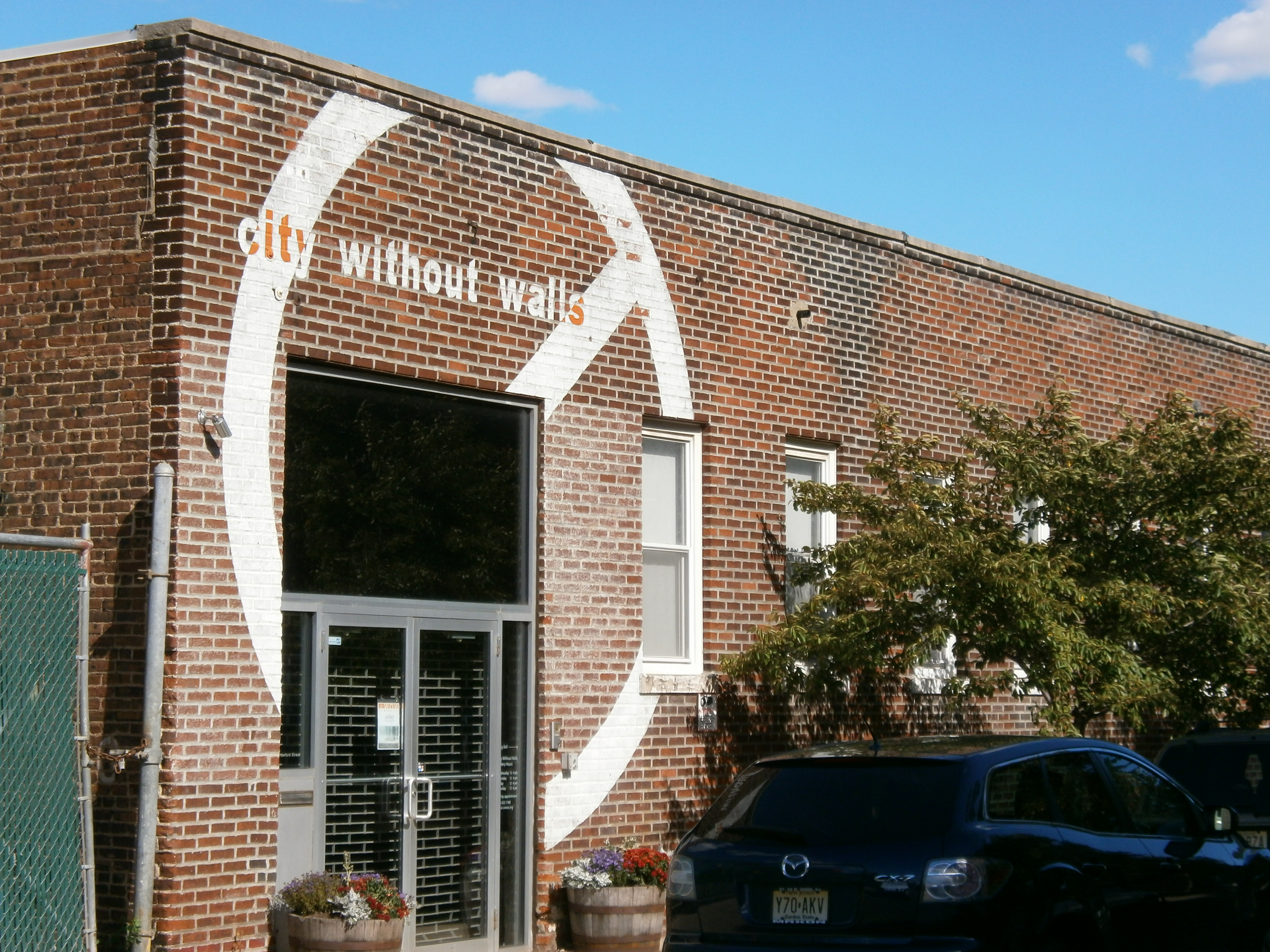
- Established: c. 1975
- Dissolved: 2018
- Location: 6 Crawford Street; Newark 07102
- Coordinates: 40.7370°N 74.1757°W
- Type: Contemporary art
- Website: http://cwow.org

cWOW Gallery, also known as City Without Walls Gallery, is a defunct alternative art gallery located in Newark, New Jersey, occupying a building on Halsey Street at Crawford Street in the Lincoln Park/The Coast Cultural District.

City Without Walls was New Jersey's oldest not-for-profit alternative art space, in continuous operation since 1975 with a "two-fold mission offers career development opportunities to new and emerging artists, while providing the public a chance to understand and enjoy challenging contemporary art." The alternative art space relied on members to curate their on-site and off-site gallery spaces, cWOW, which stands for City Without Walls, had an estimated 6-10 exhibitions per year. It also ran three educational programs called City Murals, Newark New Media, and ArtReach.

cWOW operated a gallery in the atrium of One Newark Center. Both spaces were on the citywide Open Doors Studio Tour.

The CWOW gallery closed in 2018 after 43 years.

== See also ==
- City Without Walls
- Aljira, a Center for Contemporary Art
- Newark Museum
