= Lincoln Park, Newark =

Neighborhood in Newark, New Jersey

- Lincoln Park Historic District
- U.S. National Register of Historic Places
- U.S. Historic district
- New Jersey Register of Historic Places
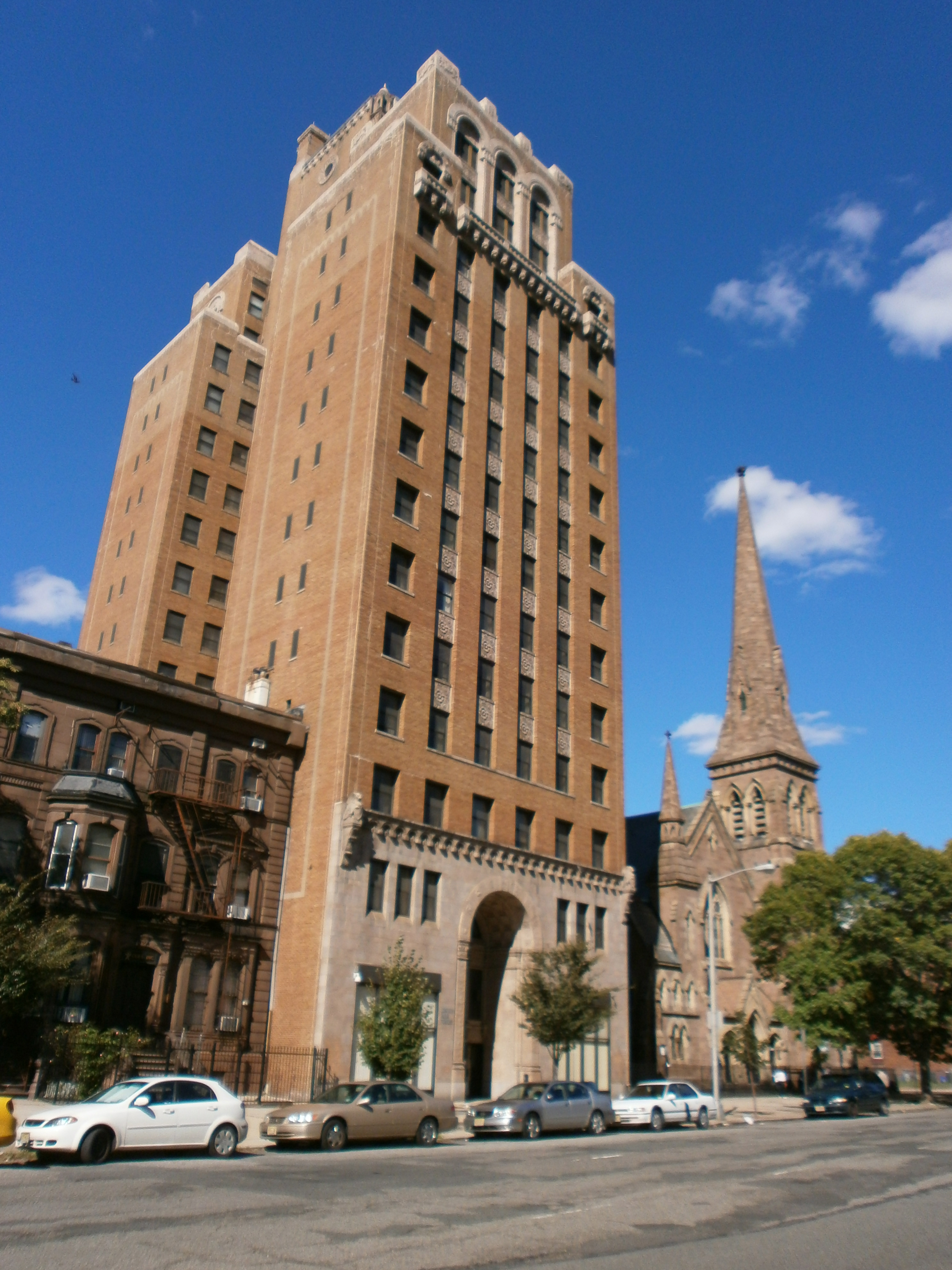
- The Lincoln Park Towers across the street from the park itself.

- Location within Essex County, New Jersey Location within New Jersey Location within the United States
- Location: Lincoln Park, Broad, Washington and Spruce Streets, Clinton and Pennsylvania Avenues; Newark, New Jersey
- Coordinates: 40°43′35″N 74°10′45″W
- Area: 23 acres (9.3 ha)
- Architectural style: Italianate, Romanesque, Queen Anne
- NRHP reference No.: 84002646
- NJRHP No.: 1280

Significant dates
- Added to NRHP: January 5, 1984
- Designated NJRHP: November 22, 1983

Lincoln Park is a city square and neighborhood, also known as "the Coast," in Newark, Essex County, New Jersey, United States. It is bounded by the Springfield/Belmont, South Broad Valley, South Ironbound and Downtown neighborhoods. It is bounded by Martin Luther King Jr. Blvd. (High Street) to the west, West Kinney St. to the north, the McCarter Highway to the east and South St., Pennsylvania Avenue, Lincoln Park and Clinton Avenue to the south. Part of the neighborhood is a historic district listed on the New Jersey Register of Historic Places and the National Register of Historic Places. Lincoln Park as a street turns into Clinton Avenue toward the south and north edge of the park.

== History and description ==
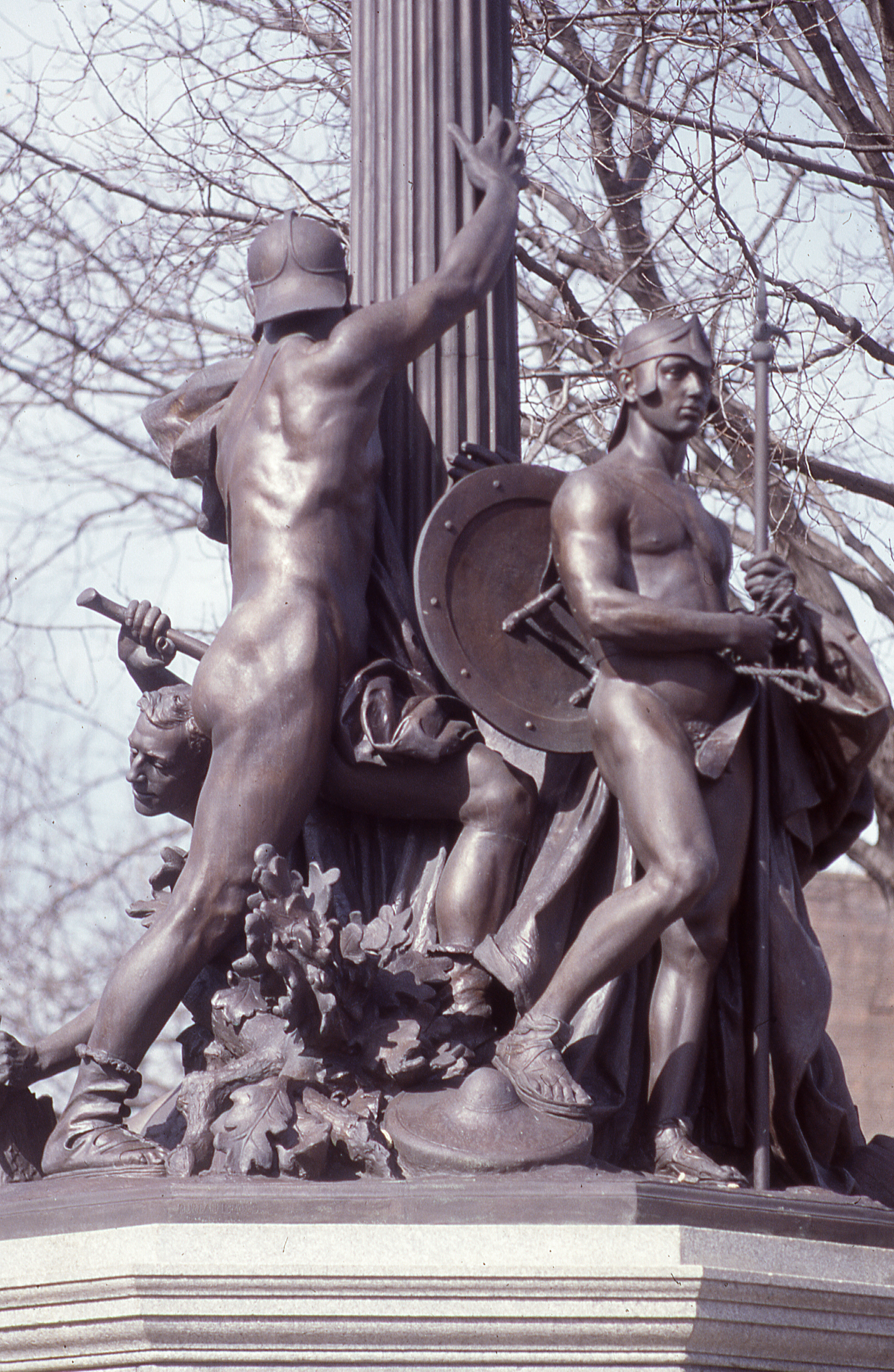
Planting the Standard of Democracy

Lincoln Park itself was one of three original colonial era commons and for a long time the heart of a fashionable residential district, the others being Washington Park and Military Park. The area is now home to the City Without Walls gallery (cWOW), Newark Symphony Hall and the Newark School of the Arts.

The main body of Lincoln Park is bounded by Broad Street and contains several statues including Frederick Theodore Frelinghuysen, Planting the Standard of Democracy by Charles Henry Niehaus, and Captive's Choice, an historic statue erected in 1884 by Chauncey Ives, an American sculptor living in Rome, Italy. It depicts a young English woman who did not wish to return to her family after being held captive by American Indians during the French and Indian War.

Lincoln Park also has a varied array of large, old-growth trees.

The Lincoln Park neighborhood has two community gardens. LPCCD is also planning a large community garden as part of its Façade project behind the old South Park Calvary United Presbyterian Church, an historically preserved facade.

=== The Coast ===
In the early 20th century, the Lincoln Park area was a neighborhood of nightclubs known as "The Coast." It was a center of jazz and a red-light district or "tenderloin" formerly called the Barbary Coast, after San Francisco's neighborhood.

== Historic district ==
The Lincoln Park Historic District is a 23-acre (9.3 ha) historic district located in the neighborhood. The district was added to the National Register of Historic Places on January 5, 1984, for its significance in architecture, art, and landscape architecture. It includes 41 contributing buildings, one contributing site, and three contributing objects. The Catedral Evangelica Reformada, listed individually on the NRHP in 1972, contributes to the district.

== The Lincoln Park Music Festival ==
The LPCCD sponsors the annual Lincoln Park Music Festival in July, which since beginning in 2006 has grown to be an event attracting 50,000 spectators. The LPCCD would like to develop the Museum of American Music (MoAAM) in recognition of the district's past as a breeding ground for music.

== Revitalization and arts district ==
The district is slowly being revitalized by The Lincoln Park/Coast Cultural District (LPCCD), which states its mission to "develop a sustainable arts community built on affordable housing, green jobs, music, culture and urban farming.” Newark in the past has been a large producer of music and continues to produce well-known contemporary artists. The Coast is being redeveloped to pay homage and recreate on a small scale an area with deep roots in American music. An "Arts Park" is also in the planning stages in addition to new housing, stores, a restaurant, nightclub, music studio and dance studio.

Lincoln Park has been designated an "Arts District" of Newark. While not a comparable artist colony in relation to cities of similar or larger size, Lincoln Park is home to the City Without Walls art gallery; the Newark School of the Arts, a heavily endowed performance and fine arts institution; and Newark Symphony Hall (1020 Broad Street), a venue for music and performing arts events and concerts. Several independent artists focusing on many types of media live in new or rehabilitated housing investments that have been built since 2008 and continue to target spaces to artists. Because there is no organized membership or organization for artists, it is unknown how many artists live in the area. Several million dollars of capital investment has been made over the past ten years in Lincoln Park, including some of the first LEED and eco-friendly certified buildings in the city.

Lincoln Park is surrounded on three sides by more than a few small to large in-patient substance abuse rehabilitation facilities for adults and teenagers, mostly suburbanites who are court-sentenced into treatment and rehabilitation. The two main substance abuse treatment centers are CURA, Inc. and Integrity House, both of which operate several men's and women's dormitories as well as out-patient services along the park. Most of these facilities use re-purposed blighted brownstone buildings, former hotels, etc. that were abandoned and in disrepair until they were purchased and rehabilitated into substance abuse treatment facilities. In March 2014, Integrity House opened another 38-bed men's dormitory for in-patient treatment at 49-51 Lincoln Park. This left only a handful of abandoned or blighted structures surrounding Lincoln Park. The Lincoln Park community falls within the East district (or "3rd precinct").

Lincoln Park benefits from its proximity to mixed-use and non-mixed-use properties that include institutional, residential, horticultural, commercial, and educational facilities. Other notable buildings situated along Lincoln Park include:

- Colleoni Apartments, also known as Lincoln Park Lofts, (39-41 Lincoln Park) a once blighted seven-story hotel, and later a tenement transformed into moderate-income housing that opened in 2008 after a multimillion-dollar top-to-bottom rehabilitation by Regan Development Corporation of Ardsley, New York, and now managed by The Michaels Organization of Marlton, New Jersey;
- Lincoln Park Towers (31-33 Lincoln Park), an 18-story low- and moderate-income senior living community in an historic highrise that was once The Medical Arts Building, a medical and surgical facility;
- Newark School of the Arts (89-91 Lincoln Park);
- the Adelaide Sanford Charter School (51-53 Lincoln Park);
- the Dryden Mansion, a center for non-profit organizations; and
- The Newark Educators' Community Charter School (17-19 Crawford Street), a charter school converted from a 150-year-old horse stable serving approximately 200 students in kindergarten through third grade. Almost all addresses surrounding Lincoln Park are dashed addresses.

Since 2013, Cory Booker has lived in a townhouse he owns on Longworth Street in the Lincoln Park area.

== See also ==
- National Register of Historic Places listings in Essex County, New Jersey
- List of public art in Newark, New Jersey
