= With a Little Help from My Friends (Lu Elliott album) =

Studio album by Lu Elliott
- Released: 1968
- Genre: Jazz, Soul
- Label: ABC; ABC 637, ABCS 637

Lu Elliott chronology
Sings Way Out from Down Under (1967)	With a Little Help from My Friends (1968)

With a Little Help from My Friends is the second ABC album for jazz singer Lu Elliott. It was released in 1968 and featured the songs "With a Little Help from My Friends", "The Very Thought of You" and "If I Were a Bell".

== Background ==
This album which was Elliott's second album for ABC was released a short time after her first which was Sings Way Out from Down Under. It was released in 1968 on ABC ABCS 637.

=== Reviews ===
In 1968, Stereo Review referred to the album as a recording of special merit. The album also received a good review from Billboard in the magazine's July 20, 1968 issue. It said that she was a gal loaded with talent which vibrated in the grooves of the disk.

== Track listing ==
A side

- "With a Little Help from My Friends" – 2:35
- "The Very Thought of You" – 2:14
- "My Romance" – 2:32
- "I'll Show Them All" – 3:00
- "Our Love Will Last Forever" – 2:18
- "On Green Dolphin Street" – 2:36

B side

- "If I Were a Bell" – 2:45
- "Don't Love Me" – 2:54
- "I Know No" – 3:06
- "Treat Me Good" – 3:04
- "Don't Go to Strangers" – 2:10
