= New Jersey State Federation of Women's Clubs =

New Jersey State Federation of Women's Club
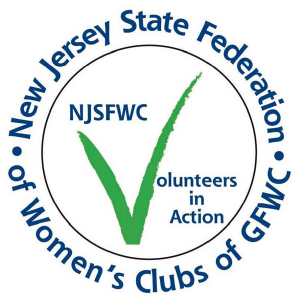
- Founded: 1894
- Founded at: New Brunswick, New Jersey USA
- Type: Community
- Headquarters: New Brunswick, New Jersey
- Website: www.njsfwc.org

New Jersey State Federation of Women's Clubs (NJSFWC) was founded in 1894 and is currently located in New Brunswick, New Jersey. NJSFWC is the largest volunteer women's service organization in the state of New Jersey and a member of the General Federation of Women's Clubs. There are approximately 8,000 members in 200 clubs located throughout New Jersey. They provide opportunities for women with education, leadership training, and community service through participation in local clubs. In 1918, the NJSFWC founded the New Jersey College for Women (now Douglass Residential College), and offers scholarships to Douglass students.

== History ==
- NJSFWC led to the formation of the Palisades Interstate Park Commission to oversee the preservation of The Palisades
- Named the Grassroots Organization of the Year by the New Jersey Highlands Coalition in 2003
- The New Jersey Library Association awarded its "Library Champions Award" to the NJSFWC in 2004
- A 2004 letter writing campaign to state and Federal legislators which secured passage of the Highlands Water Protection and Planning Act

== Notable people ==
- Mrs. L. Dow Balliett (1847-1929), Director of music, NJSFWC
- Ida Wharton Dawson (1860-1928), President, NJSFWC
