= Key Club (jazz club) =

Jazz club

The Key Club was a jazz club in Newark, New Jersey. It closed in the 1970s, along with other jazz clubs on Halsey Street, such as Sparky J's.

== Background ==
Walter Dawkins inherited the club from his uncle and he and his wife Jean / Jeanne ran it.

On Monday evening, March 19, 1973, Dawkins was believed to have committed suicide by shooting himself in the chest with a 38 colt revolver. The gun was believed to have discharged twice with one bullet in the ceiling and the other in his chest. His body was found still seated in one of the lounge chairs located near the entrance to the club which was locked. By the time of his funeral, it wasn't clear as to who found his body.

At his funeral service, both Lu Elliott and Al Hibbler sang at his funeral. Elliott's husband Horace C. Sims and singer Carol Mitchell also attended.

Following his death, the club was run by his wife Eugenia (Jeanne) Dawkins. It was one of the jazz clubs featured on the "A Tribute to Newark Jazz Clubs" painting, a large-scale outdoor mural in Newark completed in 2013.

== Musicians and bands ==
Below is a selected list of musicians and band who played at least once at Key Club:

- George Benson
- Lu Elliott
- Sarah Vaughan
- Charles Earland
- Stanley Turrentine
- Rhoda Scott
- Jimmy McGriff
- Betty Carter
- Jimmy Scott

== See also ==
- Sparky J's (historic Newark jazz club)
- Institute of Jazz Studies in Newark
- Clement's Place, jazz club in Newark, New Jersey
