= New Civilization Church =

New Thought church

- Classification: New Civilization Church
- Orientation: New Thought
- Associations: Affiliated New Thought Network, International New Thought Alliance
- Founder: Dr. Julia Seton
- Origin: 1905; Boston, Massachusetts

The New Civilization Church or Church and School of the New Civilization, also known as The New Thought Church and School, was founded in 1905 in Boston, Massachusetts, by Dr. Julia Lorinda Seton Kapp Sears, better known as Dr. Julia Seton.

== History ==
Other congregations were started in Manhattan and Brooklyn; London, England; Cleveland; Buffalo; Chicago; Denver; and in California. From 1911 through 1914, the "official organ" of the New Thought Church and School was "The Column," a magazine edited by Dr. Seton and her co-editors Dr. Roy Page Walton, Henry Fielding, and Clifford W. Cheasley. Walton was married to Dr. Seton's daughter, Dr. Juno Belle Kapp, also known as Dr. Juno Walton, who was a speaker in the denomination's churches, and who, under the pen-name Dr. Juno Jordan, wrote popular books on numerology.

== Mission ==
The central mission of the New Civilization Church was, "It is the deep of supply answering to the deep of need. It will remain because mankind can use it as sane, sensible, spiritual substance, with which he can pass his life into higher manifestation of health, wealth, love, service and worship. This church believes in all churches, all creeds and all people, without regard to class, creed or color, Anyone can come into the new church and learn its fundamentals and principles and return to his own church, his own country, his own class, his own people and better fulfill his life's destiny."

Dr. Seton was elected fourth vice-president for the League for the Larger Life.
