= James Street Commons Historic District =

Historic district in New Jersey, United States

- U.S. National Register of Historic Places
- U.S. Historic district
- New Jersey Register of Historic Places
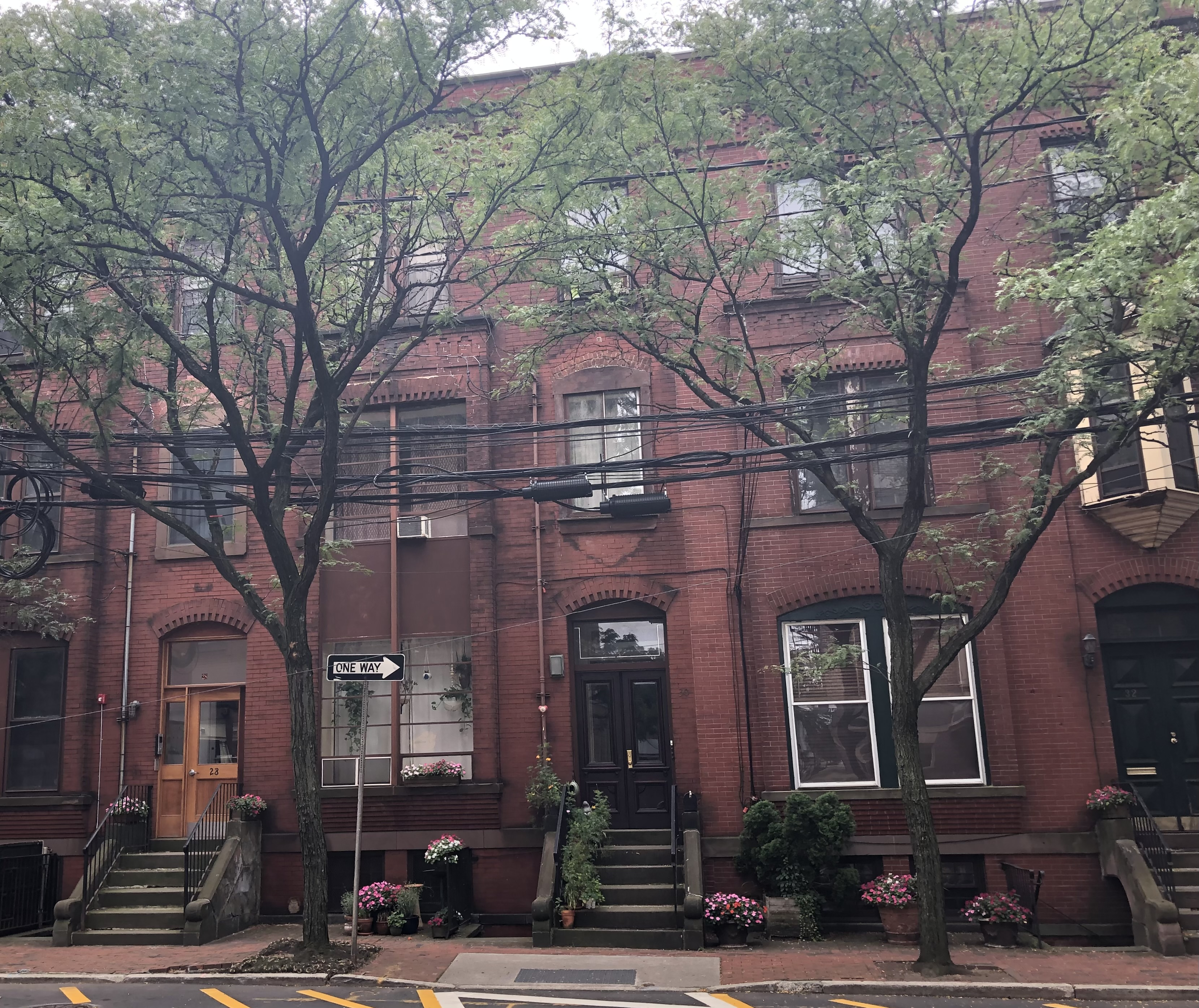
- James Street

- Location within Essex County, New Jersey Location within New Jersey Location within the United States
- Location: Roughly bounded by Halsey, Warren, Boyden, Bleeker, Orange, and Broad Streets, Newark, New Jersey
- Coordinates: 40°44′36″N 74°10′25″W
- Area: 65 acres (26 ha)
- Architects: Jeremiah O'Rourke; Rankin & Kellogg; John and Wilson Ely
- Architectural style: Late 19th And 20th Century Revivals, Late Victorian, Art Deco
- NRHP reference No.: 78001758 (original); 83001601 (increase)
- NJRHP No.: 1275

Significant dates
- Added to NRHP: January 9, 1978
- Boundary increase: September 22, 1983
- Designated NJRHP: February 10, 1977

The James Street Commons Historic District is a 65-acre (26 ha) historic district located in Newark, Essex County, New Jersey, United States. The district was added to the National Register of Historic Places on January 9, 1978, for its significance in architecture, art, community planning and development, education, industry, and social history. There was a small boundary increase on September 22, 1983.

== History and description ==
When first surveyed in 1977 for landmark status, the district had 425 structures. Since then about 170 historic buildings in the district have been demolished, or about 40% of the district's urban fabric. When buildings are demolished, the predominant land use becomes surface parking. Rutgers University, Edison ParkFast, St. Michael's Hospital, and the New Jersey Institute of Technology are the main owners of surface parking lots and structures within the district. In 2020, the actions of NJIT president Joel Bloom with demolition of the nationally landmarked Warren Street School resulted in the historic district being listed among the ten most endangered historic places in New Jersey.

== Contributing properties ==
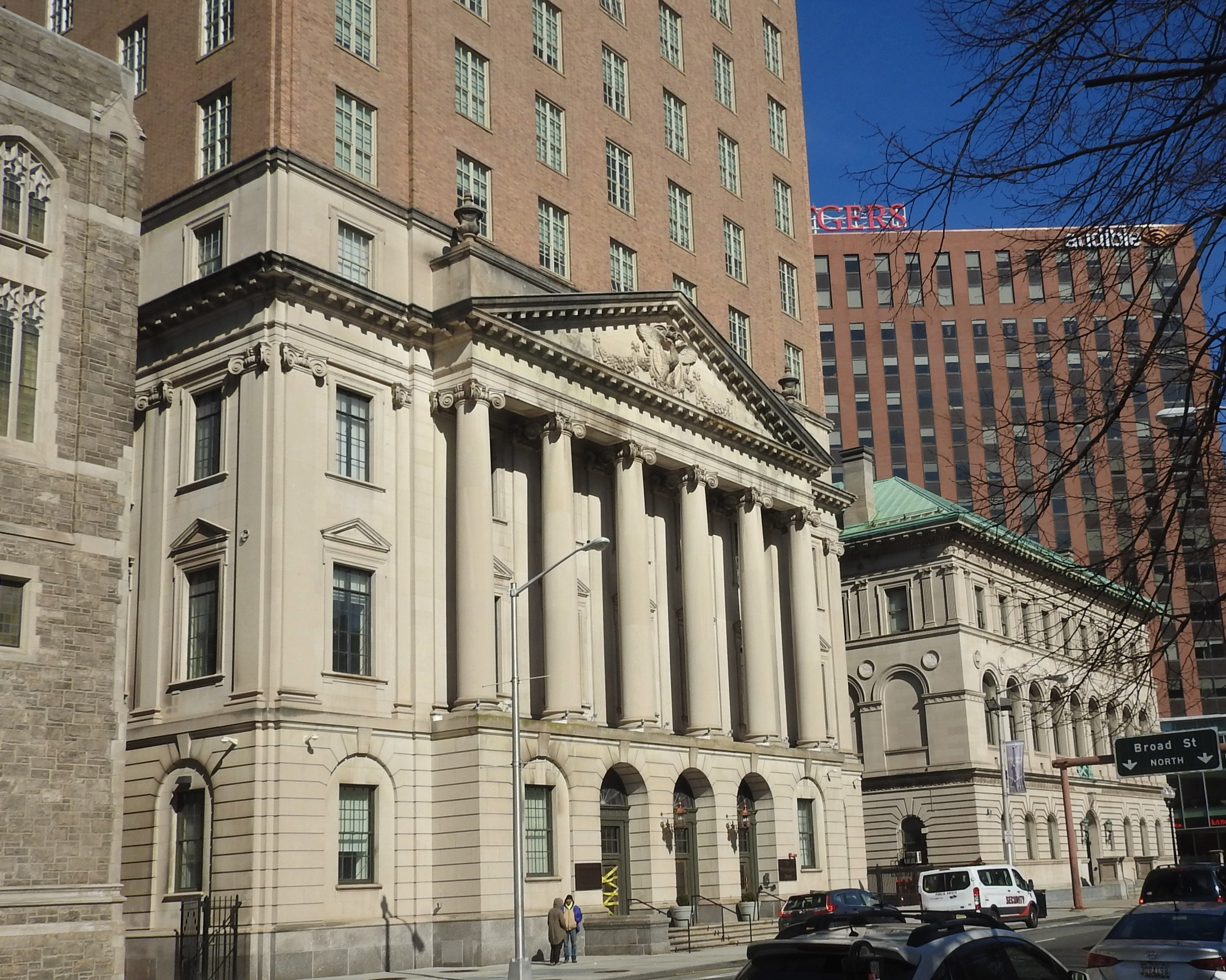
15 Washington Street, American Insurance Company Building

- Washington Park (Newark) a.k.a. Harriet Tubman Square
- American Insurance Company Building
- Newark Public Library
- Newark Museum
- St. Michael's Hospital
- Pro-Cathedral of Saint Patrick

== Notable people ==
- Guy Sterling - James Street resident, author, and reporter
- Clement Alexander Price - American historian
- Jeremiah O'Rourke - Irish-American architect at 45 Burnet Street
- Seth Boyden - demolished workshop was in the neighborhood
- George Westinghouse - demolished factory was just outside the district
- John Cotton Dana - founder of the Newark Public Library and Newark Museum
- Peter Ballantine - Scottish-American industrialist
- Elvin W. Crane - politician and relative of author Stephen Crane
- Edward Weston - chemist and engineer, competitor with Thomas Edison
- Louis Bamberger - businessman and philanthropist, property owner in the area

== See also ==
- National Register of Historic Places listings in Essex County, New Jersey
