= Jeremiah O'Rourke =

American architect (1833–1915)

- Born: February 6, 1833; Dublin, Ireland, British Empire
- Died: April 22, 1915 (aged 82); Newark. New Jersey, United States
- Education: Queen's College, Cork
- Occupation: Architect
- Spouse: Elizabeth Dunn (m. 1860)
- Buildings: Cathedral Basilica of the Sacred Heart (Newark); Old Post Office (Washington, D.C.)

Jeremiah O'Rourke, FAIA, (February 6, 1833 – April 22, 1915), was an Irish-American architect known primarily for his designs of Roman Catholic churches and institutions and Federal post offices. He was a founder of the Newark-based architectural firms of Jeremiah O'Rourke (active from the 1850s to the 1880s) and Jeremiah O'Rourke & Sons (active from the 1880s until his death).

== Early life ==
O'Rourke was born in Dublin, Ireland in 1833 as one of eight children and graduated in 1850 from the Government School of Design, Queens College, Cork. He thereafter emigrated to the United States where he found work drafting plans for a Newark carpenter-builder, Jonathan Nichols. He married Elizabeth Cecilia Dunn in 1860. He lived in a home he designed and built at 45 Burnet Street in what is now the James Street Commons Historic District.

In 1870, in anticipation of erecting a cathedral, James Roosevelt Bayley, Bishop of Newark, sent O'Rourke and Monsignor George Hobart Doane on a tour of England and France to study European churches.

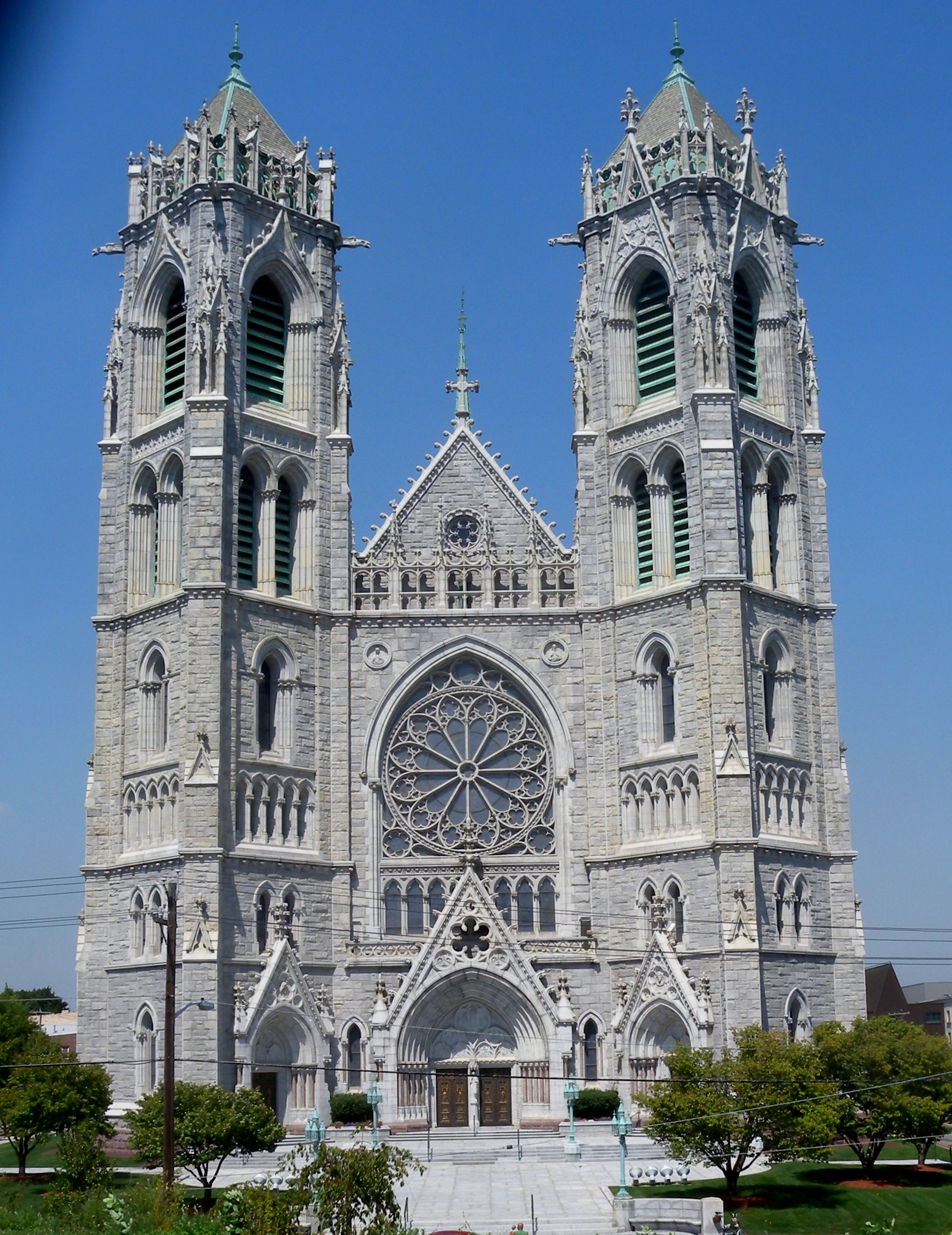
O'Rourke's Cathedral Basilica of the Sacred Heart in Newark

== Architecture ==
He set up his architectural firm in Newark, New Jersey, where he was Patrick Keely's chief "competitor for Roman Catholic church and institutional commissions in metropolitan New York and northern New Jersey."

He became a member and Fellow of the American Institute of Architects in 1886.

O'Rourke was appointed from April 1893 to September 1894 to the office of the United States Supervising Architect in Washington, D.C., during the presidency of Grover Cleveland on the recommendation of both New Jersey senators. Succeeding W. J. Edbrooke of Chicago in this job, O'Rourke's designed several federal post offices with his annual salary of $4,500 (about $130,000 in 2020 adjusted for inflation).

He returned in 1894 to private practice, founding Jeremiah O'Rourke & Sons in Newark and New York City with sons William P. O'Rourke, Joseph B. O'Rourke, and Louis J. O'Rourke. O'Rourke and his sons specialized in ecclesiastical designs.

O'Rourke died April 22, 1915, in Newark.

== Selected works ==
=== Churches ===
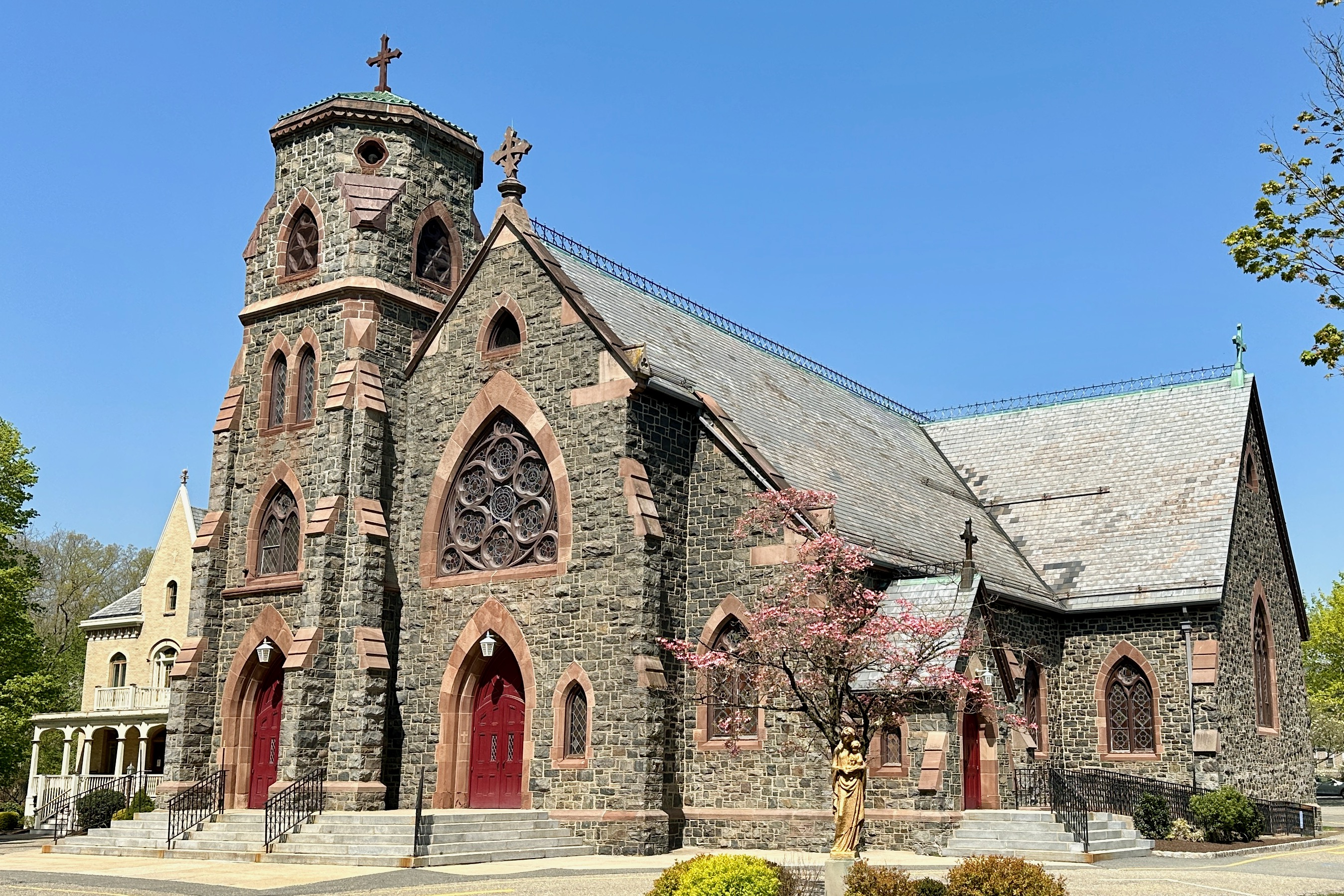
St. Mary's Church in Wharton, New Jersey

- St. John's in Orange, New Jersey: a Gothic Revival and English Gothic church, with some French Gothic Details); completed 1868 with a 200-foot (61 m) spire. When interviewed by a New York newspaper reporter shortly before he died in 1915, O'Rourke commented that St. John's was his favorite design.
- St. Joseph's, Rectory, and School in Newark: Cornerstone laid in 1872; later closed and converted into clinic offices and the home of the Priory Restaurant
- St. Mary's Roman Catholic Church in Wharton, New Jersey, built from 1872 to 1873
- St. Mary's in Plainfield, New Jersey: cornerstone laid November 18, 1875, and dedicated September 8, 1880; red brick structure with ornamental details in white brick, black brick, and gargoyles on tower
- Church of St. Paul the Apostle in Manhattan built from 1876 to 1884
- St. Michael's Church in Newark: cornerstone laid April 24, 1878
- St. Aloysius Church in Newark: cornerstone laid June 20, 1880. Brownstone measures 132 by 60 feet at the base, internal ceiling with oak panel finish. Construction cost about $45,000.
- Holy Cross Church in Harrison, New Jersey: cornerstone laid in 1886. A cathedral-like structure clad in brownstone with a largely intact interior. Planned spires were never built; the side porches are later additions.
- St Marys Roman Catholic Church Rahway NJ (now Divine Mercy). Completed 1888, the red Gothic architecture features a long nave lined with clerestory stained-glass windows on each side depicting significant events from the bible, the round windows are reminiscent of Romanesque influence on an otherwise Gothic structure.
- St. Anthony's near downtown Jersey City, New Jersey: built 1892
- Sacred Heart in Bloomfield, New Jersey: dedicated October 16, 1892
- Cathedral Basilica of the Sacred Heart in Newark: cornerstone laid 1899 and dedicated 1954. O'Rourke acted as the primary architect from 1899 to 1910. This was largest project of his career and is now the fifth-largest cathedral in North America, the largest in New Jersey, and the home of the Roman Catholic Archdiocese of Newark. In keeping with O'Rourke's Catholic and Irish heritage, the original design called for an English-Irish Gothic Revival church, but plans were later modified in favor of a French Gothic Revival style. Among other firsts, this is the only cathedral in North America with twin towers on the front facade that are rotated 45 degrees against building's main orientation.
- St. Patrick's Pro-Cathedral Rectory adjacent to the Pro-Cathedral on Washington Street and Central Avenue in the Tudor Gothic style with renovated interior. St. Patrick's was the home of Newark's archdiocese before work began on Sacred Heart.
- Church of the Immaculate Conception in Camden, New Jersey: completed 1953. The building is now the cathedral of the Diocese of Camden.

=== Post Offices ===
- Old United States Courthouse and Post Office in Duluth, Minnesota: built 1894 with six stories
- Old Post Office Pavilion in Washington, D.C.'s Federal Triangle: built 1899 with 12 stories
- Old Post Office in Buffalo, New York: built 1901 with five stories
- Tomochichi Federal Building and U.S. Courthouse, Savannah, Georgia

=== Institutional ===
- Saint Michael's Hospital in Newark: built c. 1868 with a Gothic Revival chapel. In expectation of municipal funding, the Newark Archdiocese intended O'Rourke's project to be Newark's public hospital. Staffed for over one hundred years by Franciscan nuns, it was funded through donations from the city's Catholic community. The laying of its cornerstone was allegedly a uniquely early moment of racial unity when blacks and whites marched together in procession.
- The Immaculate Conception Chapel at Seton Hall University was completely restored internally and externally. The interior is intricately detailed with an exposed hammer-beam roof and colorfully painted motifs
- Warren Street School in Newark, built 1891, expanded 1908. A three-story brick school with limestone trim, slate roof, and cast terracotta details. Joel Bloom, president of the New Jersey Institute of Technology, demolished this landmark for the campus expansion.
- Columbus Hall in Orange, NJ: Built 1893 in a generally neo-Renaissance style; constructed of buff-colored brick with stone belt courses and ornamental terracotta trim. Built as the home of St. John's School, it included a fully equipped theater.
- Hotel Lorraine at 545 5th Avenue in Manhattan: completed by 1930 with 13 stories

Preceded by Willoughby J. Edbrooke	Office of the Supervising Architect; April 1893 – September 1894	Succeeded by William Martin Aiken
