= Joel Bloom =

American lawyer & educator (born 1947)

10th President of NJIT
- In office January 2012 – June 2022
- Preceded by: Robert Altenkirch

Personal details
- Born: May 10, 1947 (age 79)
- Education: Hunter College (BA & MA); Teachers College, Columbia University (MA and EdD)
- Profession: Administrator

Joel Bloom was the eighth President of New Jersey Institute of Technology (NJIT). He became President in 2012 and retired in 2022. He was never a faculty member at any university during his professional life including NJIT.

== Life and career ==
Bloom did his undergraduate studies at Hunter College in New York City, where he also earned a master's degree. He then went on to earn both a master's degree and a doctorate from Teachers College, Columbia University. Bloom held various positions in the New York Public school system. Between 1984 and 1990 he was an assistant commissioner in the New Jersey Department of Education. After joining NJIT in 1990, he was appointed president in 2012 after serving as interim president when the former president, Robert Altenkirch, moved to the University of Alabama in 2011.

== President of NJIT ==
Joel Bloom is the first NJIT President without a tenured faculty position at the university. It is a requirement for the position according to the NJIT Faculty Handbook. In contrast to standard processes of finding university presidents, no candidates were interviewed by the time NJIT's Board of Trustees settled on Bloom in an internal process. The five-year contract with NJIT is reported worth roughly $5.3 million, or over ten million during the decade of leadership. This figure is higher when including pension, health insurance, and chauffeur. Among the details of his contract, there is included:

- $120,000 annual “retention incentive” bonus to ensure loyalty to NJIT;
- $85,000 annual housing allowance;
- Performance bonus of up to 25% of his salary. In 2015, it was $130,000.
- Three-fourths of his salary from 2022 to 2024 — $825,000 based on his current pay — as a figurehead and adviser with title president emeritus

President Bloom's contract takes top spot among New Jersey college presidents, making him the highest paid state employee in Newark, where the per capita income of residents is $20,000 annually and 27% of residents fall below the poverty line.

During his time at NJIT, President Bloom oversaw construction of a new 200,000 sq. ft. multipurpose Wellness and Events Center costing over $100 million, which was financed through a mixture of student tuition increases and taxpayer money. NJIT out-of-state tuition increased from $25,334 in 2011 to $33,386 in 2020 ($13,974 to $17,674 in-state tuition).

During this time, NJIT also demolished several landmarked structures around its campus, among them the Warren Street School that had been considered for the National Register of Historic Places. The landmarked school was built from 1892 to 1908 by Newark-based architect Jeremiah O'Rourke. Other demolitions during this period included brownstones and two landmarked brick factories on Newark's Dr. Martin Luther King Jr. Boulevard. As a result, the neighboring James Street Commons Historic District was listed as one of the "ten most endangered" historic places in the state by the non-profit organization Preservation NJ.

On October 6 2023, NJIT renamed the "Wellness and Events Center" to the "Joel and Diane Bloom Wellness and Events Center" to honor the contributions of former NJIT president, Joel Bloom.

== Personal life ==
Joel Bloom is married to Dr. Diane Bloom. They live in Monmouth Beach Borough, New Jersey with their son Ean S Bloom.
