= St. Joseph's Roman Catholic Church Rectory and School =

Historic church in New Jersey, United States

- U.S. National Register of Historic Places
- New Jersey Register of Historic Places
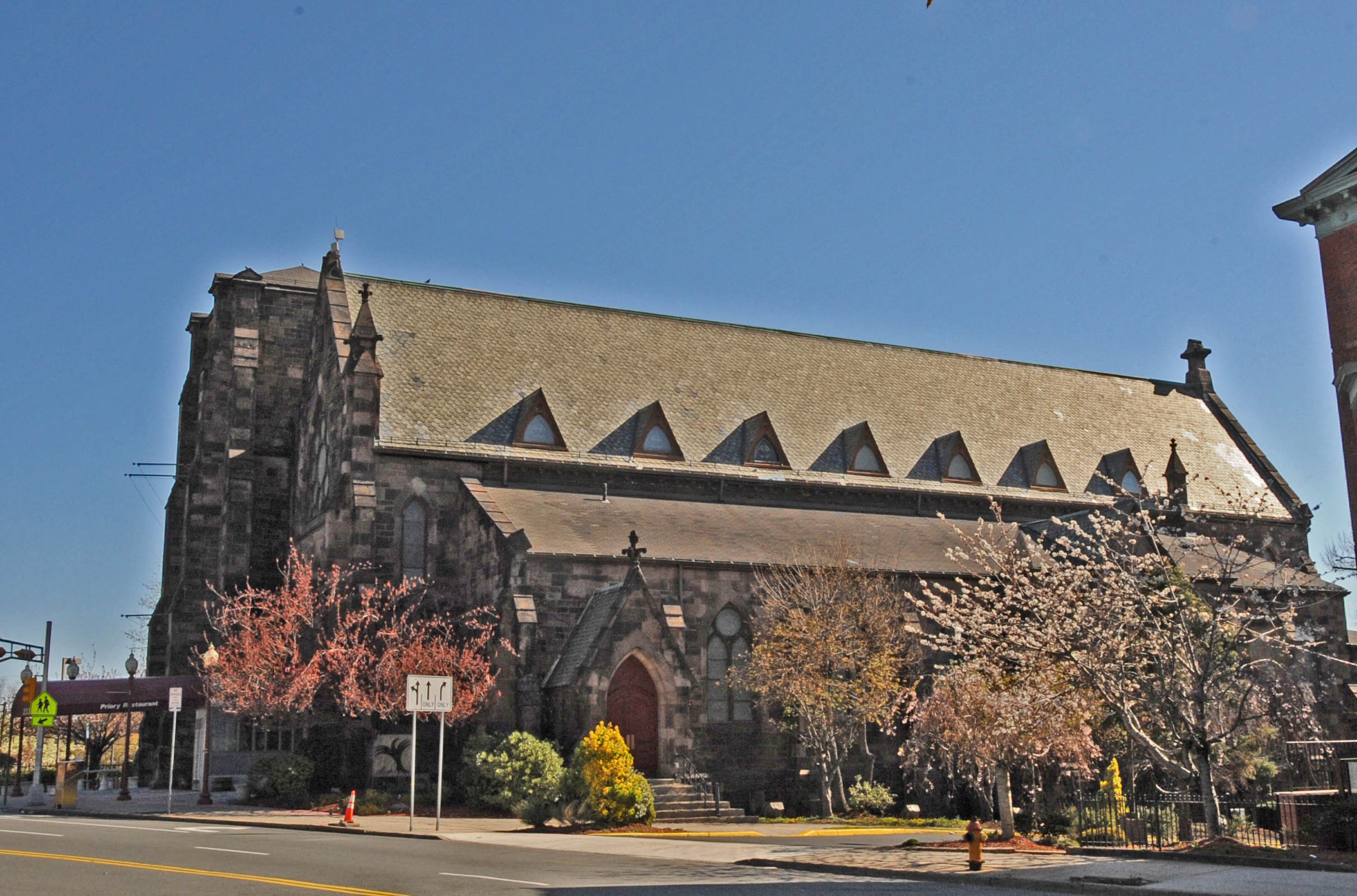

- Location within Essex County, New Jersey Location within New Jersey Location within the United States
- Location: 233 W. Market Street, Newark, New Jersey
- Coordinates: 40°44′35″N 74°11′11″W
- Built: 1871
- Architect: Jeremiah O'Rourke
- Architectural style: Gothic
- NRHP reference No.: 80002486
- NJRHP No.: 1313

Significant dates
- Added to NRHP: December 8, 1980
- Designated NJRHP: October 3, 1980

St. Joseph Plaza is an event venue in Newark, Essex County, New Jersey, which formerly served St. Joseph's Roman Catholic Church, a parish of the Archdiocese of Newark of the Roman Catholic Church. The church was added to the National Register of Historic Places on December 8, 1980, for its significance in architecture and religion.

== Architecture ==
The church was a traditional Gothic Revival brownstone church, with a tall central nave flanked by lower aisles and transepts, oriented with the apse facing east and the three entrance doors facing west, one for each aisle and another along the nave. The nave has a steep slate gable roof. The front façade is asymmetrical, with a square bell tower with flat top on one side. The interior was extensively renovated in the early 1980s, but the exterior, having been registered as a landmark, remained unchanged.

== History ==
The congregation was established in 1859 by James Roosevelt Bayley, first bishop of Newark. The construction of the Morris Canal had bisected the parish of St. Patrick's Pro-Cathedral, and also attracted Catholic immigrant workers to the area, necessitating a new worship space. A two-story brick building was built to serve as the parish's church and school. Fr. James F. Dalton was named its first pastor in 1868, and a stone he had brought back from Glendalough, Ireland was laid as the cornerstone for a new stone church on Thanksgiving Day in 1872. Irish-American architect Jeremiah O'Rourke designed the new church in the Gothic Revival style. Construction was repeatedly delayed, and it was not dedicated until April 18, 1880. A 3-story brick rectory was built in 1885. St. Joseph's School, a 4-story brick building, was constructed north of the church in 1894.

The neighborhood was depopulated by urban renewal projects which cleared out residential areas and saw the expansion of neighboring university campuses, and by white flight after the 1967 Newark riots, accelerating a post-World War II decline in enrollments as parishioners decamped for the suburbs. The congregation had declined to about 30 when the archdiocese closed the parish in 1980, the same year the complex was added to the National Register of Historic Places.

A local housing non-profit, the New Community Corporation, acquired the complex for $105,000 shortly thereafter and began redeveloping it. The church was converted into a restaurant, offices, and performance space, and the rectory into commercial offices; the school building was demolished for parking. It was New Community's first commercial office venture.

== See also ==
- National Register of Historic Places listings in Essex County, New Jersey
