= University of Alabama in Huntsville =

Public university in Huntsville, Alabama, US

The University of Alabama in Huntsville
- Former name: University of Alabama Huntsville Center (1950–1969)
- Type: Public research university
- Established: January 6, 1950; 76 years ago
- Parent institution: University of Alabama System
- Accreditation: SACS
- Academic affiliations: ORAU; Space-grant
- Endowment: $79.5 million (2015)
- President: Donald Leo
- Provost: David Puleo
- Faculty: 520 (fall 2024)
- Students: 8,564 (fall 2024)
- Undergraduates: 6,800 (fall 2024)
- Postgraduates: 1,764 (fall 2024)
- Location: Huntsville, Alabama, United States; 34°43′30″N 86°38′24″W
- Campus: 505 acres (2.04 km^{2}); Midsize city
- Newspaper: The Charger Times
- Colors: Royal blue and white
- Nickname: Chargers
- Sporting affiliations: NCAA Division II – Gulf South; PBC
- Mascot: Charger Blue
- Website: www.uah.edu

The University of Alabama in Huntsville (UAH, formerly known as UAHuntsville) is a public research university in Huntsville, Alabama, United States. It is part of the University of Alabama System and is classified among "R2: High Research Spending and Doctorate Production".

The university offers 94 degrees across its 8 colleges, leading to bachelor's, master's, and doctoral degrees. It is known for its research in astronomy, atmospheric science, and aerospace engineering, and frequently collaborates with NASA on research projects.

== History ==
Presidents
Name	Tenure
Benjamin Graves	(1970–1978)
John Wright	(1978–1988)
Louis Padulo	(1988–1990)
Joseph Moquin	(interim, 1990)
Frank Franz	(1991–2007)
David Williams	(2007–2011)
Robert Altenkirch	(2011–2019)
Darren Dawson	(2019–2021)
Charles Karr	(2021–2026)
Donald Leo	(2026-present)

=== Early history ===
The genesis for a publicly funded institution of higher education in Huntsville was years in the making. Beginning in January 1950 as an extension of the University of Alabama and known as the University of Alabama Huntsville Center, classes were first taught at West Huntsville High School.

However, the university's direction changed in 1961, when Wernher von Braun, a German rocket scientist brought to the United States under Operation Paperclip after working for the Nazi regime, helped create a research institute to provide advanced engineering and science curricula to NASA scientists and engineers. This institute was built off of US 72, shortly thereafter renamed University Drive. Throughout the years, the campus expanded south along Sparkman Drive to reach Interstate 565.

=== Autonomy ===
UAH's first undergraduate degrees were awarded in May 1968 as part of the spring commencement ceremony at The University of Alabama, Tuscaloosa, (although a "cap and gown" ceremony was held in Huntsville). One year later, the University of Alabama System Board of Trustees voted to make UAH an independent and autonomous campus. Benjamin Graves, a 1942 graduate of the University of Mississippi and president of Millsaps College in Jackson, Mississippi, was tapped as UAH's first president in 1970. He returned to faculty status in 1979 and retired in 1989. The first degree awarded for work completed entirely on the UAH campus was awarded to Julian Palmore in 1964. Mr. Palmore was at the time a United States Navy ensign assigned to NASA's Research Projects Division. The first official on-campus graduation ceremony at UAH was in June 1970. The first woman to earn a Ph.D. from UAH was Virginia Kobler in 1979, in Industrial Engineering.

UAH's second president, John Wright, former Vice Chancellor of the West Virginia University, served from 1979 to 1988. UAH's third president was Louis Padulo, former Stanford professor and dean of engineering of Boston University. Huntsville leader Joseph Moquin took over the UAH presidency on an interim basis in 1990. Frank Franz, who was then provost at West Virginia University, was chosen as UAH's fourth president. His wife, Judy Franz, accompanied him and was granted full professorship in the physics faculty. Her renown in the scientific community was reaffirmed when she was named executive officer of the American Physical Society in 1994.

=== 2000s to present ===
At the beginning of the 2006–2007 academic year, Franz announced his plan to step down as president after that year. On July 1, 2007, David B. Williams, formerly a professor of materials science and engineering and the vice provost for research at Lehigh University, began serving as UAH's fifth president. He left in 2011 to join Ohio State University as dean of engineering.

Robert Altenkirch was hired as the university's sixth president in September 2011. Altenkirch served as president of the New Jersey Institute of Technology for nine years before joining UAH. In 2019, Darren Dawson, former dean of the College of Engineering at Kansas State University, became UAH's seventh president. Dawson announced his retirement in November 2021, and Charles L. Karr, former dean of the University of Alabama's College of Engineering, was named interim president, later officially named president in September 2022.

In October 2025, Karr announced plans to retire in May 2026. In Fall 2026, Donald Leo became the 10th president of the university.

=== Mass shooting ===
The university briefly gained national attention in February 2010 when Amy Bishop, a professor at the university, killed three people and wounded three others during a routine meeting of the biology department attended by approximately twelve people. Bishop was charged with one count of capital murder and three counts of attempted murder. On September 11, 2012, she pleaded guilty to the charges after family members of victims petitioned the judge against use of the death penalty. The jury heard a condensed version of the evidence on September 24, as required by Alabama law. The same day, Bishop was sentenced to life in prison without the possibility of parole.

== Academics ==
Fall Freshman Statistics
	Applicants	Admits	% Admitted	Enrolled	Avg GPA
2020	5,793	4,467	77.1	1,345	3.81
2019	5,295	4,372	82.6	1,497	3.9
2018	4,465	3,590	80.4	1,428	3.87
2017	4,322	3,573	82.7	1,340	3.89
2016	4,374	3,337	76.3	1,193	3.73
2015	3,358	2,706	80.6	1,027	3.72
2014	2,104	1,726	67.0	724	3.69
2013	2,054	1,656	80.6	651	3.64
2012	1,938	1,505	77.6	624	3.86
2011	1,952	1,243	63.6	677	3.62

UAH offers 94 degree-granting programs through its eight colleges: the College of Arts, Humanities & Social Sciences (AHS), the College of Business, the College of Education, Sport, and Human Sciences (ESHS), the College of Engineering, the Honors College, the College of Nursing, the College of Science, and the Graduate School. Nursing is UAH's largest single major, although Engineering is the largest college.

UAH is known for its engineering and science programs, including astrophysics, atmospheric science, aerospace engineering, cybersecurity, and digital animation. The first commercial non-rocketry programs (Consort and Joust) in the U.S. were managed by UAH scientists, the first "high-temperature" superconductor was discovered at UAH, and the first U.S. experiment flown aboard the Soviet Mir Space Station was from UAH. UAH is a Space Grant university and has a history of cooperation with NASA's Marshall Space Flight Center and the U.S. Army Aviation and Missile Command at Redstone Arsenal. In conjunction with helping NASA reach its goals, UAH makes NASA's research and technology available to all of Alabama's colleges and universities. The National Space Science and Technology Center is one of 17 high-tech research centers on UAH 505-acre campus.

The UAH Propulsion Research Center (PRC) promotes interdisciplinary research opportunities for graduate and undergraduate students. The PRC was founded by Dr. Clark W. Hawk in 1991 and has since provided support for NASA, the U.S. Department of Defense (DoD), and the U.S. Department of Energy. Research topics include air-breathing and electric propulsion, solid, liquid & hybrid propellant combustion, magnetoinertial fusion, high-temperature materials, and space and terrestrial power systems.

Research in nanotechnology and microfabrication is conducted by the Nano and Micro Devices Center.

Atmospheric Sciences and related research areas are headquartered in the NSSTC and SWIRLL buildings.

At least nine departments or programs also hold accreditation from professional associations, including the Accreditation Board for Engineering and Technology, the American Assembly of Collegiate Schools of Business, the American Chemical Society, the Commission on Collegiate Nursing Education, the Computing Sciences Accreditation Board, The National Association of Schools of Art and Design, and the National Association of Schools of Music.

== Campus ==
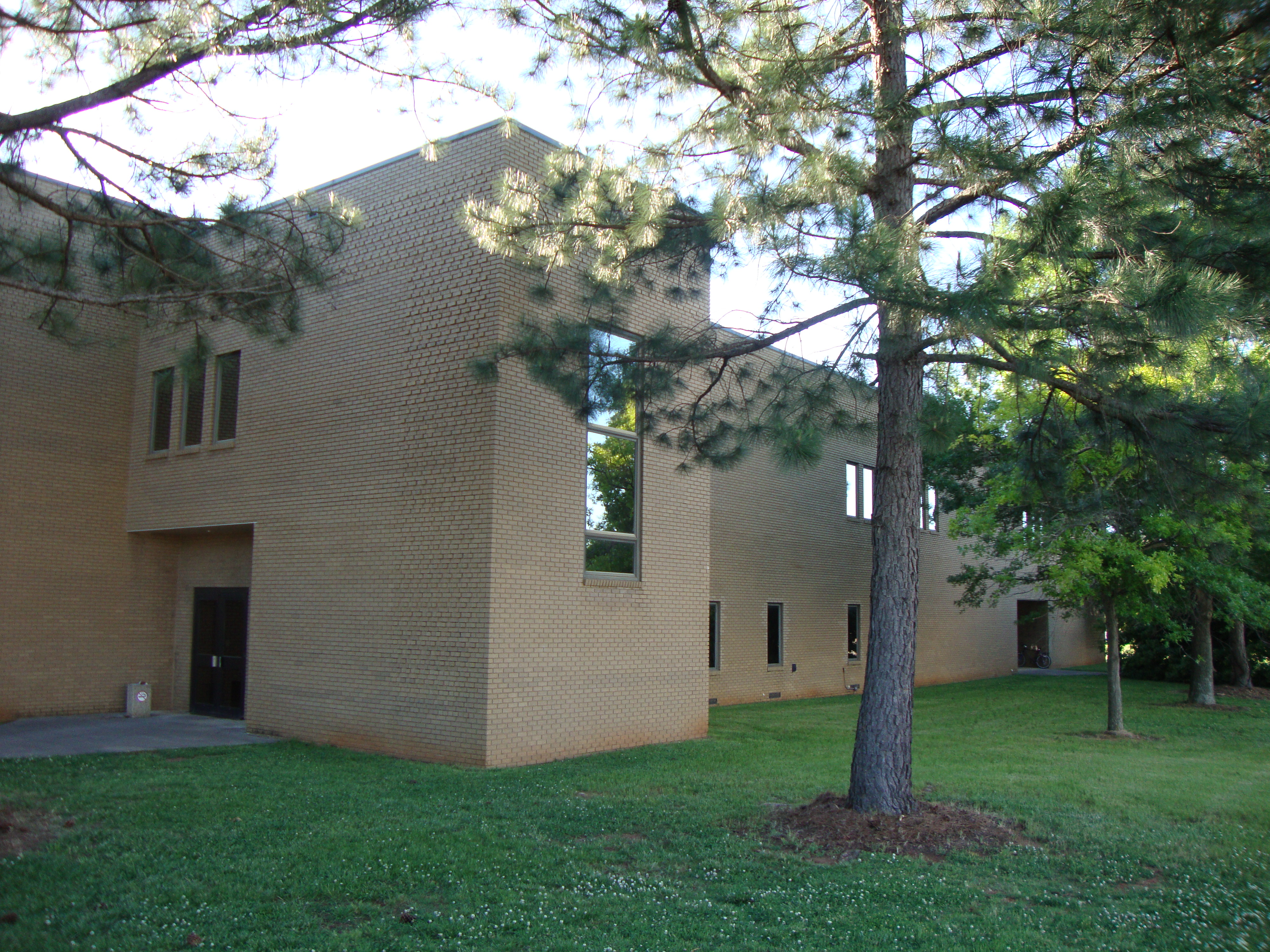
UAH Engineering Building

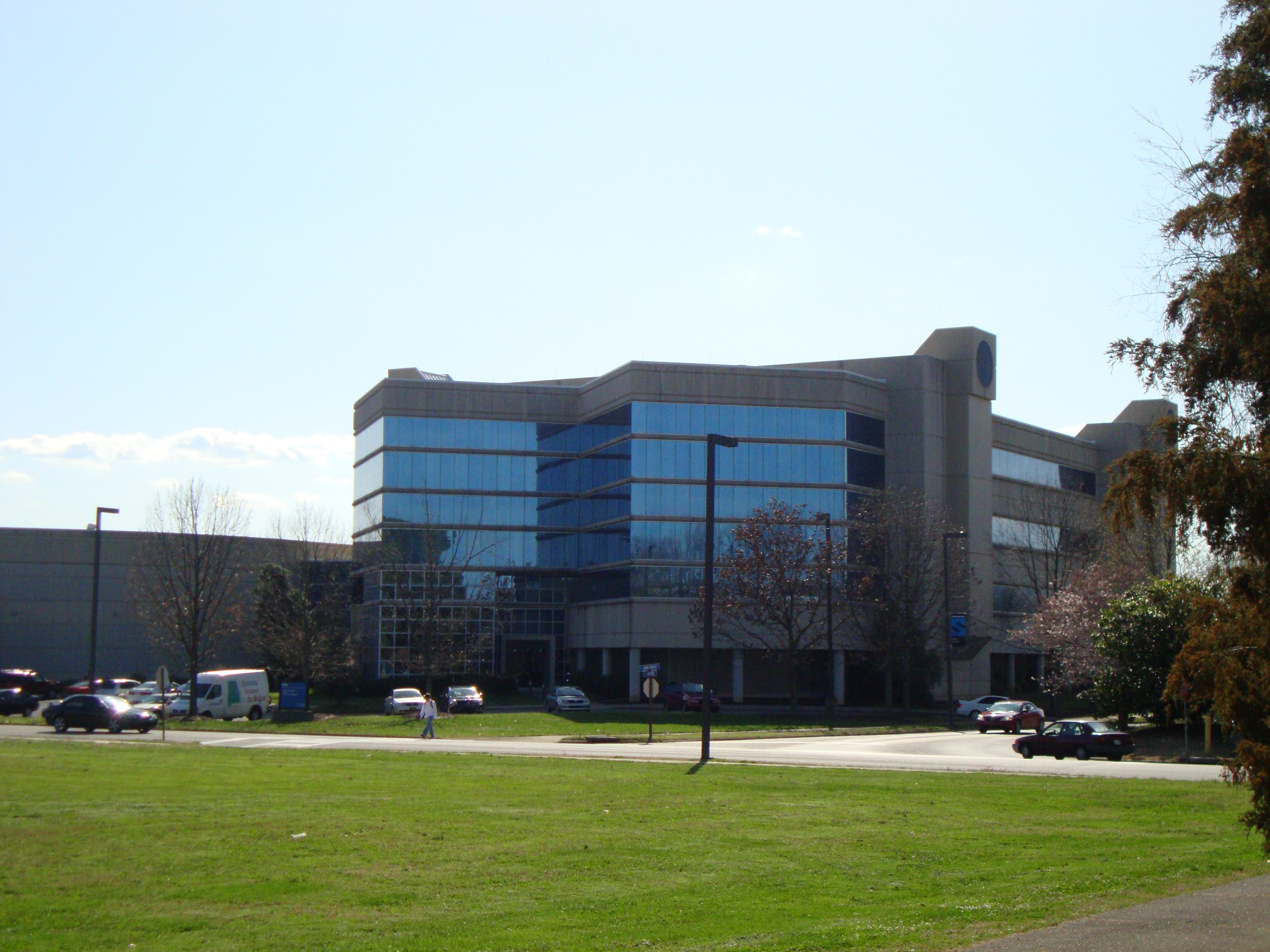
UAH Optics Building

The College of Science houses the Alabama High Field Nuclear Magnetic Resonance (NMR) Center, which is dedicated to providing modern high field NMR capabilities to academic and corporate researchers in the state of Alabama and surrounding areas.

UAH's Earth System Science Center is dedicated to the interdisciplinary study of the Earth as an integrated system with an emphasis on space- and ground-based remote sensing data.

UAH's Department of Biological Sciences partners with the Dauphin Island Sea Lab to offer research opportunities to UAH students through the Marine Environmental Sciences Consortium.

UAH's Psychology Department has eight research labs: Lifelong Learning, Memory and Cognition, Personality Testing and Assessment, Privacy in Cyberspace, Psychobiology, Teamwork and Social Cognition, Employee Engagement and Productivity, and Leadership and Organizational Behavior.

UAH's Propulsion Research Center connects the academic research community and the propulsion community through interdisciplinary collaboration in the following areas: aerospace materials and structures, computational modeling, energy and power systems, fusion propulsion and power, plasmas and combustion, propellants and energetics, and propulsion systems integration.

UAH's College of Engineering is home to two dozen labs.

UAH's Kinesiology Research Lab, located in the College of Education, has an underwater treadmill that enables students to conduct aquatic exercise research on adults with type 2 diabetes and lower-limb amputation.

SWIRLL (Severe Weather Institute – Radar and Lightning Laboratories) is a core research facility dedicated to research on severe and hazardous weather, radar meteorology, lightning meteorology, lightning physics, and air quality. It comprises a research operations center with multiple workstations, a high bay used for the maintenance and fabrication of comprehensive mobile platforms and other instruments, a sounding preparation lab, and five roof platforms to support instrument testing and data collection.

UAH's Learning and Technology Resource Center, located in the College of Nursing, offers high-tech, hands-on clinical experience including high-fidelity simulators, telehealth robots, and laboratory spaces.

UAH's Early Learning Center, an outreach and service unit of the College of Education, provides inclusive early childhood education for children in developmentally appropriate classrooms.

== Rankings ==
Academic rankings

National
- Forbes: 325
- U.S. News & World Report: 244 (tie)
- Washington Monthly: 417
- WSJ/College Pulse: 390

Global
- THE: 601–800
- U.S. News & World Report: 1337 (tie)

UAH ranked 244th among "National Universities" and No. 135 for "Top Public Schools" in the 2025 U.S. News & World Report "Best Colleges" report.

== Athletics ==
UAH sponsors six men's and seven women's varsity athletics programs. In 2016, UAH added men's and women's lacrosse to its varsity athletic programs. UAH is a member of the National Collegiate Athletic Association (NCAA), competing in Division II in 13 sports. UAH is a member of the Gulf South Conference in all sports except men's lacrosse, which plays in the Peach Belt Conference.

Both men's and women's tennis programs were discontinued in June 2020 due to financial difficulties from COVID-19. After a privately funded 2020–2021 season, the men's hockey program was also discontinued in May 2021.

== Student life and activities ==
Undergraduate demographics as of Fall 2023
Race and ethnicity	Total
White	69%
Black	9%
Hispanic	7%
Two or more races	5%
Asian	4%
Unknown	3%
American Indian/Alaska Native	1%
International student	1%
Economic diversity
Low-income (Note: The percentage of students who received an income-based federal Pell grant intended for low-income students.)	23%
Affluent (Note: The percentage of students who are a part of the American middle class at the bare minimum.)	77%

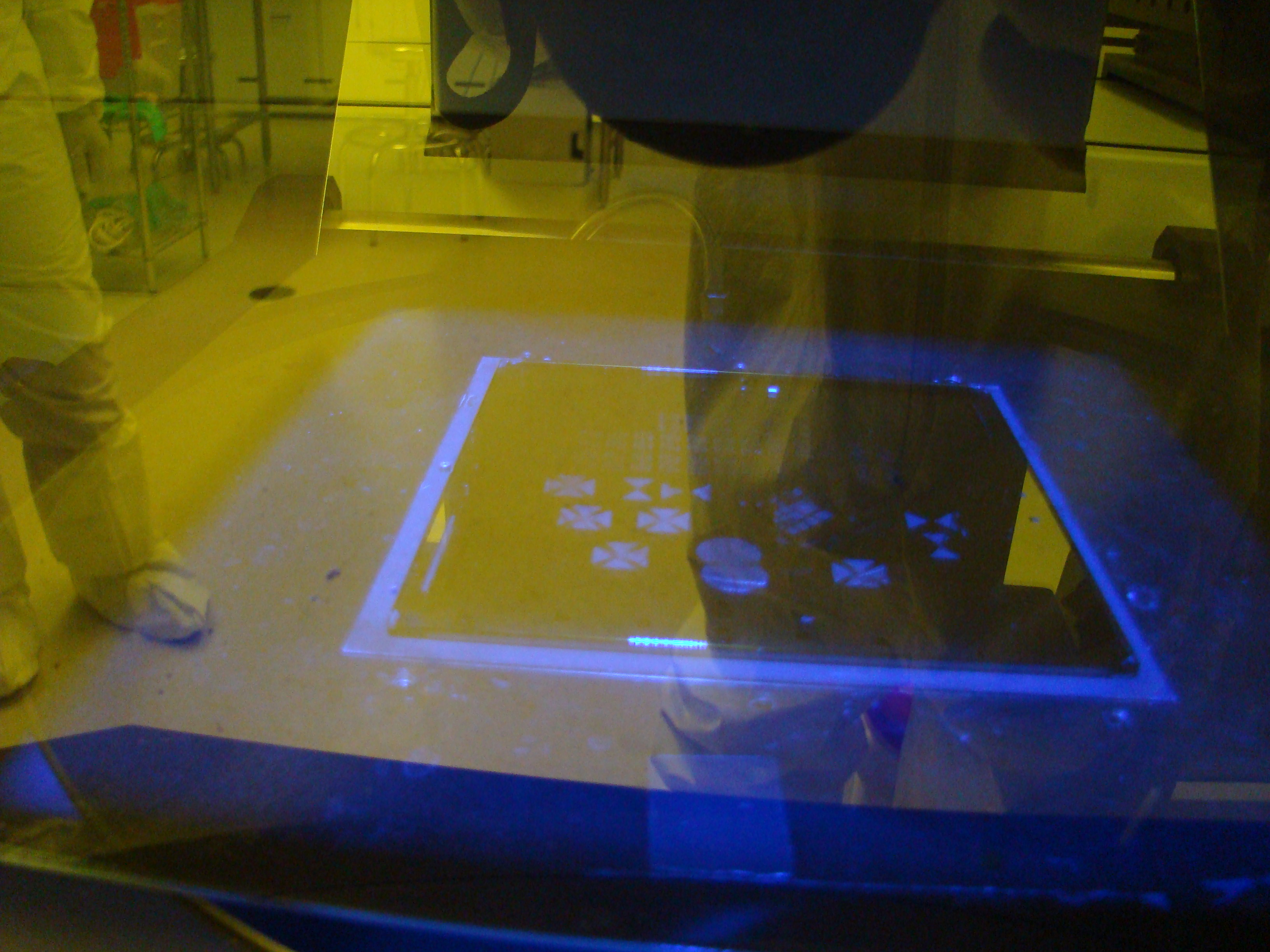
Experiment in lab at UAH

=== Student government ===
The UAH Student Government Association (SGA) is the primary recipient of student-activity funding from UAH's Office of Student Life. The Space Hardware Club, a registered student organization in the College of Engineering is the secondary recipient. The SGA holds an advisory role with campus administrators on activities involving students. The SGA hosts a number of events including Week of Welcome, an annual event welcoming students back to campus that begins the weekend they arrive on campus and runs through the first week of each fall semester.

=== Residence halls ===
UAH has six residence halls: Central Campus, Charger Village Addition, Charger Village Original, Frank Franz, North Campus, and Southeast. Central Campus, Frank Franz, and North are reserved for first-time freshmen. Frank Franz Hall is reserved for first-time Honors College students. Charger Village Addition and Charger Village Original are reserved for sophomores, whereas juniors and seniors have the option of living at the other residence halls.

Campus housing originated with the construction of Southeast Campus Housing. These suites were originally built under the auspices of the late Dr. Benjamin Graves, the first President of UAH, with the assistance of the late Alabama Senator John Sparkman.

=== Greek life ===
UAH is home to several fraternities and sororities. Most Greek organizations rent a fraternity or sorority house from the university. Construction of the original houses was made possible by donations from Mark and Linda Smith and Jim and Susie Hudson.

=== ACE ===
The Association for Campus Entertainment (ACE) is a student run and operated organization that hosts weekly events throughout the academic year as well as standing programs such as Friday Night Flicks, Sunday Cinema, Late-Night Breakfast, and ACE Wednesday. Notable guests include Daniel Tosh and Recycled Percussion.

=== Clubs and organizations ===
UAH has more than 150 student-run organizations on campus. Team UAH has won several concrete canoe construction competitions with five national titles in 1993, 1994, 1996, 1998, and 2001. The National Concrete Canoe Competition is sponsored annually by the American Society of Civil Engineers. The UAH American Society of Mechanical Engineers student chapter also competes in the annual NASA Human Exploration Rover Challenge. It holds two championship titles. The UAH Space Hardware Club conceptualizes, designs, builds, tests, and flies hardware for high-altitude balloons, satellites (ChargerSat Program), the CanSat competition, and high-powered rocketry.

=== Student Success Center ===
The Student Success Center (SSC) offers tutoring for nearly all freshman- and sophomore-level courses offered at UAH. Additional tutoring is available for math courses online and in person.

The SSC recruits university students for its PASS (Peer Assisted Study Sessions) program, in which students sit in on courses that they have already succeeded in, and offers class-specific study sessions outside of class, usually 3 hours per week. Historically difficult freshman courses are targeted for PASS, including calculus, chemistry, and economics.

== Notable alumni and faculty ==
=== Alumni ===
Name	Class year	Notability	Reference(s)
Lori Mann Bruce		Seventh Chancellor of the University of Tennessee at Chattanooga (2025-)	
Werner J. A. Dahm	1978	Emeritus Professor of Aerospace Engineering at The University of Michigan, Professor at Arizona State University, former Chief Scientist of the U.S. Air Force	
Jan Davis	1983, 1985	Astronaut (STS-47, STS-60, STS-85)	
Marta Grande	2009	Italian Parliament Representative and from June 2018 President of the Foreign Committee of Chamber of Deputies of the Italian Parliament	
Jeffrey S. Harper	1993	Executive Director of Graduate Programs in the Scott College of Business at Indiana State University	
John Hendricks	1974	Founder and chairman of Discovery Communications	
Steve Hettinger	1974	Alabama State Representative (1982–1988), Mayor of Huntsville (1988–1996)	
Josh Magette	2012	National Basketball Association Point Guard (Atlanta Hawks, Orlando Magic)	
Scott Munroe	2006	Professional ice hockey player	
Toyin Odutola	2008	Artist	
James Record		Former chairman Madison County Commission and Alabama State Senator	
Jared Ross	2005	Professional ice hockey player	
Travis S. Taylor		Researcher and science fiction author	
Cameron Talbot	2010	National Hockey League goaltender (New York Rangers, Edmonton Oilers, Calgary Flames, Minnesota Wild)	
Violet Edwards	2014	First Black woman elected to the Madison County Commission	
Destin Sandlin	2003, present	American YouTube personality	
James Lomax	2017	member of the Alabama House of Representatives	
JJ Kaplan	2021	American-Israeli basketball player in the Israeli Basketball Premier League	

=== Faculty ===
Name	Department	Notability	Reference
Mustafa A.G. Abushagur	Electrical and Computer Engineering	Founding president of RIT Dubai and the interim Deputy Prime Minister of Libya	
John Christy	Atmospheric Science	Distinguished Professor of Atmospheric Science and director of the Earth System Science Center	
T. J. Chung	Mechanical and Aerospace Engineering	Distinguished Professor of Mechanical and Aerospace Engineering	
Lawrence J. DeLucas	Materials Science	STS-50	
H. E. Francis	English	Fulbright professor	
Michael D. Griffin	Mechanical and Aerospace Engineering	11th Administrator of the National Aeronautics and Space Administration, eminent scholar and professor	
Owen Garriott	Biological Sciences	Skylab 3, STS-9, and adjunct professor in the Laboratory for Structural Biology after his NASA career	
Roy Spencer	Atmospheric Science	Winner of American Meteorological Society Special Award and NASA Exceptional Scientific Achievement Medal (both with John Christy)	
