= John Jelliff =

American furniture designer (1813–1893)

- Born: July 30, 1813; Norwalk, Connecticut, U.S.
- Died: July 2, 1893 (aged 79)
- Occupations: Furniture designer and manufacturer
- Parent(s): Hezekiah Jelliff; Nancy Bennett

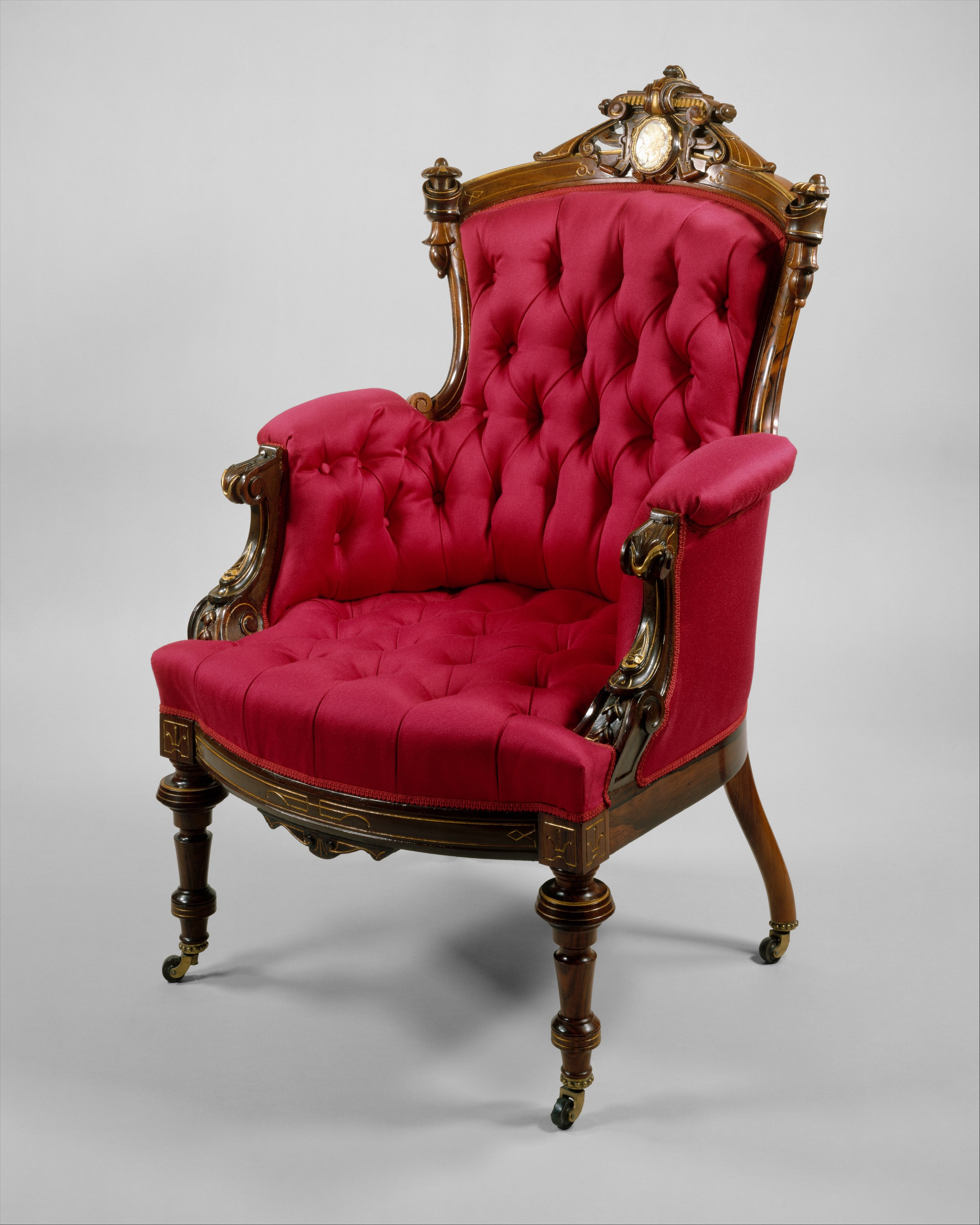
John Jelliff armchair in the Metropolitan Museum of Art

John Jelliff (July 30, 1813 – July 2, 1893) was an American furniture designer and manufacturer, based in Newark, New Jersey during the second half of the 19th century. By the 1850s, John Jelliff & Co. had become the leading furniture manufacturer in New Jersey.

By 1843, J.Jelliff's was located at 301-303 Broad Street, and by 1876, John Jelliff & Co. was the largest furniture establishment in Newark, located at 794 & 796 Broad Street.

Furniture with the Jelliff & Co. (or J.J. & Co.) maker's mark are exceedingly scarce. Most pieces can only be attributed to the firm.

== Biography ==
Born in Norwalk, Connecticut. Son of Hezekiah Jelliff and Nancy Bennett. John Jelliff apprenticed to Alonzo W. Anderson, a cabinetmaker in New York City in 1828, and moved to New Jersey in the early 1820s. He first worked for Lemuel M. Crane of Newark, and took over the Crane business in 1838. Jelliff then partnered with Thomas L. Vantilburg through 1843. In 1854, Jelliff partnered with Henry H. Miller, who served as his foreman. By the late 1850s Jelliff's work reflected the Italian renaissance style; he later found inspiration in the designs of John Henry Belter.

By 1874, the Jelliff factory had 40,000 square feet (3,700 m^{2}) of floor space, employed 45 men and did annual sales of $100,000 (equivalent to $2.8 million in 2025), catering to the needs of the leading families in Newark. Jelliff retired in 1890. In spite of the industrialization of his time, Jelliff refused to produce machine-made furniture. The company produced rosewood, walnut and mahogany furniture with the occasional use of a fruitwood or maple as inlay.

The company was an integral part of Newark's manufacturing history. "Perhaps the history of no single firm has been more closely interwoven with the progress of Newark in wealth, culture and refinement than John Jelliff & Co."

Jelliff Avenue in Newark is named after John Jelliff.

A large collection of pencil sketches and drawings in Jelliff's hand survives, showing that he was the firm's chief designer. The drawings are held by the Newark Museum.

== Furniture styles ==
The firm produced furniture in several revival styles, including: Gothic revival (1825 – 1865), Louis XVI revival (1860-1890), and Renaissance Revival (1860-1885)

== Museum collections ==
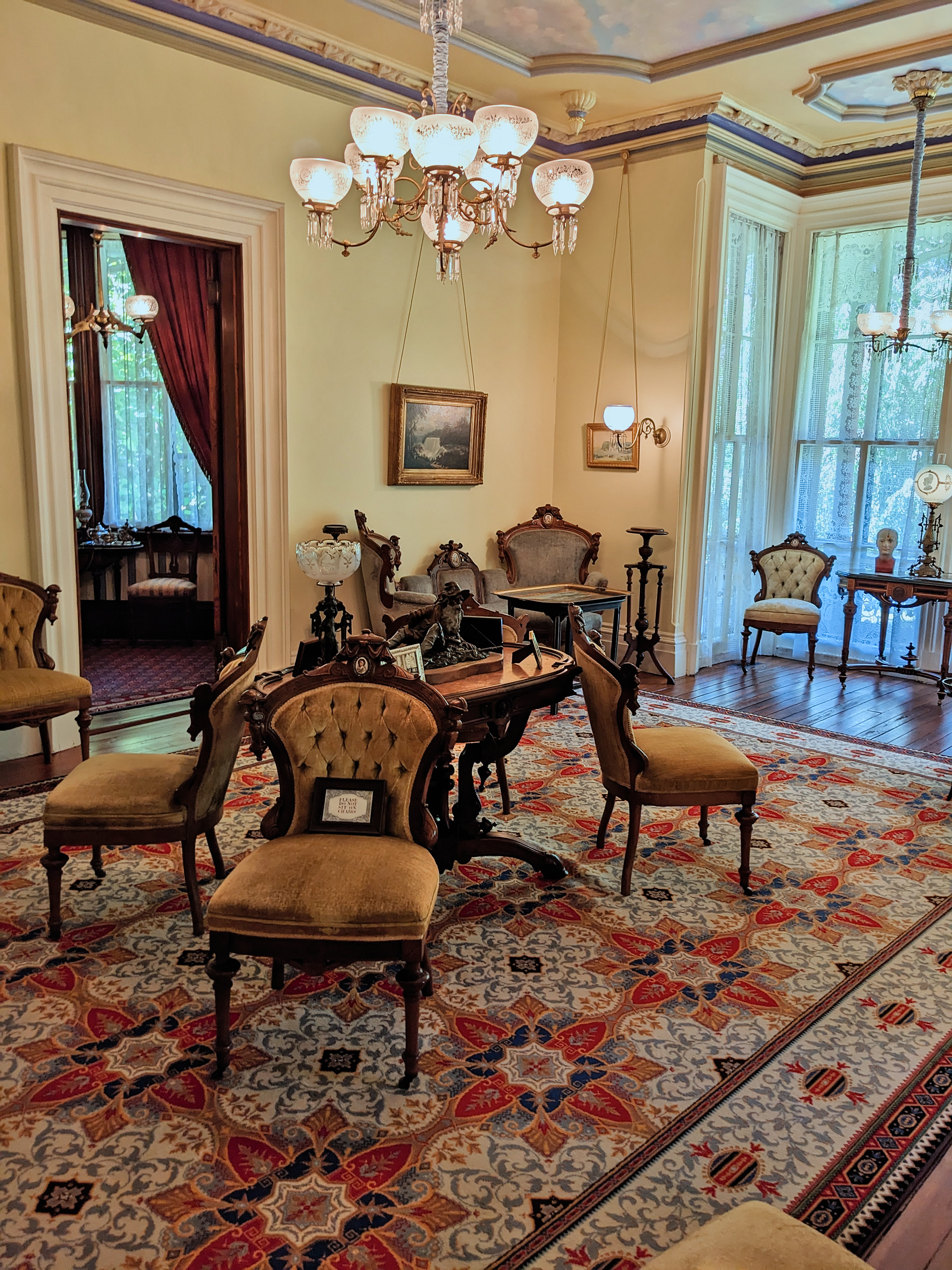
The Salon at the Armour-Stiner House

One of the best-known undertakings of Jelliff & Miller is a parlor suite from the 1870s, consisting of a sofa, armchair and four side chairs, now in the Ballentine House, which adjoins the Newark Museum. Jelliff's crowning achievement in carved furniture is the bishop's throne, dating to about 1850, in Newark's St. Patrick's Roman Catholic Church. The throne is "one of the chief monuments to the Gothic revival style in America." Jelliff also designed the cover of the church's baptismal font.

Jelliff's work is also included in the permanent collections of numerous museums, including:

- Metropolitan Museum of Art - 68.133.3
- New Jersey Historical Society - 1989.42.1
- Museum of Fine Arts in Boston - 1990.258
- Brooklyn Museum - 1994.18
- Indianapolis Museum of Art at Newfields - 79.148
- Museum of Arts and Sciences in Daytona Beach

== Sources ==
- Antiques, The Magazine, June 1946; August 1972; May 1986; April 1990
- "Century of Revivals: Nineteenth-Century American Furniture", The Newark Museum Quarterly, vol. 31, no. Spring / Summer 1980, ISSN 0098-3373, OCLC 2241638
- Dubrow, Eileen (2000), American furniture of the 19th century, Schiffer Publishing, Limited, ISBN 978-0-7643-1080-5
- Early Furniture Made in New Jersey, 1690-1870. Newark Museum. 1958.
- Hamilton Van Hoesen, Walter (1973), "Jersey Cabinetmakers", Crafts and Craftsmen of New Jersey, Rutherford [N.J.] Fairleigh Dickinson University Press, pp. 63–64, ISBN 978-0-8386-1080-0
- MacDonald, William (1959), Central New Jersey Chairmaking of the Nineteenth Century
- Proceedings of the New Jersey Historical Society, October 1958
- White, Margaret E. (October 1958), "Some early furniture makers of New Jersey", Antiques, vol. 74, no. 4, p. 325
