= Saint Mary's Catholic Church Complex =

Historic church in New Jersey, United States

- U.S. National Register of Historic Places
- New Jersey Register of Historic Places
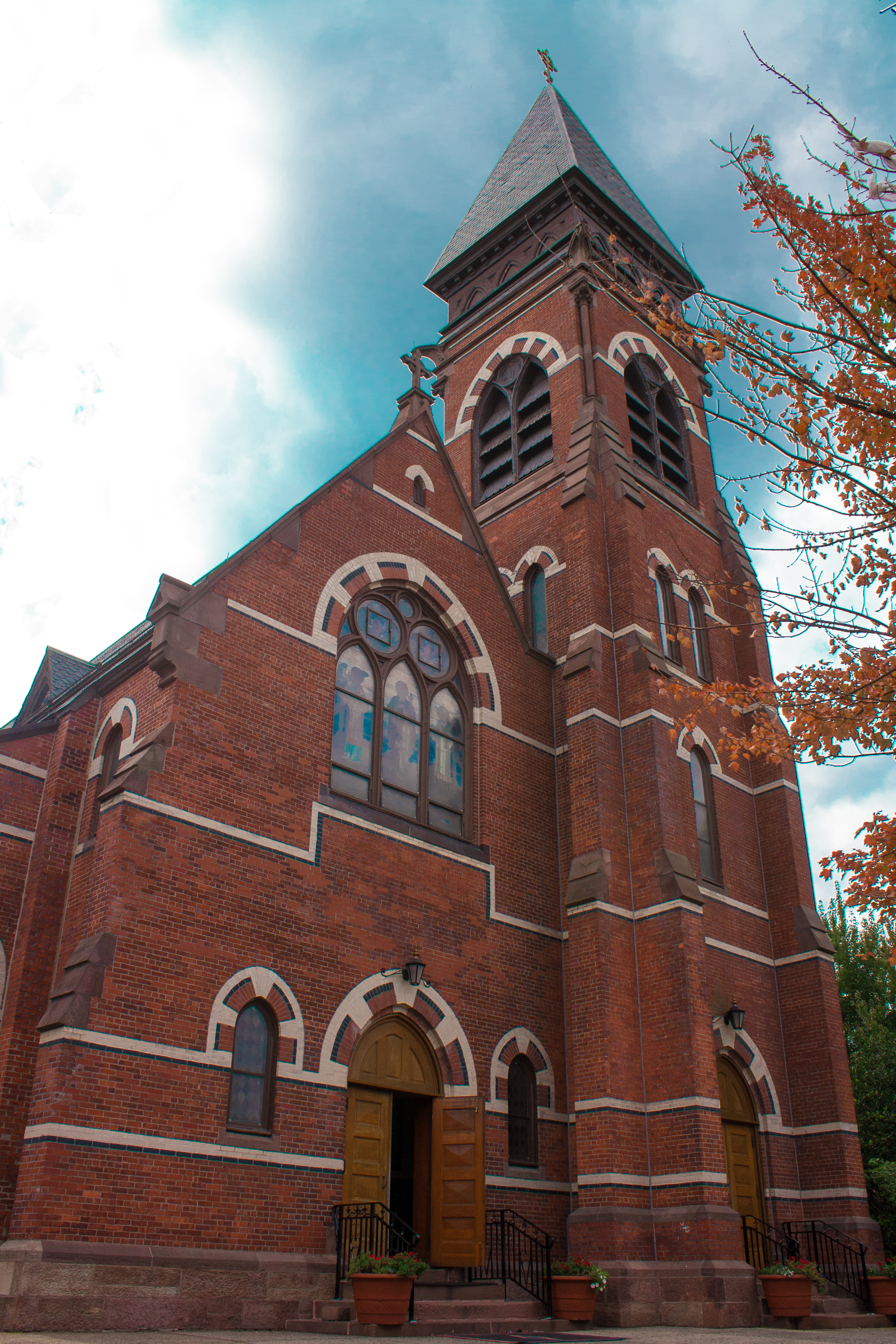
- The main church building at St. Mary's Catholic Church in Plainfield.

- Location within Union County, New Jersey Location within New Jersey Location within the United States
- Location: Liberty and W. 6th Streets, Plainfield, New Jersey
- Coordinates: 40°36′39″N 74°25′26″W
- Area: 3.1 acres (1.3 ha)
- Built: 1875–1880
- Architect: Jeremiah O'Rourke
- Architectural style: Gothic, High Victorian Gothic
- NRHP reference No.: 85000785
- NJRHP No.: 2706

Significant dates
- Added to NRHP: April 11, 1985
- Designated NJRHP: January 28, 1985

Saint Mary's Catholic Church Complex is a historic Catholic parish church located within the Archdiocese of Newark at Liberty and W. 6th Streets in the city of Plainfield in Union County, New Jersey, United States. The complex, including the church, rectory, convent and school, was added to the National Register on April 11, 1985, for its significance in architecture and religion.

== History and description ==
The church was designed featuring High Victorian Gothic architecture by Irish-American architect Jeremiah O'Rourke and built from 1875 to 1880 with red, yellow, and black brick. The rectory was built in 1880 and also features High Victorian Gothic architecture. The three-story Victorian Gothic convent was built in 1910. The two-story Collegiate Gothic school was designed by architect James S. Piggott and built in 1931.

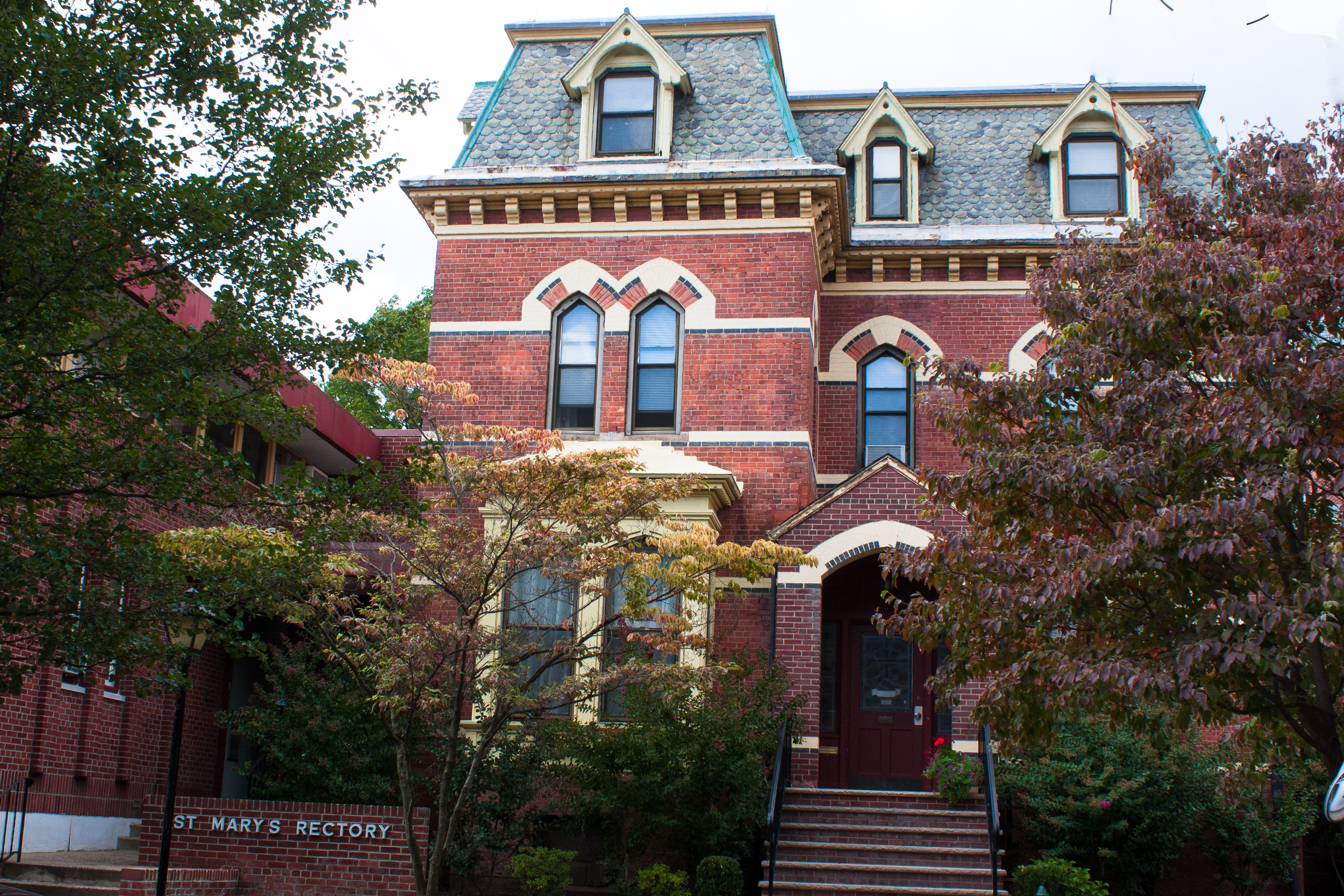
St. Mary's Rectory

== See also ==
- National Register of Historic Places listings in Union County, New Jersey
