= David B. Williams (materials scientist) =

British academic

- Education: University of Cambridge
- Scientific career
- Fields: Material science
- Workplaces: Lehigh University
- Thesis: Precipitation reaction in dilute aluminium-lithium alloys (1974)

David Bernard Williams was the dean of the College of Engineering at the Ohio State University from 2011-2021. He was previously the fifth president of the University of Alabama in Huntsville in Huntsville, Alabama from March 2007 until April 2011, and Vice Provost for Research and Harold Chambers Senior Professor of Materials Science and Engineering at Lehigh University in Bethlehem, Pennsylvania.

Williams was born in Leeds, England, and holds B.A., M.A., Ph.D., and Sc.D. degrees from the University of Cambridge where he also won four Blues in rugby and athletics.

His research and teaching interests’ include:

- Analytical/Transmission and scanning electron microscopy (X-ray microanalysis, electron energy-loss spectrometry and convergent-beam electron diffraction)
- Applications to interfacial segregation and bonding changes
- Texture and phase-diagram determination in metals and alloys for aerospace and power-generation
- Structure determination in glasses

Together with C. Barry Carter he is the co-author of a 4-volume textbook entitled Transmission Electron Microscopy: A Textbook for Materials Science. held in over 340 libraries, as well as co-editor of two other books. He is author or co-author of 207 peer-reviewed journals and articles as listed by Scopus, and the former editor of Acta Materialia and the Journal of Microscopy.

His wife, Margaret, is a native of the Netherlands and was raised in Australia. The couple has three sons.

== Honors ==
- Fellow of the Royal Microscopical Society (U.K.), 1977
- Fellow of the Institute of Metals (U.K.), 1985–1996
- Fellow of American Society for Materials International, 1988
- President of the Microbeam Analysis Society, 1991–1992
- President of the International Union of Microbeam Analysis Societies, 1994–2000
- Fellow of The Minerals, Metals and Materials Society
- Doctor of Science (Sc.D.) Cambridge University, 2001
- American Welding Society, Warren F. Savage Memorial Award for the best paper published in the Welding Journal, 2004
- First recipient of the Duncumb Award of the Microbeam Analysis Society, 2007
- Fellow of the Microscopy Society of America, 2010
- Honorary Member of the Microbeam Analysis Society, 2014

Academic offices
Preceded by Frank Franz	President of the University of Alabama in Huntsville; 2007–2011	Succeeded by Robert Altenkirch
