= Robert Altenkirch =

American academic

Robert A. Altenkirch was an American academic and university president. He was the president of University of Alabama in Huntsville and the New Jersey Institute of Technology.

== Early life ==
Altenkirch earned a B.S. from Purdue University, a M.S. from the University of California, Berkeley, and a Ph.D. from Purdue University, all in Mechanical Engineering. While an undergraduate at Purdue, Altenkirch became a member of the Sigma Alpha Epsilon fraternity.

== Career ==
From 1988 to 1995, Altenkirch was professor of mechanical engineering and dean of the College of Engineering at Mississippi State University (MSU). While dean of engineering at MSU, he led the effort to secure National Science Foundation (NSF) funding for the establishment of the MSU Engineering Research Center for Computational Field Simulation in 1990.

He was a professor and chair of mechanical engineering at the University of Kentucky and a professor of mechanical and materials engineering and dean of the College of Engineering and Architecture at Washington State University. He was vice president for research at Mississippi State University.

From 2003 until 2011, Altenkirch was the seventh president of the New Jersey Institute of Technology (NJIT). On September 21, 2011, Altenkirch was named the new president of the University of Alabama in Huntsville. He retired from the position in June 2019.

He is the author of over fifty publications and nearly 100 presentations in combustion and heat transfer. He was a principal investigator for ten Space Shuttle experiments investigating the spread of fire in reduced gravity. He is a Fellow of the American Society of Mechanical Engineers. He is a member of Tau Beta Pi.

Academic offices
| Preceded by Saul Fenster | President of New Jersey Institute of Technology; 2003–2011 | Succeeded by Joel Bloom |
| Preceded by David B. Williams | President of the University of Alabama in Huntsville; 2011–2019 | Succeeded by Darren Dawson |
