= Warren Street School (Newark, New Jersey) =

Former historic school building

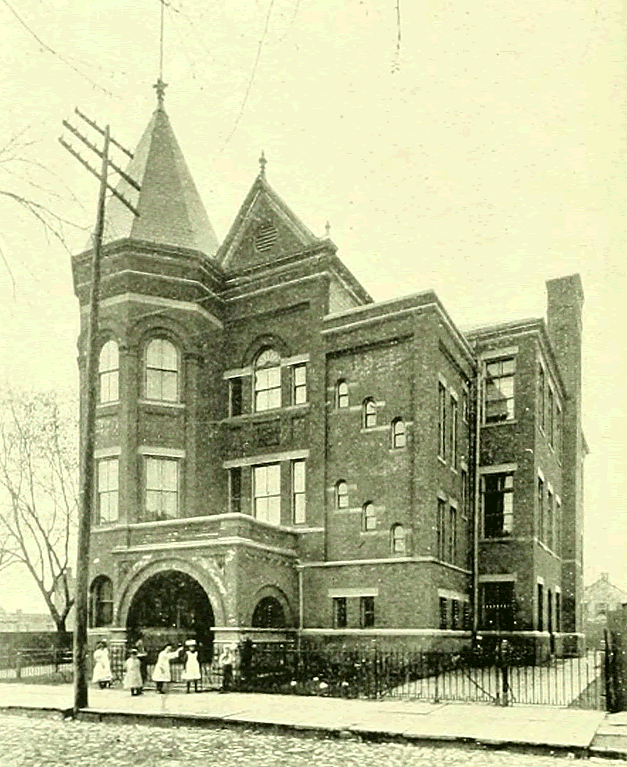
- The school in 1897

General information
- Location: Newark, New Jersey
- Coordinates: 40°44′40″N 74°10′58″W
- Owner: Newark Public Schools; New Jersey Institute of Technology

Construction
- Architect: Jeremiah O'Rourke
- Architectural style: Gothic Revival architecture

Other information
- Status: Demolished

Key dates
- Construction: 1892–1908
- Demolition: 2021
Location

The Warren Street School, a landmark eligible for the National Register of Historic Places, was located at 197-207 Warren Street in Newark, New Jersey. Designed by Newark-based architect Jeremiah O'Rourke, it was the third oldest public school in the country’s third oldest city. Developer RISE Real Estate demolished the landmark in 2021 at the direction of the New Jersey Institute of Technology.

== Construction ==
Construction began in 1892 and was completed by 1908 on land that had been the site of a public school since 1848. The brick construction with terracotta details and slate roof with copper-frame dormer windows and turrets was representative of the Richardson Romanesque and Queen Anne style popular in the 1880s. The three-story building consisted of two parts, an original 1892 castle-like structure on Warren Street and a 1908 addition on Wickliff Street. Both structures consisted of masonry wall construction with wooden beam supporting floors made of pine and oak. Both structures were interconnected and formed an L-shaped structure around the school’s auditorium.

Nearly fifty years ago, James Searing, a generous-hearted man owning a large tract of land in the western part of the city, donated a plot at the corner of Wickliffe and School Streets to the city for school purposes. Here, in 1848, was built a plain two-story brick school-house, the third public school of Newark. At that time the male and female departments were under separate managements, the former on the top floor and the latter on the lower, each having an assembly room and two small recitation rooms. The school was afterward divided into six class-rooms.

— Essex County, NJ, Illustrated 1897,

== Operation ==
The school was in continuous operation from 1848 to 2006 and served generations of German, Italian, Irish, and African-American Newark schoolchildren. In later years, with the guidance of Newark historian Clement Alexander Price, the school refocused its curriculum around teaching American history and employed Ras Baraka as school teacher before he became mayor of Newark. As Newark lost half its population from white flight and urban abandonment from the 1950s to present day, the number of school-age students dropped, as did the need for as many public schools buildings. At time of closure, the school employed 28 teachers and served 216 students in kindergarten through 8th Grade.

== Demolition ==
After closure in 2006, the school was used to store archives from the Newark Public Schools system, was appraised at 3.3 million, and sold for 2.2 million around 2018 to Claremont Properties, Inc., acting on behalf of the New Jersey Institute of Technology. The building was purchased with intention to demolish. Within days of NJIT’s acquisition, a fire was started on May 1, 2019, in the school’s basement, causing damage to one room and the wood floor of the classroom above in the 1908 building. Aside from this part, the rest of the building was intact, but the fire was used as pretext for demolition.

Despite protests from Newark residents, historians, and some NJIT students, as well as concerns from faculty at NJIT’s College of Architecture and Design that adaptive reuse was feasible, NJIT leadership insisted on demolition and site remediation at a cost of 1.8 million dollars. The city approved demolition on April Fool’s Day 2021 and demolition work began with crews removing windows and handmade century-old terracotta details with jackhammers, while the rest of the ornamental brickwork was crushed into rubble for landfill. Due to a bureaucratic technicality, the school had been considered for landmark status, but the application was not formalized by the time demolition began. As a result of demolition and community protests, the nearby James Street Commons Historic District was named by Preservation NJ as one of the ten most endangered historic places in the state. Other landmarks like the old Essex County Jail, which is just one block from the former Warren Street School and is on the National Register of Places, are also at risk of demolition as part of the same redevelopment plans.

Learn from the past.

Live in the present.

Plan for the future.

— Warren Street School motto, posted at front entrance in display case that demolition crews crushed up and disposed in dumpster

== Gallery ==
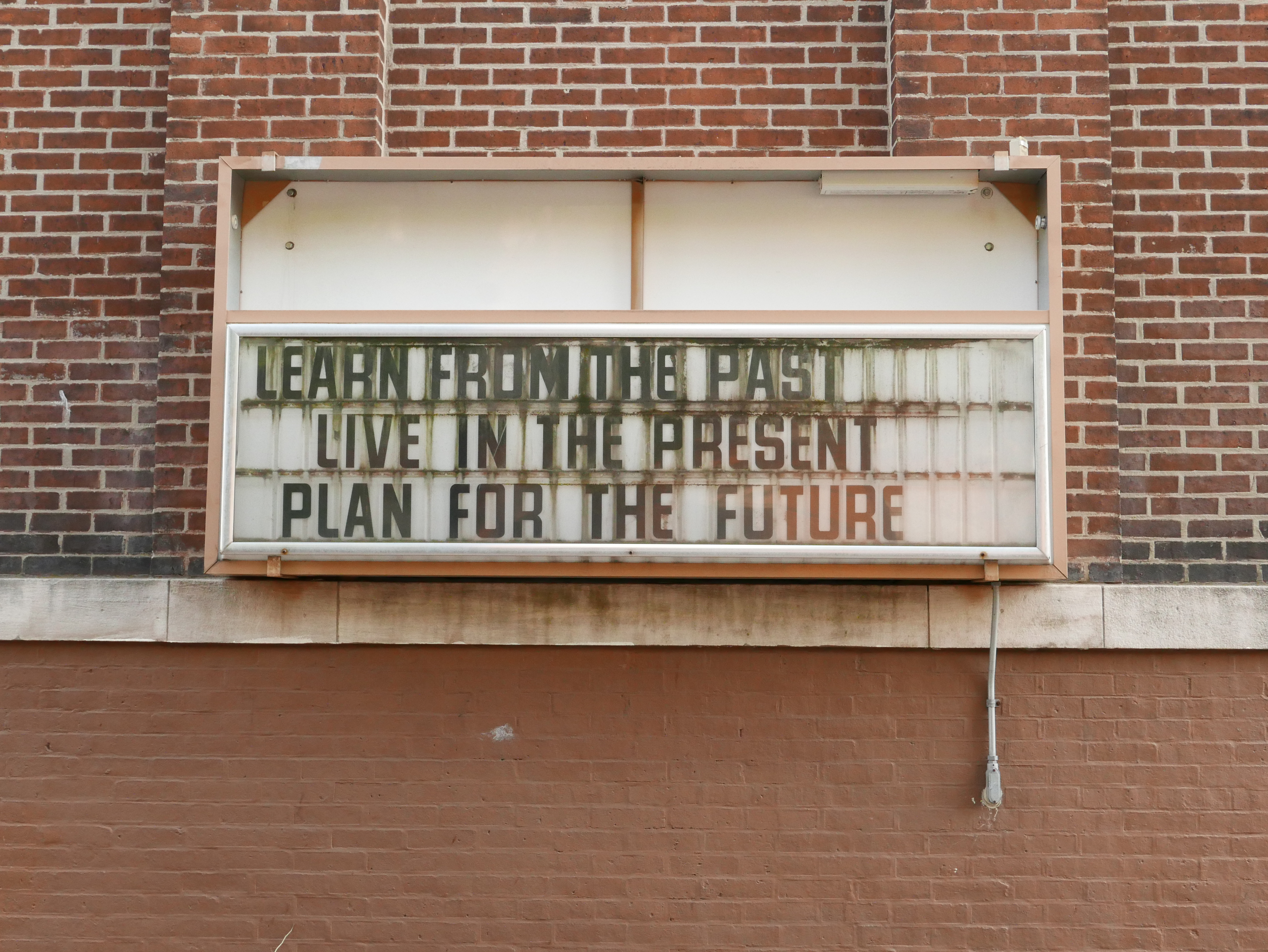
Entrance sign before demolition

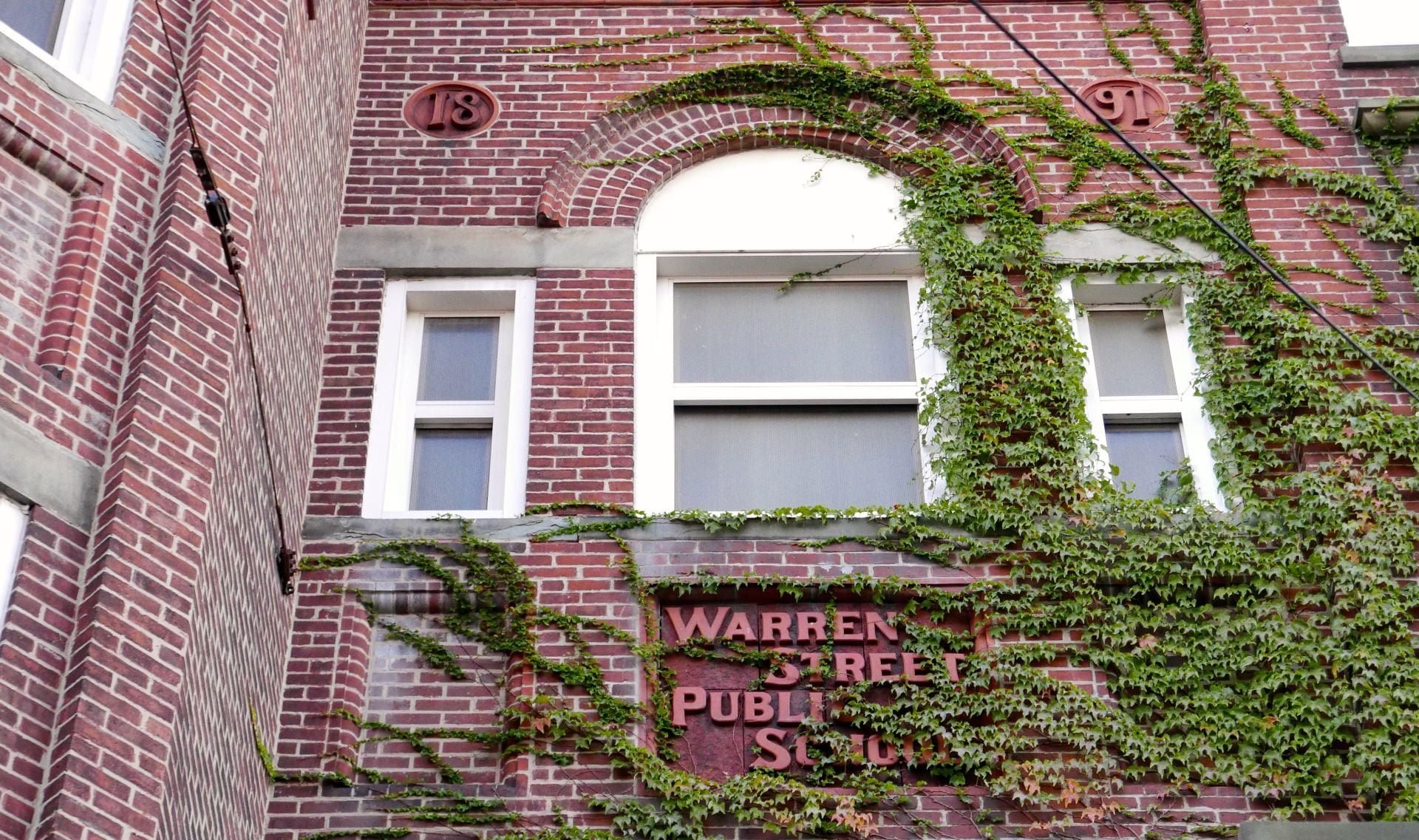
Terracotta ornament before demolition
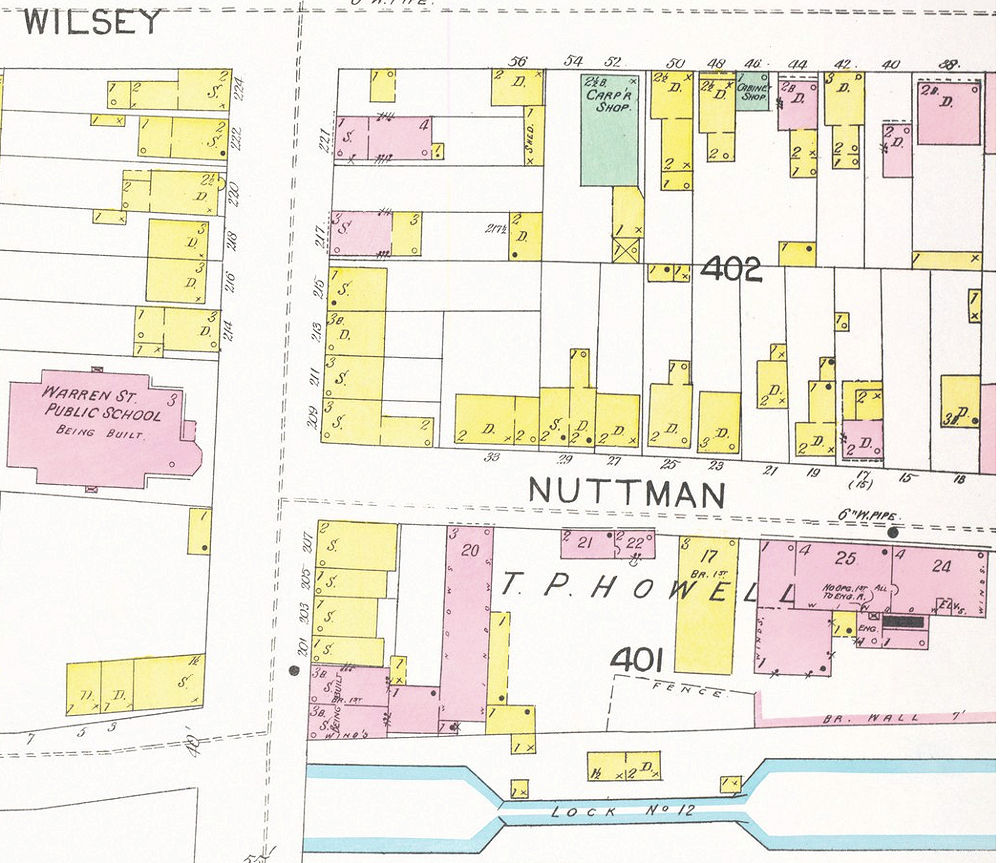
Warren Street School from c. 1892 map of Newark

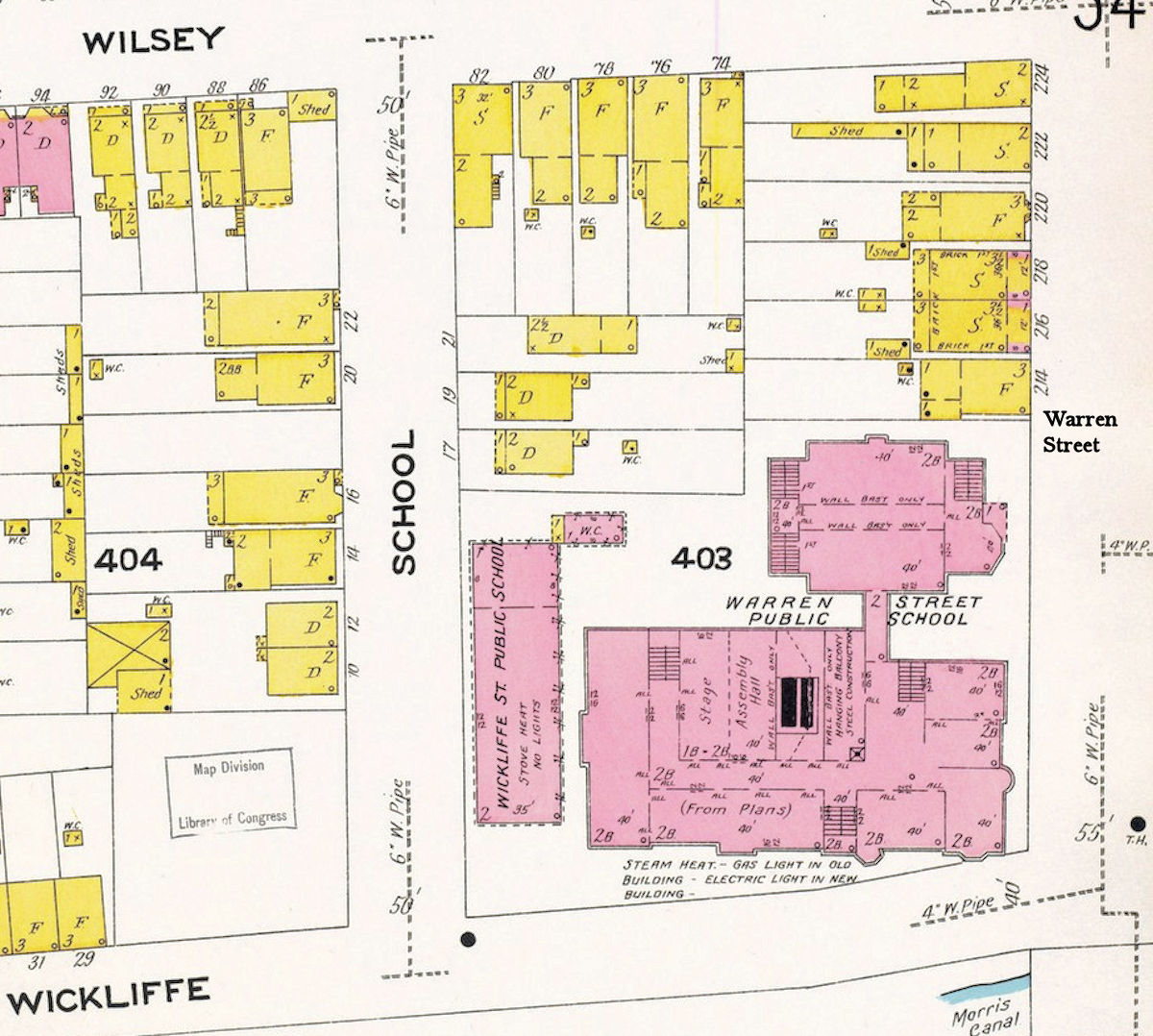
Warren Street School from c. 1908 map, showing floor plan and rooms

== Related landmarks by the same architect ==
- Cathedral Basilica of the Sacred Heart
- Old Post Office (Washington, D.C.)
- Saint Michael's Medical Center
- 45 Burnet Street in Newark, home of architect
