= Pro-Cathedral of Saint Patrick in Newark =

Historic church in New Jersey, United States

- St. Patrick's Pro-Cathedral
- U.S. National Register of Historic Places
- U.S. Historic district – Contributing property
- New Jersey Register of Historic Places
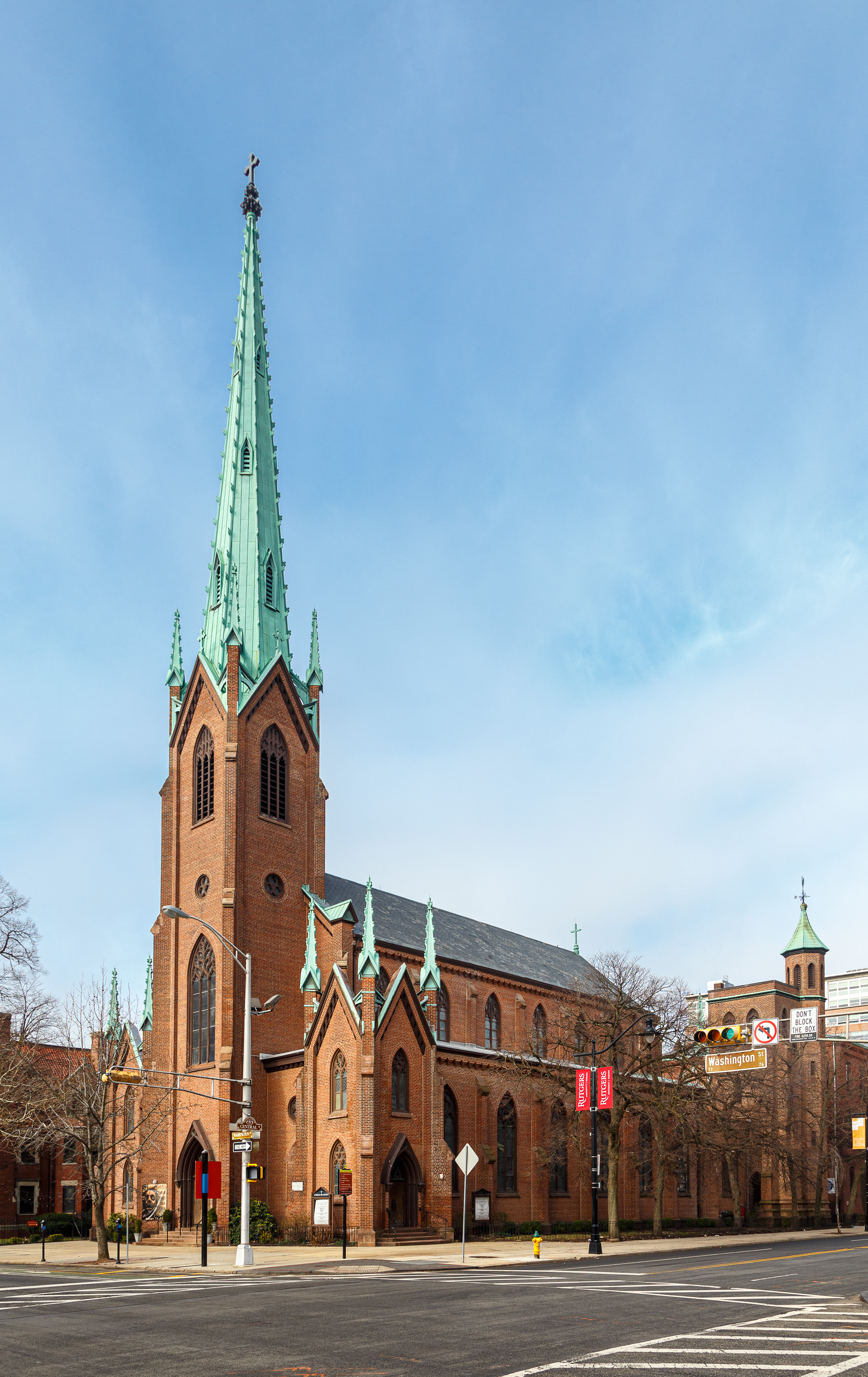

- Location within Essex County, New Jersey Location within New Jersey Location within the United States
- Location: Washington Street and Central Avenue; Newark, New Jersey
- Coordinates: 40°44′31″N 74°10′21″W
- Built: 1846
- Architects: Father Patrick Moran; Patrick C. Keely
- Architectural style: Gothic Revival
- Part of: James Street Commons Historic District. (ID78001758)
- NRHP reference No.: 72000791
- NJRHP No.: 1316

Significant dates
- Added to NRHP: November 3, 1972
- Designated CP: January 9, 1978
- Designated NJRHP: August 1, 1972

St. Patrick's Pro-Cathedral is a pro-cathedral of the Roman Catholic Church in the United States, located in Newark, New Jersey within the Archdiocese of Newark. It was added to the National Register of Historic Places on November 3, 1972, for its significance in architecture, art, religion, and social history. It was added as a contributing property of the James Street Commons Historic District on January 9, 1978.

== Description ==
Saint Patrick was built in 1846 and served as the seat of its prelate bishop from 1853 until the completion of the Basilica of the Sacred Heart. The red brick building features Gothic Revival architecture and a 150 ft (46 m) tall central tower with copper spire.

The building has undergone extensive rehabilitation over the past fifteen years following years of declining membership. Several traditions remain, connecting the parish to its history as the "Old Cathedral" of Newark, including the 12:15 Ash Wednesday Liturgy with the Archbishop, the 12:15 Sunday Liturgy on Easter in memory of the 1916 Easter Rising in Dublin, the annual Newark Fire Department memorial Mass, and many other archdiocesan and Irish-heritage events. The parish is also the national shrine to Our Lady of El Quinche.

== History ==
With the influx of Irish and German immigrants in the 1840s, Bishop John Hughes of New York authorized Rev. Patrick Moran, pastor of St. John's Parish, to build a new church. The building was probably designed by architect Patrick Keely of Brooklyn. The property was the Thomas Ward estate. When it was sold at auction, several parishioners purchased the lots.

Bishop Hughes laid the cornerstone on Sept. 17, 1848. Rev. Louis Dominic Senez, assistant at St. John's was named the first pastor. The church was dedicated on March 10, 1850. St. Patrick's was the third Catholic church in Newark, after St. John's and the German parish of St. Mary's. The old ward mansion became an Orphan's Asylum. Father Senez set up his residence in the same building, where he tended the children during the smallpox epidemic the following year.

In 1853, the Diocese of Newark was created, and James Roosevelt Bayley named bishop. He designated St. Patrick's as the pro-cathedral until such time as a cathedral could be built. He appointed Rev. Bernard McQuaid as rector. Following the Pontifical Mass welcoming the bishop, McQuaid hosted the diocesan clergy at a dinner, but had to sell his horse and buggy to cover the expense. The Sisters of Charity of New York were brought in to manage to the Orphan's Asylum.

To accommodate the increased ceremonies of a cathedral, McQuaid added a sacristy. The addition of the Chapel of St. Vincent de Paul in 1859 created room for another 400 people. John Jelliff of John Jelliff & Co of Newark designed the bishop's chair as well as the cover of the baptismal font. Although forbidden to volunteer as a Union chaplain, in the spring of 1864 McQuaid managed to visit Fredericksburg, Virginia and tended to the wounded and dying soldiers.

== Present day ==
The parish serves both a small Catholic community in downtown Newark and a larger community of commuters who work in Newark.

== See also ==
- List of Catholic cathedrals in the United States
- List of cathedrals in the United States
- National Register of Historic Places listings in Essex County, New Jersey
