= Saint Michael's Medical Center =

Hospital in Newark, New Jersey, United States

Coordinates: 40.743703°N 74.174014°W

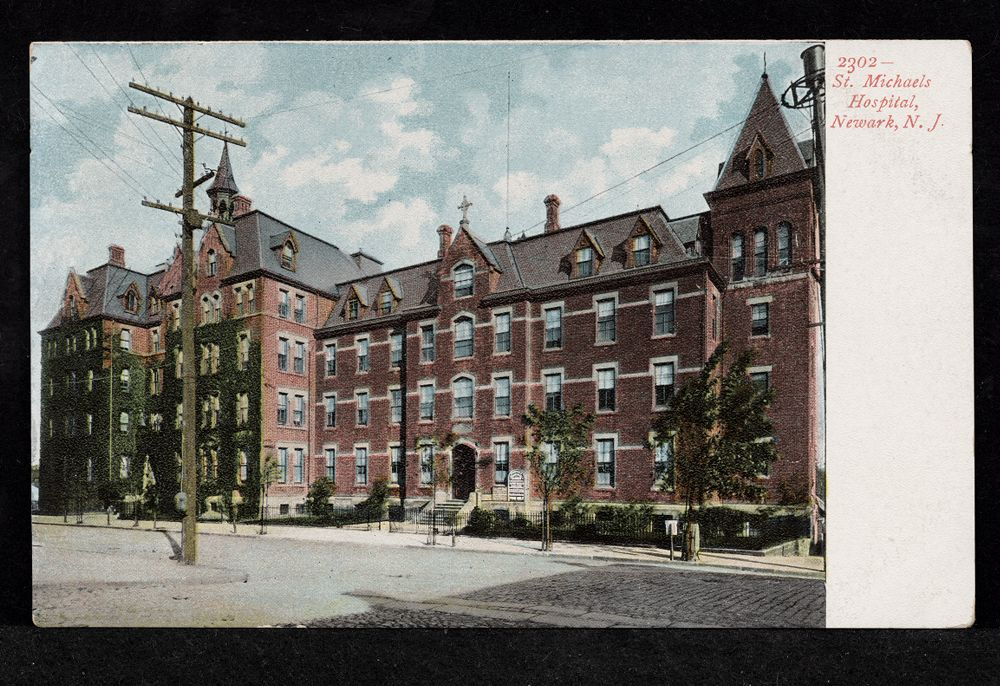
Postcard of St. Michael's Hospital in Newark, N.J., 1935

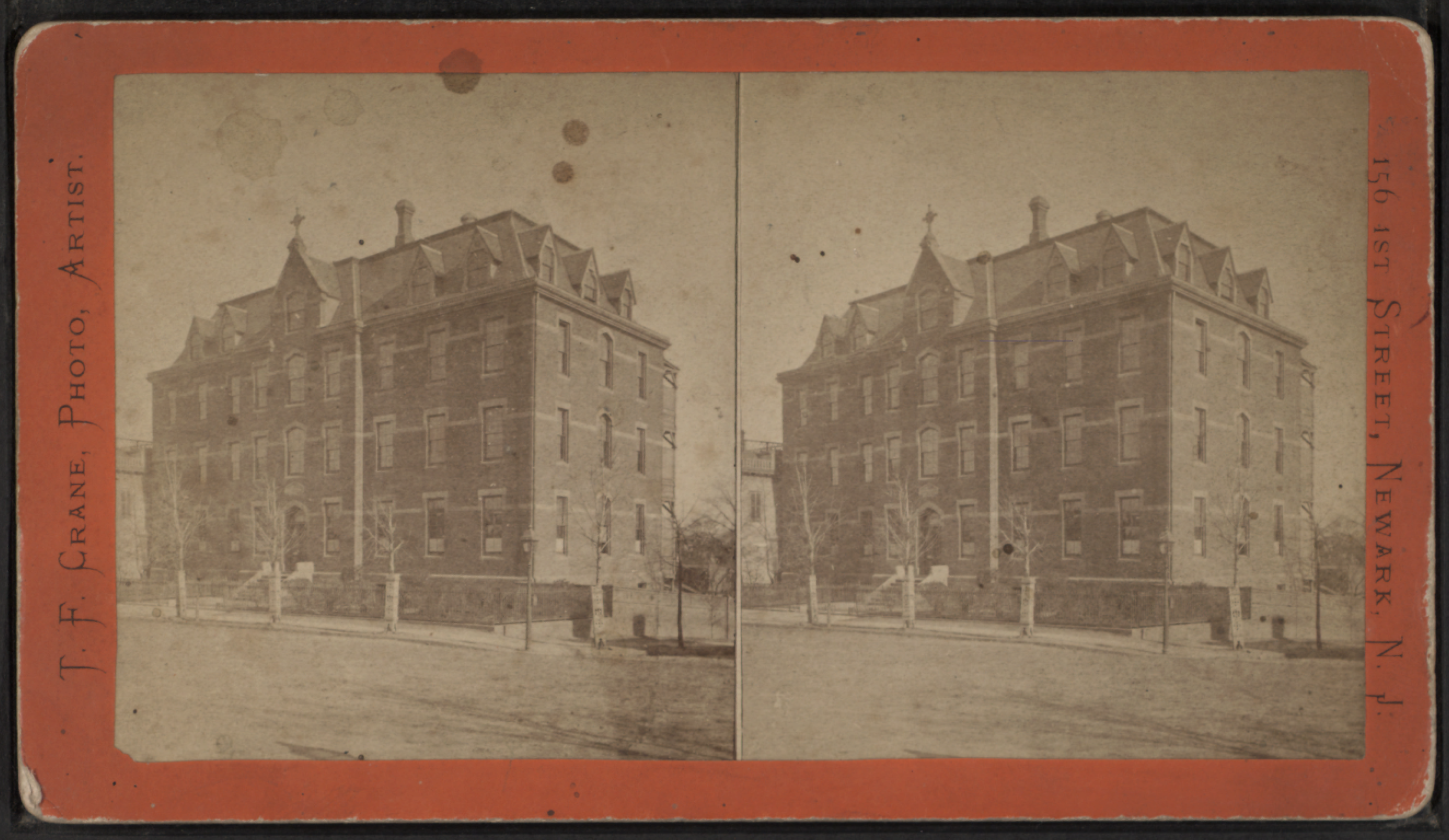
Early stereoview image of St. Michael's Hospital, ca. 1875

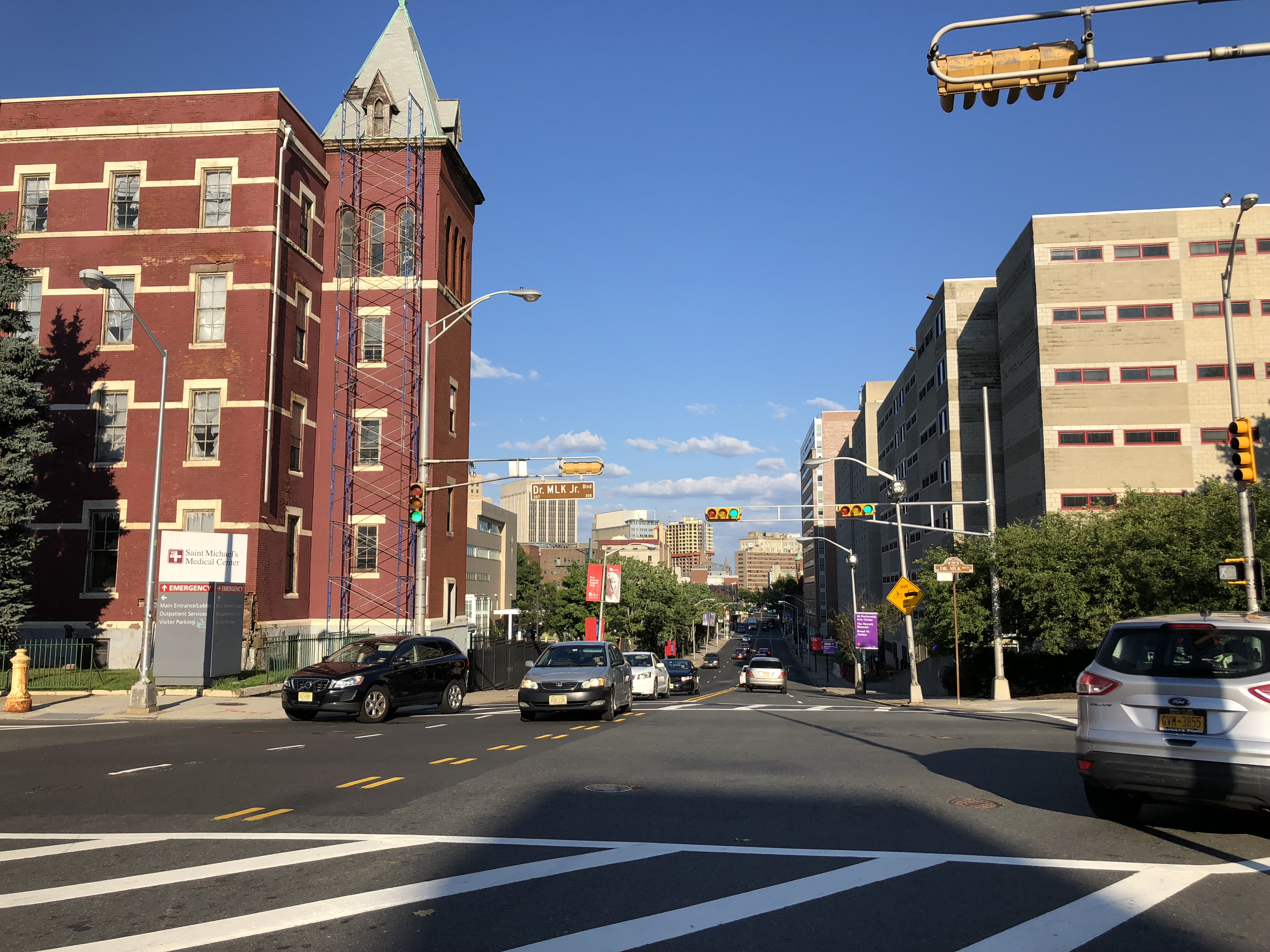
St. Michael's Medical Center (left) in 2018

Saint Michael's Medical Center is a 358-bed hospital located at 111 Central Avenue in Newark, New Jersey. It was opened on May 13, 1867, by four members of the Franciscan Sisters of the Poor as Hospital of the Sisters of the Poor of St. Francis. The four nuns, Sr. Monica Voss (superior), Sr. Fortulana Menzen, Sr. Ewalda Mittler, and Sr. Masssea Keenan, and a postulant, Bridget McDonald, had been previously serving St. Mary's Hospital in Hoboken, NJ. It was incorporated as St. Michael's Hospital by the State of New Jersey on March 9, 1871. Under its charter, the Catholic Bishop of Newark was head of the Board of Directors, but in practice it continued to be managed by the Sisters. One of the three earliest voluntary hospitals in New Jersey, it was initially supported through public donations, but by 1875 it received some support from the diocese and the city.

== Facilities ==
The original building was a converted residence containing 13 beds. By July 1869, 10 sisters were looking after 34 inpatient beds, with demand for more. In 1869, the cornerstone was laid for a new building, designed by Jeremiah O'Rourke. The 3-story, 150 bed, red brick hospital, located on the corner of Central Ave. and Dr. Martin Luther King Jr. Blvd., was opened in 1871. It was described in 1873 as "a bijou of a hospital, perfect in all its accommodations from cellar to attic, and it would be difficult to overpraise its administration and equipment."

In 1895 the hospital doubled its number of beds. By 1914 a third wing was added with 127 beds. In 1930 a nursing school was opened and in 1942 a maternity wing. In 1959 the hospital contained 500 beds. The first cardiac care clinic in the state was opened at St. Michael's in 1937, and the first open heart surgery in the state occurred there in 1959.

== Patients ==
St. Michael's accepted patients of any race, but placed them in separate wards. St. Michael's was one of several hospitals that were open to patients of any creed, despite rumors to the contrary.

"I take advantage of this opportunity to contradict a rumor that has been started by some one unfriendly to the institution ... that Protestant clergymen are not admitted to visit patients of their own faith. This is entirely untrue, and they are welcome at any hour of the day or night to attend any one who may need their services." St. Michael's, 1873

A review of the patient register for 1870 indicates that 245 patients were recorded at the hospital in that year. They were young (median ages between 21-30, mostly male (three to one), and foreign born (25 patients who had been born in American tended to be children or adolescents). Many were Irish Catholics, but about 1/5 were Protestant. Women were servants or housewives, and 39% of the men were laborers. The few skilled occupations included machinist and hatmaker, two teachers, a surgeon and a veterinarian (both under 30). Teenage girls worked as domestic servants, while teenage boys were laborers or craftsmen. Only two patients were listed as "unemployed." Only one patient was recorded as black. (In 1872 1003 patients were seen, of whom 12 were black.)

Most were treated for conditions that would normally have been treated at home, underscoring that the patient population lacked resources and support. Many diagnoses indicate poverty, infections, or dangerous occupations. One in five patients were submitted due to malaria. Other diseases included typhoid fever, tuberculosis and "rheumatism" (rheumatic heart disease). Job-related injuries included fractures, bruises, lacerations, sun stroke, concussions and skull fractures. There was little indication of criminal violence.

== Staff ==
- Edgar Holden, 1838-1909, physician
- Charles F. J. Lehlbach, 1835-1895, Visiting house surgeon, 1890

== See also ==
- List of the oldest hospitals in the United States
- List of hospitals in New Jersey
