= Columbus Hall, Orange, New Jersey =

Historic building in Orange, New Jersey, US

Columbus Hall
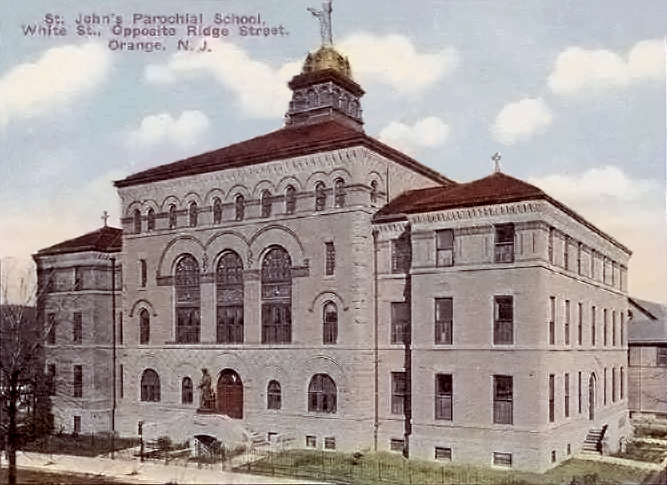
- Columbus Hall, Orange, New Jersey. Jeremiah O'Rourke, 1894.
- Interactive map of the Columbus Hall area

General information
- Location: 455 White Street, Orange, New Jersey
- Coordinates: 40°46′36″N 74°13′57″W
- Construction started: 1892
- Completed: 1894
- Owner: Archdiocese of Newark

Columbus Hall, located in Orange, New Jersey, US, is a historic building which housed both a school and a theatre. Designed by Jeremiah O'Rourke of Newark, the building was named to commemorate the 400th anniversary of the landing of Christopher Columbus in the new world. The cornerstone was laid by Newark Bishop Winand Wigger on April 9, 1893, and construction was completed in December 1894.

Columbus Hall stands on one of the most commanding spots in the city, directly opposite St. John's Church (also designed by O’Rourke) at White and Ridge Streets. It most notably housed the parish school, St. John's School, an institution that had been established 32 years earlier in 1862.

== Architectural features ==
Built in a generally neo-Renaissance style, the building measures 150 feet (46 m) wide and 76 feet (23 m) deep and is constructed of buff-colored brick with stone belt courses and ornamental terra cotta trimmings. The main entrance of the building is reached by matching stone staircases, one on each side. Along the front of the first story of the main building, over the windows and doors, is a row of massive arches of cut stone: the central arch, over the entrance, bears the inscription, "Columbus Hall."

The building features a dome which was originally surmounted by a large gilded statue of the Sacred Heart of Jesus, approximately 25 feet (7.6 m) tall and with its arms extended. For many decades the statue was floodlit at night, making it visible for miles around. The statue was knocked over by a windstorm in September 2012, and subsequently removed. The refurbished statue was restored to the cupola in October 2025. A large bronze statue of Christopher Columbus stood at the main entrance of the building until about 1970, when it was vandalized and replaced by a smaller marble statue.

== Theatre ==
The third and fourth floors feature a theatre, 70 feet (21 m) wide and 48 feet (15 m) high (from the proscenium arch). The stage is 70 feet (21 m) wide by 25 feet (7.6 m) deep. The theatre includes balcony seating, acclaimed at the time because the balconies were hung from the roof trusses by heavy iron rods encased in brass, avoiding the need for support columns that would obscure the view for those in the main theatre.[3] The theatre ceiling was once adorned by a large crystal chandelier and topped by a dome 28 feet (8.5 m) in diameter. With a seating capacity of 1,150, the theatre was completely equipped with dressing rooms, stage settings, scenery, and gas-lit foot lamps, and featured an iron "fire-proof" curtain and a proscenium arch composed of brick. At the request of the local fire department, the theatre was closed in about 1958.

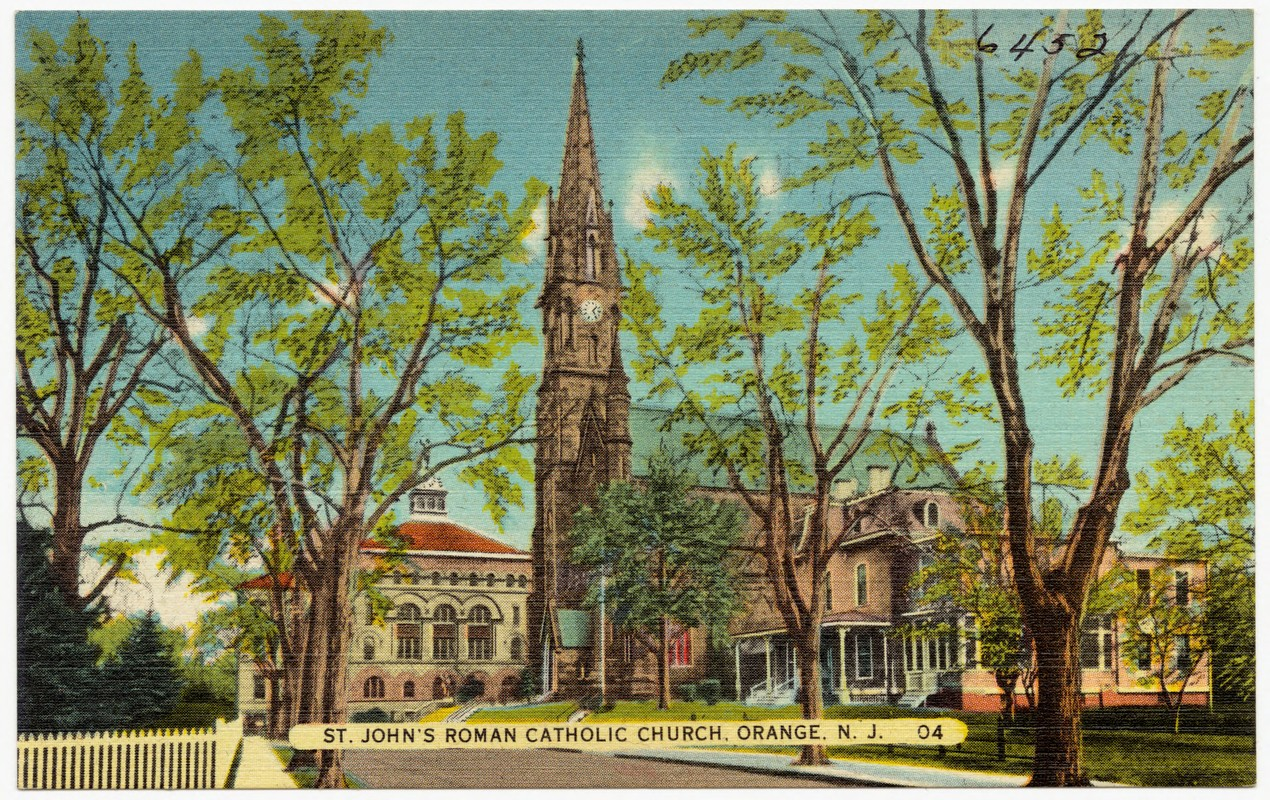
Postcard showing Columbus Hall (St. John's School) and the parish church. ca 1935.

== St. John's School ==
Columbus Hall was built to house St. John's Parish School, an institution that was founded in 1862 to serve children from kindergarten through 8th grade. It also housed a 9th grade "commercial class" for several decades. The school was staffed by the Sisters of Charity of St. Elizabeth and the De LaSalle Christian Brothers. With 19 classrooms and class sizes occasionally as large as 65, it is likely that more than 60,000 students attended classes in Columbus Hall between its dedication in 1894 and the closing of the institution on its 150th anniversary in 2012.
