= E. and G. G. Hook & Hastings =

Defunct pipe organ manufacturer in Massachusetts

E. and G. G. Hook was a pipe organ designing and manufacturing company, located in Boston, Massachusetts, which operated from 1827 to 1935. It was started, and originally run, by brothers Elias and George Greenleaf Hook.

== History ==
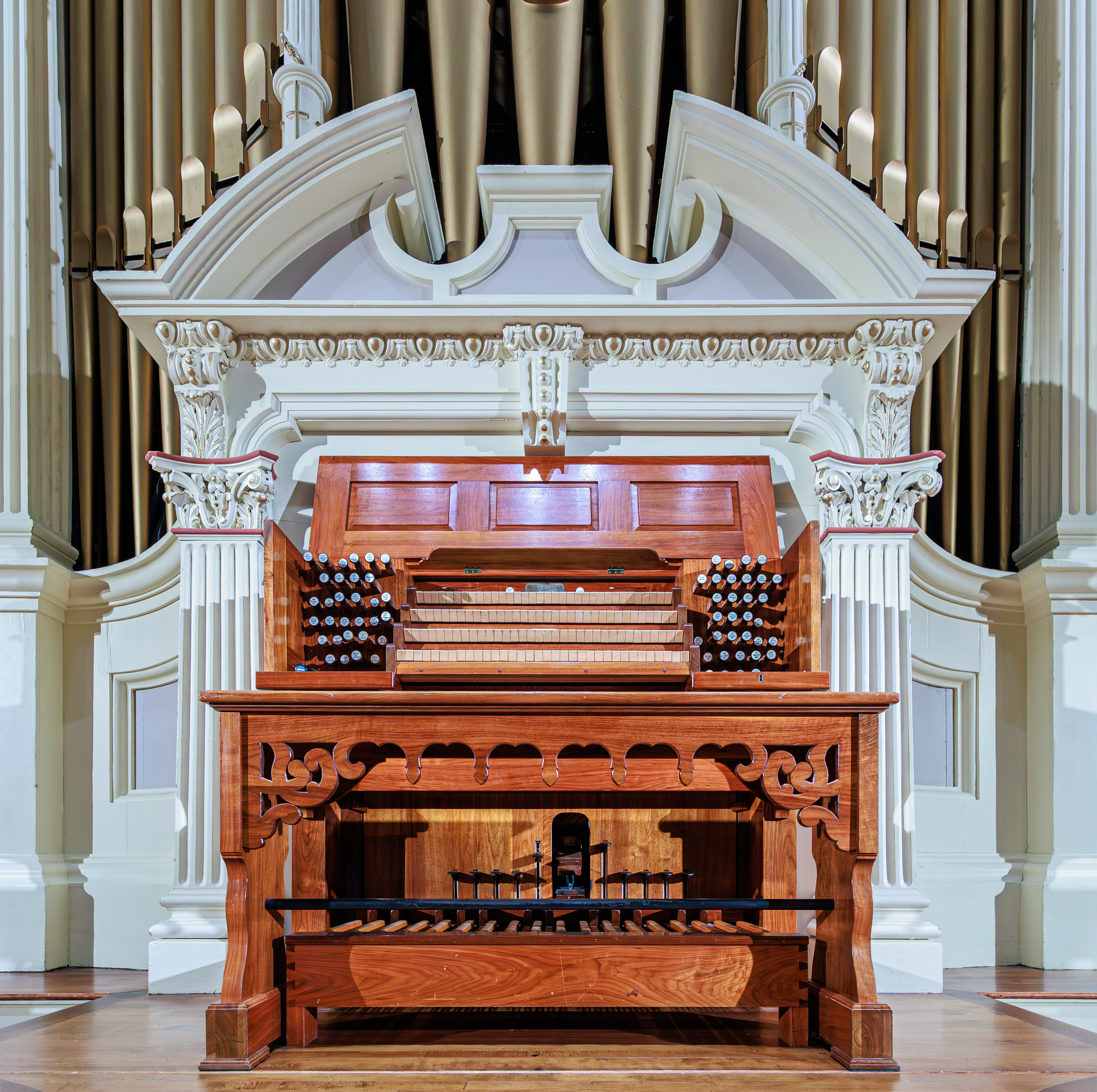
The 1864 E. & G. G. Hook organ of Mechanics Hall in Worcester, Massachusetts, the oldest unaltered four-keyboard pipe organ in the Western hemisphere located at its installation site.

The Hook brothers were sons of a cabinet maker in Salem, Massachusetts, where they apprenticed with the organ builder William Goodrich. They moved to Boston in 1832 and began producing larger organs. In 1845 they produced their first concert hall organ in the Tremont Temple in Boston which later burned. Their largest concert hall organ—indeed the "oldest unaltered four-keyboard pipe organ in the Western hemisphere located at its installation site"—was installed in 1864 at Mechanics Hall in Worcester, Massachusetts. In 1983 it was restored by the Noack Organ Company as closely to its 1864 state as possible.

When the Hook brothers were getting ready to retire, in 1871, Frank Hastings joined the firm, at which point the name was changed to E. and G. G. Hook & Hastings. When the Hook brothers retired (in 1881), the name was shortened to Hook and Hastings. In its day, Hook was the premier organ building company in the United States.

The Hook firm built over 2,000 pipe organs, many of which are still extant today. Some remain in unaltered, original condition, such as the three-manual instrument at First Unitarian Church in Jamaica Plain, Massachusetts; others have been tonally and/or physically altered due to changing trends in the organ world during the 20th century.

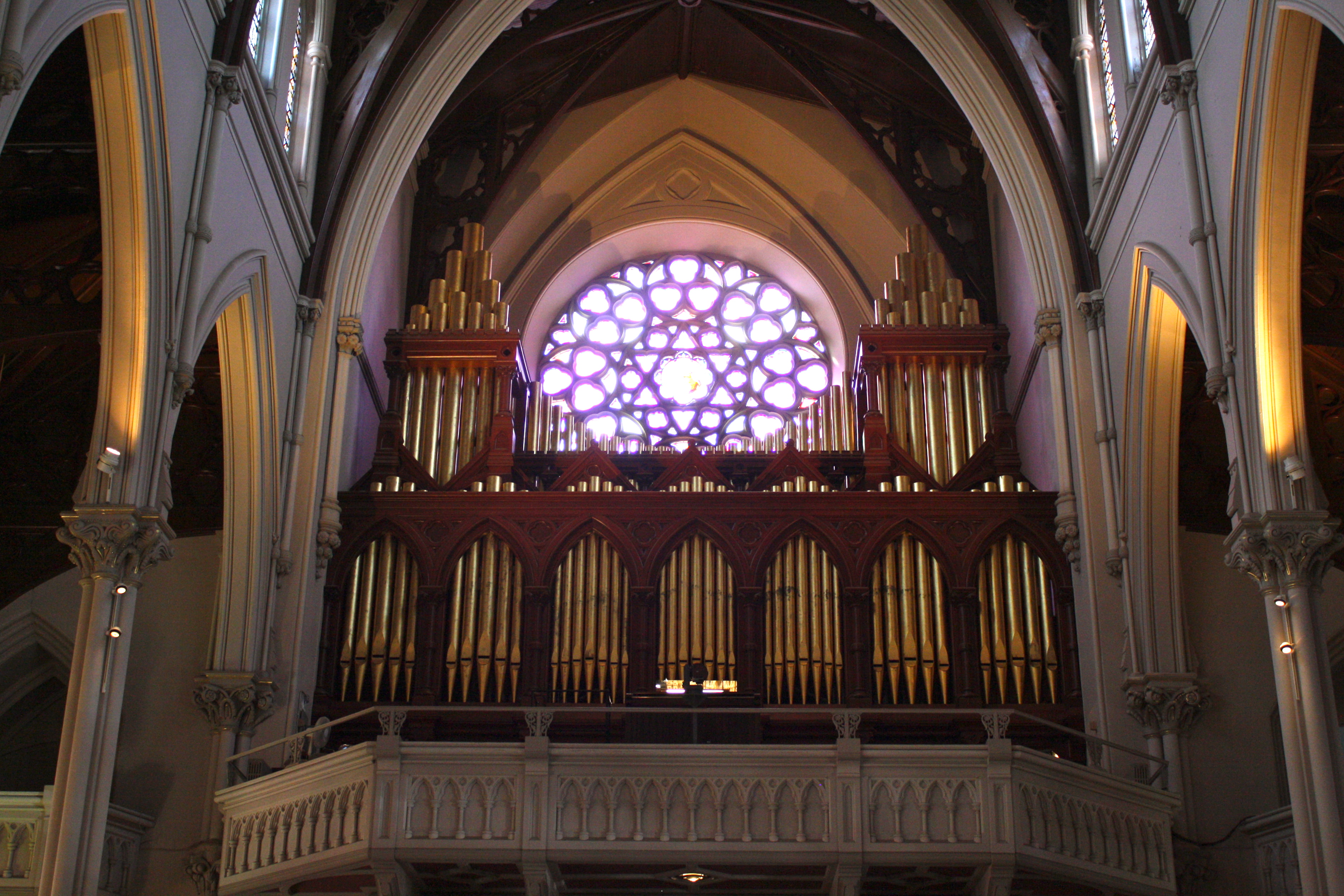
The 1875 Hook & Hastings organ of the Cathedral of the Holy Cross, Boston

The largest extant organ built by the firm is their opus 801 built in 1875 for the Cathedral of the Holy Cross in Boston, Massachusetts. This instrument comprises 101 ranks over 3 manuals and pedal. Among the more notable features of this instrument are likely a result of having to fill such a large space; namely the use of imported reeds from Zimmerman of Paris, bold mixtures, cornets and a Tuba Mirabilis made in the Hook factory. This instrument exists in a mechanically altered state having been electrified, however; it largely remains tonally original.

A Hook organ, formerly in use in the First Unitarian Church in Woburn, Massachusetts, was rebuilt in 2001 in the Heilig-Kreuz-Kirche (Holy Cross Church) in Berlin-Kreuzberg. Another of their larger instruments is in use in St. John's Church in Orange, New Jersey. The instrument was installed in 1879 at a cost of $7,000. The firm's Opus 950, it consists of 3 manuals and 2,412 pipes in 38 ranks. At the 1979 centennial of the organ, the Organ Historical Society cited the instrument as having "particular historical" merit. With the exception of an electric blower, the instrument is almost completely as originally installed.

A Complete list of organs built by E & G. G. Hook & Hastings has been published by the Organ Historical Society. Details about many of their instruments are also available in the Pipe Organ Database, operated by the Organ Historical Society. They published several editions of their "Green Book", which served as a source of general information about pipe organs as well as catalog and advertisement for their firm.
