= St. John's Church (Orange, New Jersey) =

Church in New Jersey, United States

- St. John the Evangelist Church
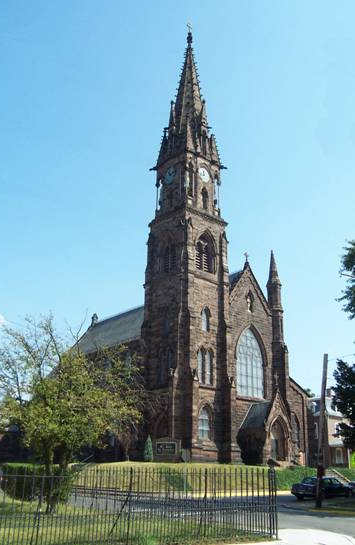
- View of the church from the west
- St. John's Church
- 40°46′36″N 74°13′57″W
- Location: Orange, New Jersey
- Country: United States
- Denomination: Roman Catholic
- Website: St. John's Church, Orange

History
- Dedication: October 10, 1869

Architecture
- Functional status: Active
- Architect: Jeremiah O'Rourke
- Style: Neo-Gothic

Specifications
- Length: 180 feet (55 m)
- Width: 68 feet (21 m)

Administration
- Archdiocese: Newark

Clergy
- Pastor: Rev. George Faour

The Church of St. John the Evangelist (commonly called St. John's Church) is a parish of the Roman Catholic Church in the City of Orange Township, Essex County, New Jersey, within the Archdiocese of Newark. It is noted for its Gothic Revival style church (building), a prominent local landmark located at 94 Ridge Street.

== History ==
=== Property ===
The land on which the present church sits was purchased in 1865 for the sum of $10,000. It is located on the highest hill west of Manhattan and east of First Watchung Mountain.

=== Construction ===
The church was designed by Jeremiah O'Rourke in the Gothic Revival style. O’Rourke was a Newark architect who specialized in church architecture. Nearby examples of his work are the chapel at Seton Hall University (1863) and the Cathedral Basilica of the Sacred Heart, Newark, New Jersey (begun in 1898). The parish school, Columbus Hall, also designed by O'Rourke, was erected in 1894 across the street from the church. O’Rourke’s design for St John’s Church is a Victorian adaptation of German Gothic architectonics.

Like many other 19th century houses of worship in the Orange Valley, the church’s exterior is faced with locally quarried brownstone. Philanthropist and real estate speculator Llewellyn S. Haskell donated the stone for St. John’s from his quarry in West Orange.

Under the direction of the pastor, Rev. Edward M. Hickey, work began on June 24, 1866. The cornerstone was blessed by James Roosevelt Bayley (first Bishop of Newark) on September 23 of that year, and the church was dedicated by Bishop Bernard John McQuaid of Newark on October 10, 1869. With its huge proportions and position on the highest hill between Manhattan and First Watchung Mountain, the building—which replaced a modest frame church that had been constructed nearby in 1851—dominated the area.

The tower and spire were completed by 1881, and included architectural features copied from the tower of the Senlis Cathedral in France. The completion of the church and provision of its internal furnishings were achieved largely due to the efforts of Rev. Hugh P. Fleming, LL.D, M.A, who was rector of the parish from 1874 to 1908.

An 1872 fire caused $7,000 damage and called attention to the extent of the debt owed by the church, which had grown to $300,000. In March 1874, when the church was to be closed to pay off the debt, Bishop Michael Corrigan of Newark ordered collections in every Catholic church in New Jersey to prevent the sale of the property (and the possible bankruptcy of the diocese). The installation of 12 electric chandeliers in 1923 is said to have been personally supervised by Thomas Edison, whose laboratories (now known as Thomas Edison National Historical Park) were located a few blocks away.

== Architectural features ==
The church, which could originally accommodate 1200 people, occupies the southeast corner of the intersection of White and Ridge Streets, Orange. The building is 180 feet (55 m) long and 68 feet (21 m) wide, and the nave is 140 feet (43 m) long.

=== Stained glass ===
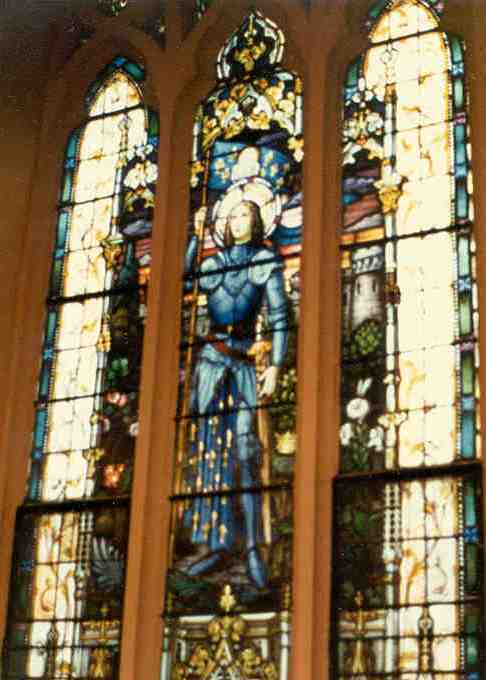
St. Joan of Arc, Zettler Studios, Munich ca 1931

The original windows, created by August Doremus in 1868, were removed in 1931. A few windows in the entry area are all that remains of these fine works of art.

In 1923, von Gerichten Art Glass of Munich installed windows above the main altar, including a large triple window (18 feet (5.5 m) high and 7 feet (2.1 m) wide) over the sanctuary and directly behind of the main altar depicting the crucifixion with an ornamental Gothic background setting. On each side of the center window are single windows with blank panels and gothic canopies, each including a representation of three roses. The windows were installed at a cost of $5,000.

Between 1930 and 1931, Zettler Studios of Munich installed windows along the aisles of the nave .

=== Altar ===
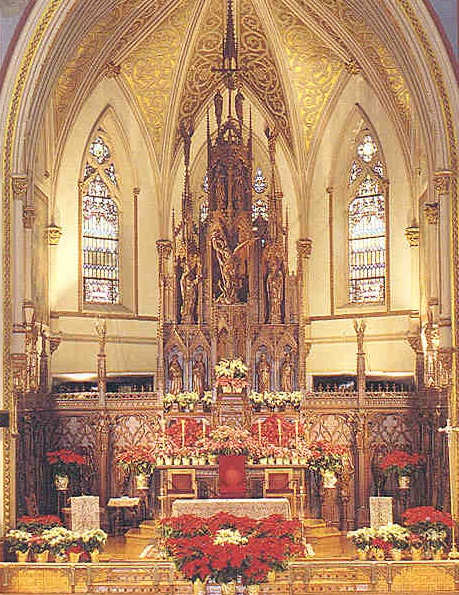
Reredos, St. John's RC Church, Orange NJ. Goyers Brothers, Louvain, Belgium, 1892

The centerpiece of the interior is the carved oak paneling and reredos of the high altar, created by the Goyers Brothers of Louvain, Belgium, in 1892. The four rear panels which flank the altar contain angel figures in high relief. Each angel carries a scroll with a phrase from the hymn "Gloria in excelsis Deo." The carved work is continued on the reredos, with the Last Supper, other sacred scenes, and figures of angels and saints carried upward to a great height. Wooden panels lining each side of the sanctuary feature high-relief statues of the twelve apostles. The reredos and sanctuary area cost $25,000.

The sanctuary parquet floor, installed in 1892, depicts inlaid vines and leaves and other floral patterns.

=== Art works ===
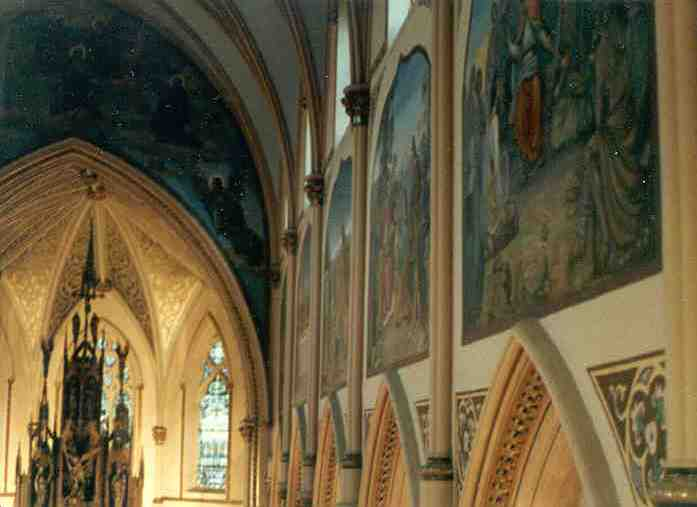
Lateral bay paintings by Lamprecht of Munich and reredos

During the 1880s, Lamprecht of Munich installed painted scenes from the life of Christ above the arches of the bays. The series of paintings continues into the sanctuary; they are in the style of the Overbeck school of art. Fourteen images of the stations of the cross, carved from wood by Italian craftsmen, were installed in 1871.

=== Spire ===
Although ground was broken in 1866, it was not until 1881 that the elaborate spire (with features copied from Senlis Cathedral, France) with protruding gargoyles and statues of the four evangelists, was added. The spire features a richly crocheted area near the top. The original height of the spire was two hundred feet (61 m). On August 1, 1922 a gilded cross, which measured seven feet (2.1 m) was installed at the top of the spire. A moving picture was made of the unusual event and was shown on screens throughout the country.

In 1881 a chime of 11 bells was installed in the tower. Three of the bells were cast in Italy and displayed at the Exposition Universelle (1878), where they had been awarded the gold medal of excellence. The remaining eight were cast by the McShane Bell Foundry of Baltimore, Maryland. The bells were solemnly blessed on November 27, 1881 by Bishop Winand Wigger of Newark. The pitch of the heaviest bell is C in the middle octave. In about 1955 the bells were fitted with an electric striking mechanism, controlled by a small keyboard located in the gallery. The keyboard range is C to D, and includes two semi-tones, F-sharp and B-flat.

In 1915 E. Howard & Co. of Boston installed a tower clock of four illuminated dials, made of bronze, each 6 feet (1.8 m) in diameter. The clock cost $5,000, and was the gift of A&P grocery chain founder and former Orange mayor George Huntington Hartford – who, in 1869, had been the first person to be baptized in St. John’s. For many decades, the clock was connected to the chime of bells so that the Westminster Quarters rang every 15 minutes and the Angelus rang at 6:00 A.M., noon, and 6:00 P.M.

== Hook & Hastings Organ ==
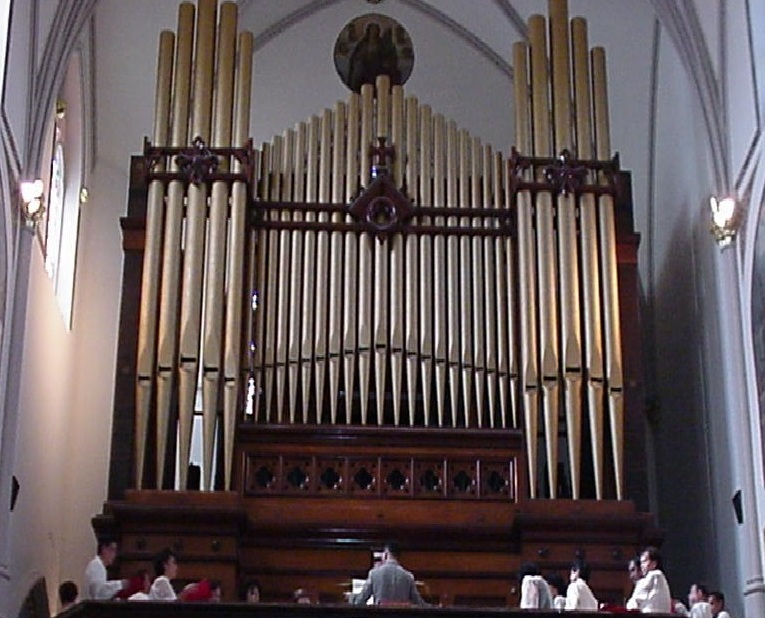
Built by E. & G. G Hook & Hastings, 1879

St. John's church features a historic pipe organ, located in the gallery. The instrument, built in 1879, is Opus 950 of E. and G. G. Hook & Hastings, a Boston organ building firm which was one of the premier organ building firms in the United States. The $7,000 contract was signed on June 9, 1879, and the organ was played for the first time on December 11, 1879. It contains 2,412 pipes in 38 ranks, with pipes ranging in length from 16 feet (4.9 m) to 0.5 inches (1.3 cm). The longest pipes, those of the Great Open Diapason 16', are visible in the facade, and the large wooden pipes of the pedal Open Diapason 16' form the side facades. At the 1979 centennial of the organ, the Organ Historical Society cited the instrument as having "particular historical" merit. This citation has only been granted to about 400 instruments since 1975. Further details about the organ are published in the database of Pipe Organs, operated by the Organ Historical Society.

=== Hartman-Beaty Restoration ===
By 1970, after nearly 100 years of almost daily use, the instrument had deteriorated and become difficult to tune or play. The Hartman-Beaty Organ Company of Englewood, New Jersey, was awarded the contract to clean and renovate all of the pipework as well as the chests and wind systems. The first and most essential part of the restoration project was to re-leather the wind reservoirs, and then restore the Great, Choir, Swell, and Pedal divisions. No re-voicing was done. With the renovation completed in 1972, the instrument was featured at a recital on June 27, 1973, during the 18th Annual Convention of the Organ Historical Society.

== Various events held in the church ==
On several occasions, world-famous Metropolitan Opera stars Enrico Caruso and Geraldine Farrar were guest soloists at the church.
