= Orange Valley Social Institute =

1897 American settlement house in New Jersey

- Orange Valley Social Institute
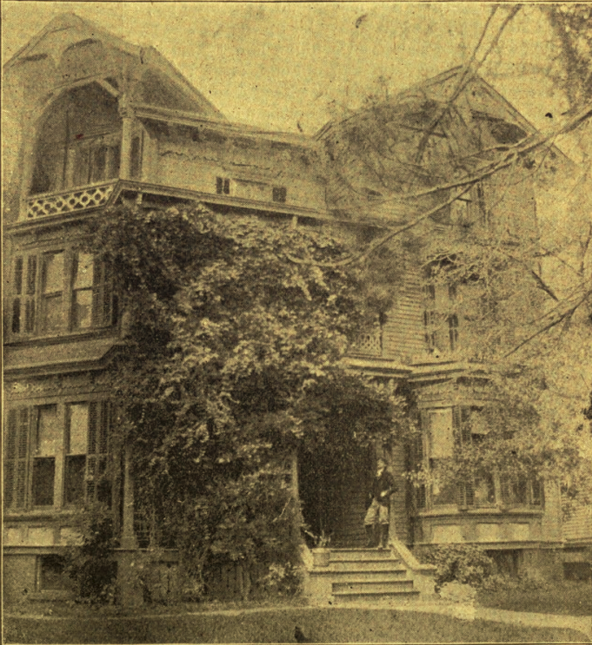
- 1897
- Formation: April 1, 1897
- Founded at: No. 35 Tompkins street, Orange Valley, New Jersey
- Coordinates: 40.76807°N 74.24595°W
- Region served: The Oranges
- Services: social reform
- Head resident: Bryant Venable, 1897-1898; Charles H. Warner, 1898–1901; Arthur Cleveland Hall, 1901-1903; Adelaide Crommelin, 1903-?

Orange Valley Social Institute (also known as Orange Valley Social Settlement) was an American settlement house established during the settlement movement era to provide educational and social opportunities for the people of the neighborhood. It was located close to Newark in The Oranges' hatting district at No. 35 Tompkins street, Orange Valley, New Jersey. Opened April 1, 1897, under the auspices of a committee of citizens of Orange, New Jersey, it was later governed by a Board of Directors of the Settlement Association. It was maintained by private contributions. Head residents included Bryant Venable, The settlement contained a kindergarten, boys' games club, basket weaving club, shuffleboard club, mothers' meetings, chair caning club, bowling club and a library. In the first nine months of 1902, 497 persons borrowed 3,568 books, while there was an average daily attendance of about 30 at the reading rooms.

== Neighborhood ==
Orange Valley included the manufacturing district of the Oranges. In it were ten large hat and box factories, around which were gathered a dense population of operatives. The crowded conditions of the homes and the small incomes of the workers made it impossible for these people to provide for themselves the recreative and social surroundings that are both pleasant and profitable. The saloon took advantage of the situation, and as a result, there was much intemperance and consequent poverty of home comforts. Differing from most other settlements, the Orange Valley Social Institute was unique in being located in a rural community, yet having the perplexing problems of city settlements. People in the district included Americans, Irish, Poles, Germans, and Italians.

== Establishment ==
It was the successor of a few other efforts toward social amelioration, with the recognition in New Jersey of the need of some work toward social unification. It was located in the heart of the manufacturing district of Orange, New Jersey. Numerous efforts had previously been made toward organization for social, intellectual and moral betterment of the Orange Valley, but they had all proved at best only partially effective, and for the most part short-lived. There had been a YMCA, a Young Men's Catholic Lyceum, a parish club of the Episcopal Church, a girls' club, a boys' club, and numberless other works of various kinds, but on the one hand there had been a lack of sufficient catholicity of spirit in these works when conducted under denominational or sectarian auspices; on the other hand there was frequently absence of the firmness and consistency of management necessary for permanency. It was in this condition of affairs that the social settlement idea commended itself to a number of men having the welfare of the community at heart and Bryant Venable, of the Cincinnati settlement and the University of Cincinnati, was secured as headworker. He came to the work April 1, 1897, and at once began the planning. A commodious building was secured, and on the 30th of April was ready for occupancy.

The people entered at once into the spirit of the thing. The large majority of the 5,000 people in the Valley were more or less dependent upon the hat factories for employment and livelihood. Among the hat workers is the settlement's field. Before the house was opened, the people were given to understand that it was to be their own "community house," and that its success would be commensurate with their interest in it. As a result, the house was thrown open, not by the board of directors or by subscribers to the treasury, but by the men and women of the Valley. A few of them got together, made all the arrangements for the house-warming, and on April 28, 1897, threw open the doors, and the house became the common property of the people.

In the first three months since the house was opened, the influence of its motive and impulse extended in many directions. Initially, Venable was the only actual resident beside the caretaker and the housekeeper, but several residents were expected by autumn.

== Activities ==
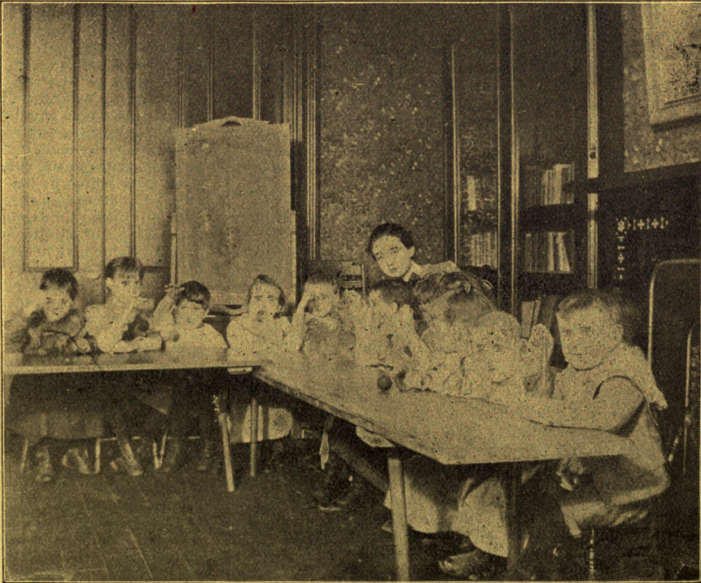
Kindergarten

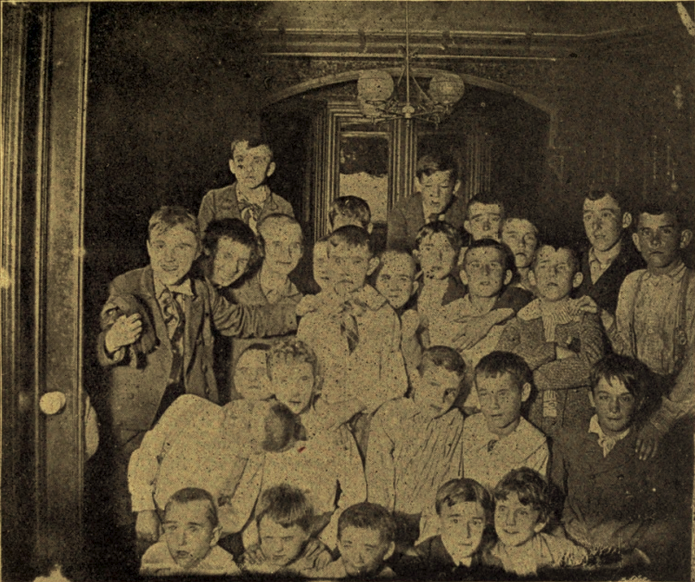
Johnnie Club

The girls' club of Orange became identified with the settlement. There were two boys' clubs, the "Johnnie Club" and the "Tanglewood Club". There were also two adult clubs for social and intellectual benefit, as well as a young woman's literature and reading class, and a "Little Women Club" for mothers. The "Omnibus Club" was for older people, and met for two hours every Friday evening for a lecture or concert and social interaction. The kindergarten was under the direction of Helen Edwards, an experienced kindergartner of New York City. There was a penny provident bank, as well as two baseball teams.

By 1911, the settlement kindergarten had been taken over by the board of education. The house had been of service in some labor difficulties. A civic club of young men interested themselves in the problems of the neighborhood. The settlement organized Orange Valley Civic League (1897), which bettered the conditions of streets, suppressed gambling in public places, and was instrumental in securing a hospital for contagious diseases. It continued to maintain a public library; penny provident bank with stations in the public schools; classes in kitchen garden; sewing; boys' and girls' gymnastic work; Italian lace work for older women; dramatic club, folk dancing; socials; lectures; and a mothers' meeting.

== Notable people ==
Head residents included Bryant Venable, 1897-1898; Charles H. Warner, 1898–1901; Arthur Cleveland Hall, 1901-1903; Adelaide Crommelin, 1903-?.

== See also ==
- Settlement and community houses in the United States
