= Orange, New Jersey =

City in Essex County, New Jersey, US

- Township
- City of Orange Township
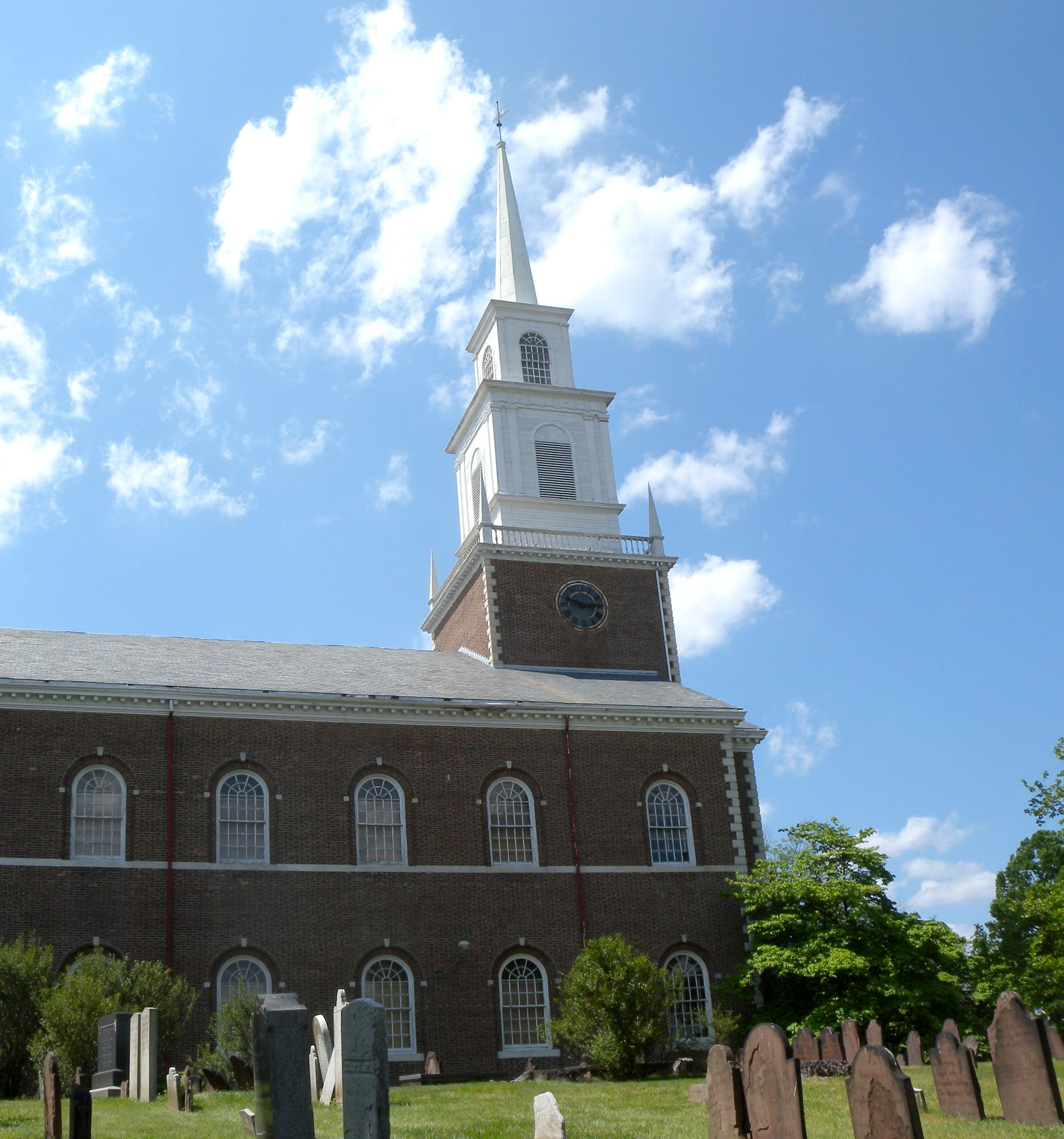
- The former First Presbyterian Church

- Seal
- Interactive map of Orange, New Jersey
- Location in Essex County Location in New Jersey Location in the United States
- Coordinates: 40.76804°N 74.235692°W
- Country: United States
- State: New Jersey
- County: Essex
- Incorporated: November 27, 1806 (as township)
- Reincorporated: April 3, 1872 (as city)

Government
  - Type: Faulkner Act Mayor-Council
  - Body: City Council
  - Mayor: Dwayne D. Warren (term ends June 30, 2028)
  - Administrator: Christopher Hartwyk
  - Deputy Clerk: Joyce L. Lanier

Area
  - Total: 2.22 sq mi (5.74 km^{2})
  - Land: 2.21 sq mi (5.73 km^{2})
  - Water: 0.0039 sq mi (0.01 km^{2}) 0.09%
  - Rank: 392nd of 565 in state 19th of 22 in county
- Elevation: 197 ft (60 m)

Population (2020)
  - Total: 34,447
  - Estimate (2024): 35,079
  - Rank: 69th of 565 in state 8th of 22 in county
  - Density: 15,565.7/sq mi (6,010.0/km^{2})
  - Rank: 17th of 565 in state 3rd of 22 in county
- Time zone: UTC−05:00 (Eastern (EST))
  - Summer (DST): UTC−04:00 (Eastern (EDT))
- ZIP Codes: 07050–07051
- Area code: 973
- FIPS code: 3401313045
- GNIS feature ID: 1729742
- Website: orangenj.gov

The City of Orange (known simply as Orange) is a township in Essex County, in the U.S. state of New Jersey. As of the 2020 United States census, the township's population was 34,447, an increase of 4,313 (+14.3%) from the 2010 census count of 30,134, which in turn reflected a decline of 2,734 (-8.3%) from the 32,868 counted in the 2000 census.

The New Jersey Legislature originally incorporated Orange as a township on November 27, 1806, from parts of what was then Newark Township. Parts of the township were taken on April 14, 1834, to form the now-defunct Clinton Township. On January 31, 1860, Orange was reincorporated as a town. Parts of the town were taken to form South Orange Township (April 1, 1861, now known as Maplewood), Fairmount (March 11, 1862, since a part of West Orange), East Orange (March 4, 1863) and West Orange (April 10, 1863). On April 3, 1872, Orange was reincorporated as a city. In 1982, the city was one of four Essex County municipalities to pass a referendum to become a township, joining 11 municipalities that had already made the change, of what ultimately were more than a dozen Essex County municipalities to reclassify themselves as townships to take advantage of federal revenue sharing policies that allocated townships a greater share of government aid to municipalities on a per capita basis. The city derives its name from William III of England or William IV, Prince of Orange.

Despite the differences in the municipalities' character, Orange, East Orange, South Orange and West Orange are sometimes jointly called The Oranges.

In 2020, the township had New Jersey's 12th-highest property tax rate, with an equalized rate of 4.679% compared to 2.824% in the county as a whole and a statewide average of 2.279%.

== History ==
Orange has its origins in Connecticut's New Haven Colony. In 1666, 30 of New Haven's families traveled by water to found "a town on the Passayak" River. They arrived on territory now encompassing Newark, the Oranges, and several other municipalities. The area was in the northeast portion of a land grant conveyed by King Charles II of England to his brother James, Duke of York. In 1664, James conveyed the land to two proprietors, Lord John Berkeley and Sir George Carteret. Since Carteret had been Royal Governor of the Isle of Jersey, the territory became known as "New Jersey."

Orange was initially part of the city of Newark, but it was originally known as "Newark Mountains". On June 7, 1780, the townspeople of Newark Mountains officially voted to adopt the name Orange. At the time, a significant number of people favored secession from Newark. This did not occur until November 27, 1806, when the territory now encompassing all of the Oranges was finally detached.

On April 13, 1807, the first government was elected, but not until March 13, 1860, was Orange officially incorporated as a city. Immediately, the new city began fragmenting into smaller communities, primarily because of local disputes about the costs of establishing paid police, fire, and street departments. South Orange was organized on January 26, 1861; Fairmount (later to become part of West Orange) on March 11, 1862; East Orange on March 4, 1863; and West Orange (including Fairmount) on March 14, 1863.

=== Early center of transportation ===
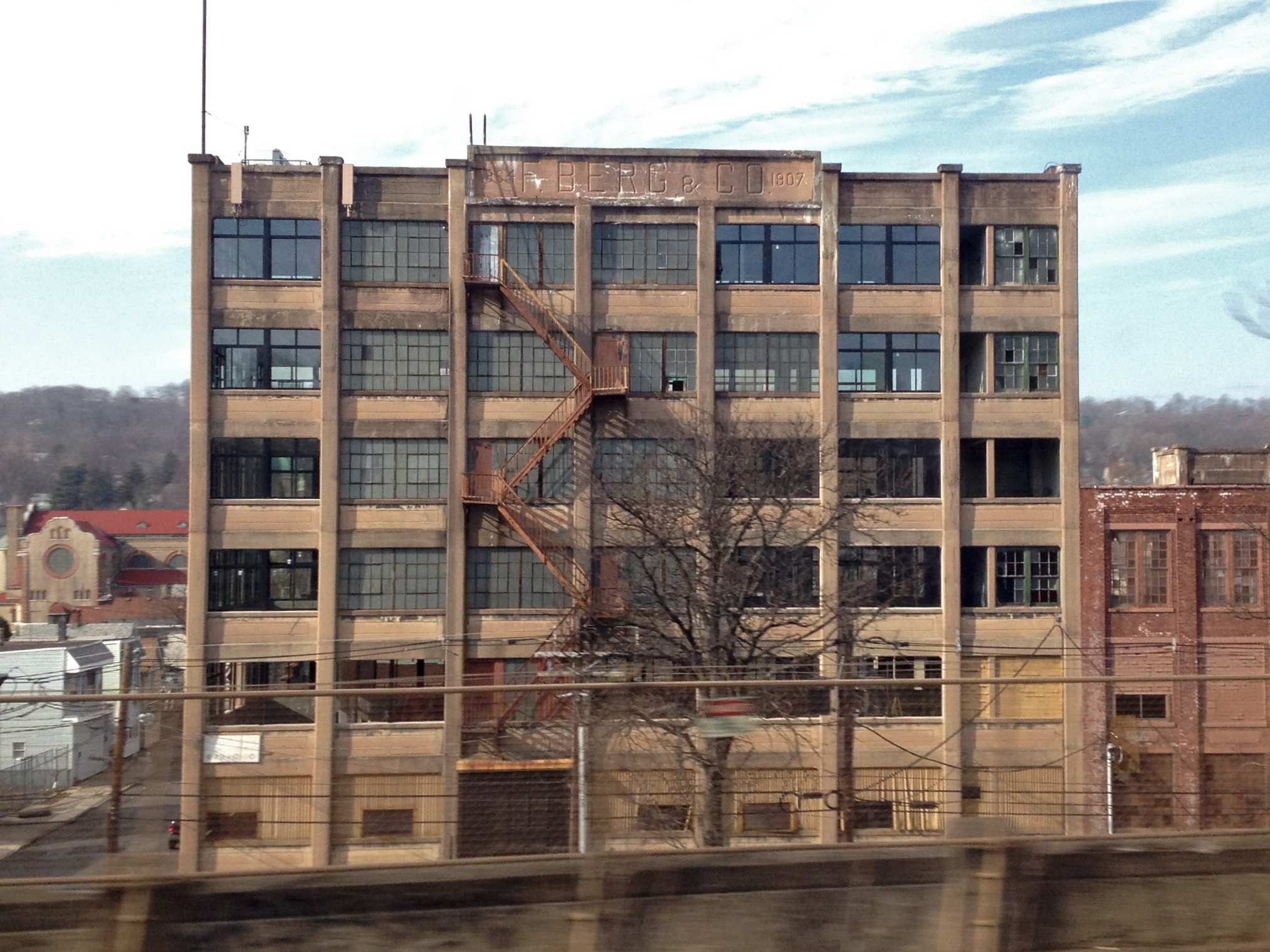
F. Berg & Co. hat factory building, built in 1907. The company left in the 1920s.

Orange is on the Newark and Mount-Pleasant Turnpike, the main road from Newark to Morristown, and ultimately to Easton, Pennsylvania. The town became a busy thoroughfare for travelers, and hotels abounded. Initially, the stagecoach was the primary method of transportation. Omnibuses of the Eclipse and the Morris & Newark Lines serviced Orange.

The Morris and Essex Railroad arrived in Orange in November 1836, its first cars drawn by horses. On October 2, 1837, the first steam locomotive appeared, and the horses were, with minor exception, relegated to pasture. The "M&E" later became a part of the Delaware, Lackawanna and Western Railroad (DL&W), which exists today as NJ Transit's Morristown Line.

Trolley cars appeared much later, with the Orange and Newark Horse Car Railroad Company running its first car up Main Street in May 1862. The Orange Crosstown Line, eventually extending from Morris Street, Orange, to Bloomfield, was started in June 1888. (The first electric trolley in the State of New Jersey operated over a section of this line.) Eventually, all the trolleys, and the buses that replaced them, became part of the sprawling Public Service Coordinated Transport System.

Orange became an industrial city early in its history, with the tanning industry expanding rapidly after settlers found growths of hemlock trees that were a source for the tannic acid they needed, leading to the growth of many factories producing shoes and boots.

Orange was once the United States' hat-making capital. The industry can be traced there to 1792. By 1892, 21 firms were engaged in that trade, employing more than 3,700 people in plants that produced about 4.8 million hats, which had a combined value in excess of $1 million (equivalent to $35.8 million in 2025). A group of brothers founded the "No-Name Hat Company" in Orange before one of them moved on to make fedoras in Philadelphia under the family name "Stetson." By 1921, only five hat-making firms were left, many having departed for places such as Norwalk and Danbury, Connecticut. By 1960, all had left.

Beer was a major industry in Orange beginning in the early 1900s, when the three Winter Brothers of Pittsburgh, Pennsylvania, arrived in the city and built the first brewery. The Orange Brewery was constructed in 1901 at a reported cost of $350,000 (equivalent to $13.5 million in 2025). The production of beer ceased with prohibition in 1920, and after the repeal of the Volstead Act in 1933, the brewery was sold to John F. Trommers of Philadelphia. Trommers brewed beer under that label until 1950, when the concern was again sold to Liebmann Breweries, Incorporated, which bottled Rheingold Beer. Eventually, after passing through several other owners, the plant was closed permanently in 1977.

Other notable firms in Orange were the Monroe Calculating Company, manufacturers of the adding machines of the same name, and the Bates Manufacturing Company, producers of office accessories such as staplers and stampers.

From about 1917 to 1926, the United States Radium Corporation refined ore and extracted the radium used to make luminous paint for dials and hands of watches and other indicators. Years later, the carcinogenic effects of this material became known, and the polluted site of the factory became a liability for the city. The Radium Girls were a group of hundreds of female factory workers who contracted acute radiation syndrome after ingesting radioactive radium when they followed instructions to rub brushes on their lips that were being used to paint luminescent watch dials, many of them suffering cancers and other deformities due to the radiation poisoning. The company's facility at 422–432 Alden Street was added to the National Park Service's Historic American Buildings Survey in 1999.

=== Notable residents and visitors ===
Orange has produced such notables as baseball's Monte Irvin and heavyweight boxer Tony Galento. Actor William Bendix lived and worked here for a short while. Presidents, presidential candidates, and governors visited. Orange held major celebrations for its 100th anniversary, and another when it turned 150.

=== Late 20th century political and social changes ===
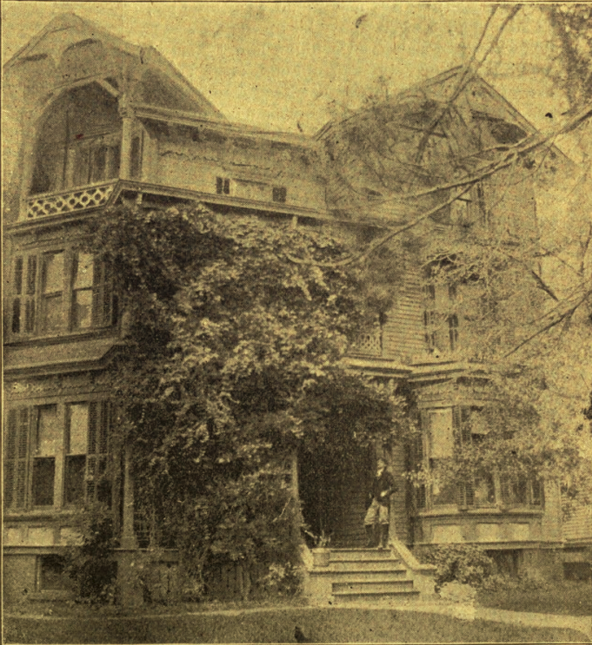
Orange Valley Social Institute (1897)

Once a multi-ethnic, economically diverse city, Orange suffered indirectly from the 1967 riots in Newark (even though Newark and Orange do not share a border) and directly from the construction of Interstate 280 through the heart of the downtown area, triggering middle-class "white flight" from aging industrial towns to the new automobile suburbs being built in western Essex County and elsewhere. By the end of the 1970s, Orange had many of the urban ills normally associated with larger cities. However, the city still features many tree-lined streets with well-maintained homes.

In 1982, citizens voted overwhelmingly to change the designation of Orange from a city to a township, thereby making it eligible for federal Revenue Sharing funds. In 1985, the State of New Jersey named Orange as a State Urban Enterprise Zone, creating tax breaks and investment incentives.

== Geography ==
According to the United States Census Bureau, the township had a total area of 2.22 square miles (5.74 km^{2}), including 2.21 square miles (5.73 km^{2}) of land and <0.01 square miles (0.01 km^{2}) of water (0.09%).

The East Branch of the Rahway River travels through Orange.

Orange borders the Essex County municipalities of East Orange, Glen Ridge, Montclair, South Orange and West Orange.

== Demographics ==
Historical population
Census	Pop.	Note	%±
1810	2,266		—
1820	2,830		24.9%
1830	3,887		37.3%
1840	3,264	*	−16.0%
1850	4,385		34.3%
1860	8,877		102.4%
1870	9,348	*	5.3%
1880	13,207		41.3%
1890	18,844		42.7%
1900	24,141		28.1%
1910	29,630		22.7%
1920	33,268		12.3%
1930	35,399		6.4%
1940	35,717		0.9%
1950	38,037		6.5%
1960	35,789		−5.9%
1970	32,566		−9.0%
1980	31,136		−4.4%
1990	29,925		−3.9%
2000	32,868		9.8%
2010	30,134		−8.3%
2020	34,447		14.3%
2024 (est.)	35,079		1.8%
Population sources: 1810–1920; 1840–1900 1840 1850–1870; 1850 1870 1880–1890; 1890–1910 1860–1930; 1940–2000 2000; 2010 2020 * = Lost territory in previous decade.

=== 2020 census ===
City of Orange township; Essex County, New Jersey – Racial and ethnic composition Note: the US Census treats Hispanic/Latino as an ethnic category. This table excludes Latinos from the racial categories and assigns them to a separate category. Hispanics/Latinos may be of any race.
Race / Ethnicity (NH = Non-Hispanic)	Pop 2000	Pop 2010	Pop 2020	% 2000	% 2010	% 2020
White alone (NH)	2,502	1,357	1,073	7.61%	4.50%	3.11%
Black or African American alone (NH)	24,318	21,067	21,627	73.99%	69.91%	62.78%
Native American or Alaska Native alone (NH)	79	114	44	0.24%	0.38%	0.13%
Asian alone (NH)	414	448	262	1.26%	1.49%	0.76%
Pacific Islander alone (NH)	17	3	7	0.05%	0.01%	0.02%
Some Other Race alone (NH)	168	169	303	0.51%	0.56%	0.88%
Mixed Race or Multi-Racial (NH)	1,273	445	1,148	3.87%	1.48%	3.33%
Hispanic or Latino (any race)	4,097	6,531	9,983	12.47%	21.67%	28.98%
Total	32,868	30,134	34,447	100.00%	100.00%	100.00%

=== 2010 census ===
The 2010 United States census counted 30,134 people, 11,202 households, and 6,878 families in the township. The population density was 13,705.7 per square mile (5,291.8/km^{2}). There were 12,222 housing units at an average density of 5,558.9 per square mile (2,146.3/km^{2}). The racial makeup was 12.80% (3,857) White, 71.83% (21,645) Black or African American, 0.57% (173) Native American, 1.51% (455) Asian, 0.02% (6) Pacific Islander, 9.95% (2,999) from other races, and 3.32% (999) from two or more races. Hispanic or Latino of any race were 21.67% (6,531) of the population.

Of the 11,202 households, 31.0% had children under the age of 18; 28.6% were married couples living together; 24.6% had a female householder with no husband present and 38.6% were non-families. Of all households, 32.7% were made up of individuals and 11.4% had someone living alone who was 65 years of age or older. The average household size was 2.66 and the average family size was 3.38.

25.0% of the population were under the age of 18, 9.8% from 18 to 24, 30.5% from 25 to 44, 23.6% from 45 to 64, and 11.2% who were 65 years of age or older. The median age was 34.4 years. For every 100 females, the population had 89.0 males. For every 100 females ages 18 and older there were 84.1 males.

The Census Bureau's 2006–2010 American Community Survey showed that (in 2010 inflation-adjusted dollars) median household income was $40,818 (with a margin of error of +/− $1,616) and the median family income was $44,645 (+/− $4,033). Males had a median income of $34,986 (+/− $3,168) versus $36,210 (+/− $2,706) for females. The per capita income for the borough was $19,816 (+/− $1,027). About 16.2% of families and 18.1% of the population were below the poverty line, including 24.6% of those under age 18 and 20.6% of those age 65 or over.

=== 2000 census ===
As of the 2000 United States census there were 32,868 people, 11,885 households, and 7,642 families residing in the township. The population density was 14,903.7 inhabitants per square mile (5,754.4/km^{2}). There were 12,665 housing units at an average density of 5,742.8 per square mile (2,217.3/km^{2}). The racial makeup of the township was 13.20% White, 75.10% Black or African American, 0.34% Native American, 1.26% Asian, 0.10% Pacific Islander, 5.21% from other races, and 4.79% from two or more races. Hispanic or Latino of any race were 12.47% of the population.

There were 11,885 households, out of which 33.4% had children under the age of 18 living with them, 30.7% were married couples living together, 26.3% had a female householder with no husband present, and 35.7% were non-families. 30.2% of all households were made up of individuals, and 10.5% had someone living alone who was 65 years of age or older. The average household size was 2.73 and the average family size was 3.38.

In the township the population was spread out, with 27.7% under the age of 18, 10.0% from 18 to 24, 32.2% from 25 to 44, 19.3% from 45 to 64, and 10.8% who were 65 years of age or older. The median age was 32 years. For every 100 females, there were 86.0 males. For every 100 females age 18 and over, there were 79.1 males.

The median income for a household in the township was $35,759, and the median income for a family was $40,852. Males had a median income of $33,442 versus $29,520 for females. The per capita income for the CDP was $16,861. About 15.4% of families and 18.8% of the population were below the poverty line, including 24.6% of those under age 18 and 16.7% of those age 65 or over.

As part of the 2000 Census, 75.10% of Orange's residents identified themselves as being African American, one of the highest percentages of African American people in the United States, and the fourth-highest in New Jersey (behind Lawnside at 93.60%, East Orange at 89.46%, and Irvington at 81.66%) of all places with 1,000 or more residents identifying their ancestry.

Orange has a large Haitian American population, with 11.4% of residents identifying themselves as being of Haitian ancestry, the highest of any municipality in New Jersey and the eighth-highest in the United States.

Although still a small percentage of total residents, Orange and East Orange have the largest concentrations of Guyanese Americans in the country. In the 2000 Census, 2.9% of Orange residents identified as being of Guyanese ancestry. While Queens and Brooklyn had larger populations in terms of raw numbers, Orange and East Orange (with 2.5%) had the highest percentages of people of Guyanese ancestry as a portion of the total population of all places in the United States.

== Government ==
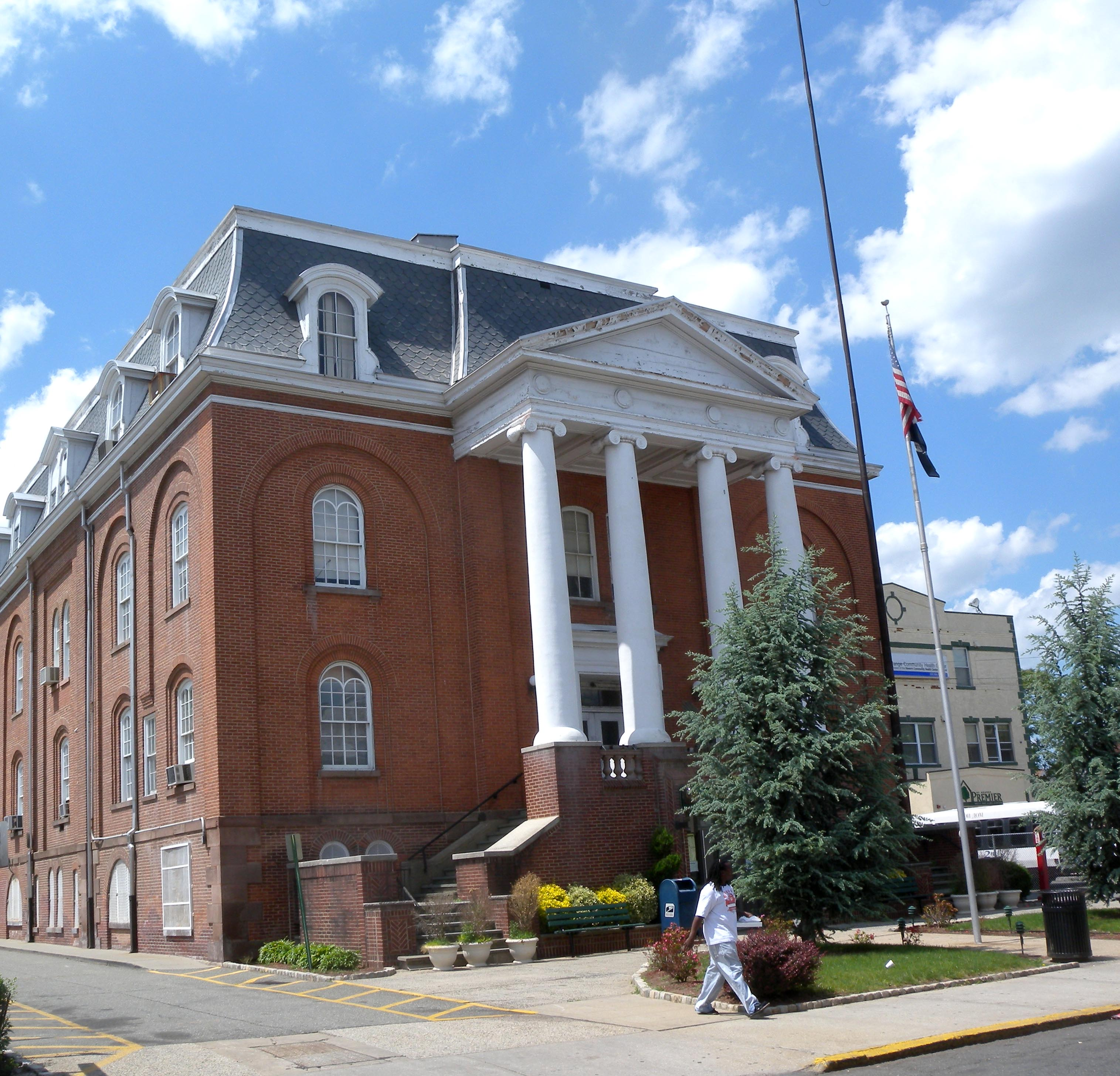
Municipal Building

=== Local government ===
Orange is governed within the Faulkner Act, formally known as the Optional Municipal Charter Law, under the Mayor-Council form of municipal government. The city is one of 71 (of the 564) municipalities statewide that use this form of government. The governing body is comprised of the directly elected mayor and the seven-member City Council. There are four ward representatives on the city council and three at-large representatives. Councilmembers are elected to serve four-year terms of office in non-partisan elections on a staggered basis with the three at-large seats and the mayor up for election together and two years later the four ward seats up at the same time in an alternating cycle in even-numbered years as part of the May municipal election.

As of 2025, the Mayor of Orange is Dwayne D. Warren, whose term of office ends June 30, 2024. Members of the City Council are Council President Adrienne Wooten (at-large, 2028), Council Vice President Tency A. Eason (North Ward, 2026), Kerry J. Coley (East Ward, 2026), Quantavia L. Hilbert (West Ward, 2026), Weldon M. Montague III (at-large, 2028), Clifford Ross (at-large, 2029) and Jamie Summers-Johnson (South Ward, 2026).

=== Federal, state and county representation ===
The City of Orange Township is in the 10th Congressional District and New Jersey's 34th state legislative district.

For the 119th United States Congress, New Jersey's 10th congressional district is represented by LaMonica McIver (D, Newark). New Jersey is represented in the United States Senate by Democrats Cory Booker (Newark, term ends 2027) and Andy Kim (Moorestown, term ends 2031).

For the 2026–2027 session, the 34th legislative district of the New Jersey Legislature is represented in the State Senate by Britnee Timberlake (D, East Orange) and in the General Assembly by Carmen Morales (D, Belleville) and Michael Venezia (D, Bloomfield).

Essex County is governed by a directly elected county executive, with legislative functions performed by the Board of County Commissioners. As of 2025, the County Executive is Joseph N. DiVincenzo Jr. (D, Roseland), whose four-year term of office ends December 31, 2026. The county's Board of County Commissioners is composed of nine members, five of whom are elected from districts and four of whom are elected on an at-large basis. They are elected for three-year concurrent terms and may be re-elected to successive terms at the annual election in November. Essex County's Commissioners are:

Robert Mercado (D, District 1 – Newark's North and East Wards, parts of Central and West Wards; Newark, 2026), A'Dorian Murray-Thomas (D, District 2 – Irvington, Maplewood and parts of Newark's South and West Wards; Newark, 2026), Vice President Tyshammie L. Cooper (D, District 3 - Newark: West and Central Wards; East Orange, Orange and South Orange; East Orange, 2026), Leonard M. Luciano (D, District 4 – Caldwell, Cedar Grove, Essex Fells, Fairfield, Livingston, Millburn, North Caldwell, Roseland, Verona, West Caldwell and West Orange; West Caldwell, 2026), President Carlos M. Pomares (D, District 5 – Belleville, Bloomfield, Glen Ridge, Montclair and Nutley; Bloomfield, 2026), Brendan W. Gill (D, at large; Montclair, 2026), Romaine Graham (D, at large; Irvington, 2026), Wayne Richardson (D, at large; Newark, 2026), Patricia Sebold (D, at-large; Livingston, 2026).

Constitutional officers elected countywide are: Clerk Christopher J. Durkin (D, West Caldwell, 2025), Register of Deeds Juan M. Rivera Jr. (D, Newark, 2029), Sheriff Amir Jones (D, Newark, 2027), and Surrogate Alturrick Kenney (D, Newark, 2028).

=== Politics ===
As of March 2011, there were 14,943 registered voters in Orange, of whom 8,490 (56.8%) were registered as Democrats, 302 (2.0%) as Republicans, and 6,147 (41.1%) as Unaffiliated. There were no voters registered as either Libertarian or as affiliated with the Green Party.

United States presidential election results for Orange
Year	Republican		Democratic		Third party(ies)	
Year	No.	%	No.	%	No.	%
2024	1,076	11.32%	8,319	87.54%	108	1.14%
2020	642	6.00%	10,001	93.51%	52	0.49%
2016	421	4.27%	9,298	94.25%	146	1.48%
2012	291	2.86%	9,828	96.72%	42	0.41%
2008	397	3.81%	10,001	95.93%	27	0.26%
2004	811	9.13%	8,000	90.11%	67	0.75%

In the 2024 presidential election, Republican Donald Trump was the only Republican, since at least 2004, to obtain over 10.0% of the vote in Orange at 11.3%, as well as the most votes since at least the same year a 1,076 votes. At the same time, Democrat Kamala Harris, although still winning the city by a wide margin, was the only Democrat to obtain under 90.0% percent of the vote since at least 2004 with 87.5%. All of this was in correspondence with the rightward shift of Orange from the 2016 to 2020 presidential elections, as well as New Jersey and the nation as a whole from the 2020 to 2024 presidential elections.

Gubernatorial election results for Orange
Year	Republican		Democratic		Third party(ies)	
Year	No.	%	No.	%	No.	%
2025	428	5.94%	6,742	93.64%	30	0.42%
2021	259	5.34%	4,568	94.22%	21	0.43%
2017	185	3.63%	4,788	94.03%	119	2.34%
2013	643	14.36%	3,809	85.04%	27	0.60%
2009	302	5.59%	4,993	92.46%	105	1.94%
2005	348	7.41%	4,266	90.79%	85	1.81%

In the 2013 gubernatorial election, Democrat Barbara Buono received 85.0% of the vote (3,809 cast), ahead of Republican Chris Christie with 14.4% (643 votes), and other candidates with 0.6% (27 votes), among the 4,560 ballots cast by the township's 16,607 registered voters (81 ballots were spoiled), for a turnout of 27.5%. In the 2009 gubernatorial election, Democrat Jon Corzine received 91.7% of the vote (4,993 ballots cast), ahead of Republican Chris Christie with 5.5% (302 votes), Independent Chris Daggett with 1.4% (74 votes) and other candidates with 0.6% (31 votes), among the 5,442 ballots cast by the city's 14,891 registered voters, yielding a 36.5% turnout.

United States Senate election results for Orange1
Year	Republican		Democratic		Third party(ies)	
Year	No.	%	No.	%	No.	%
2024	907	10.07%	7,869	87.34%	234	2.60%
2018	287	3.93%	6,914	94.62%	106	1.45%
2012	246	2.74%	8,635	96.30%	86	0.96%
2006	323	6.77%	4,365	91.47%	84	1.76%

United States Senate election results for Orange2
Year	Republican		Democratic		Third party(ies)	
Year	No.	%	No.	%	No.	%
2020	456	4.40%	9,767	94.20%	145	1.40%
2014	146	3.32%	4,219	96.06%	27	0.61%
2013	151	3.77%	3,826	95.51%	29	0.72%
2008	316	3.78%	7,927	94.81%	118	1.41%

== Emergency services ==
=== Fire department ===
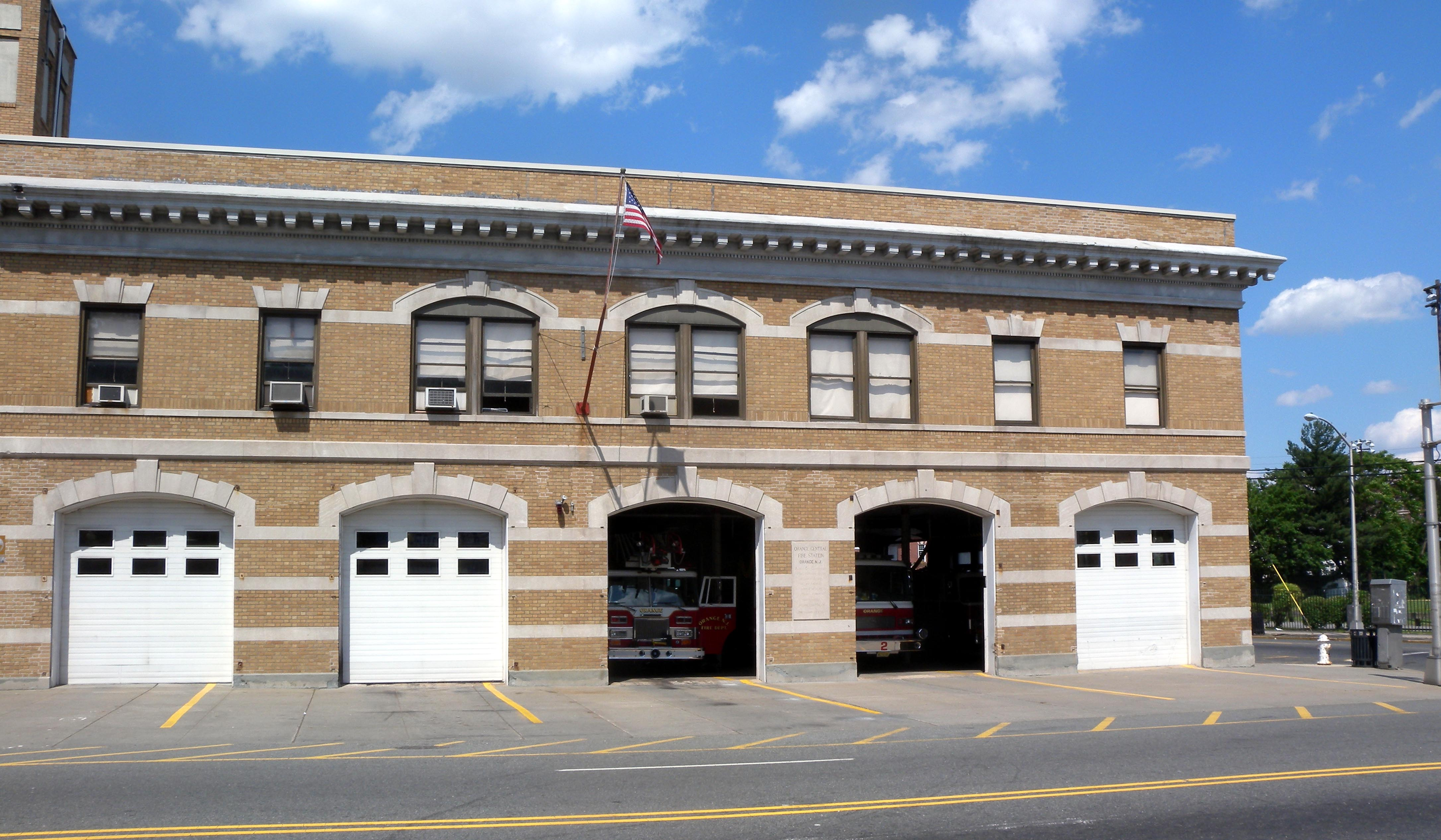
Central fire station

The City of Orange is served by the professional firefighters of the city of Orange Fire Department (OFD). Founded in 1872, the OFD operates out of two fire stations, located at 419 Central Avenue and 257 Washington Street. The firefighting apparatus consists of two fire engines, two quints and a ladder truck.

== Education ==
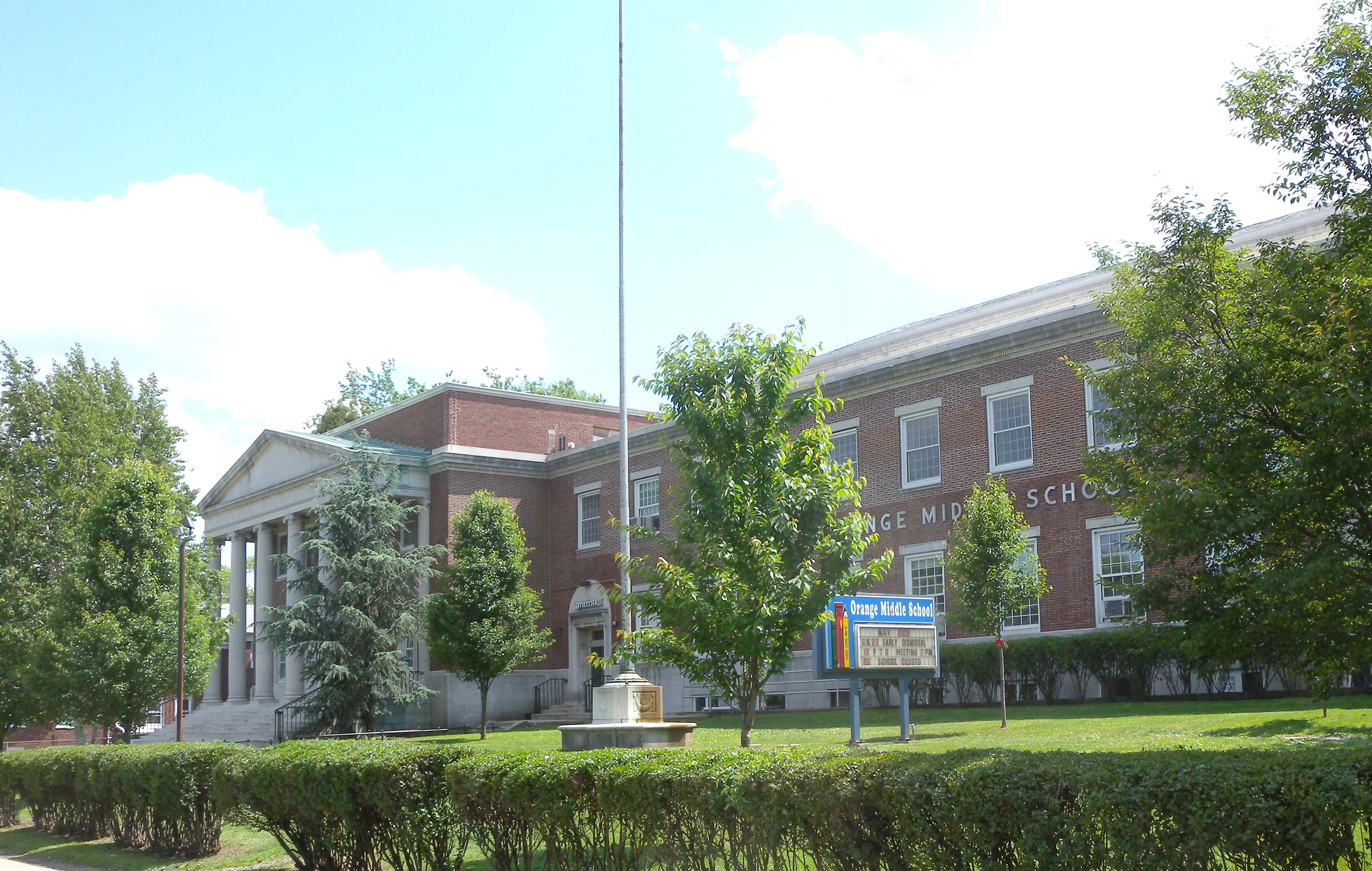
Orange Middle School

The Orange Board of Education serves public school students in pre-kindergarten through twelfth grade. The district is one of 31 former Abbott districts statewide that were established pursuant to the decision by the New Jersey Supreme Court in Abbott v. Burke which are now referred to as "SDA Districts" based on the requirement for the state to cover all costs for school building and renovation projects in these districts under the supervision of the New Jersey Schools Development Authority.

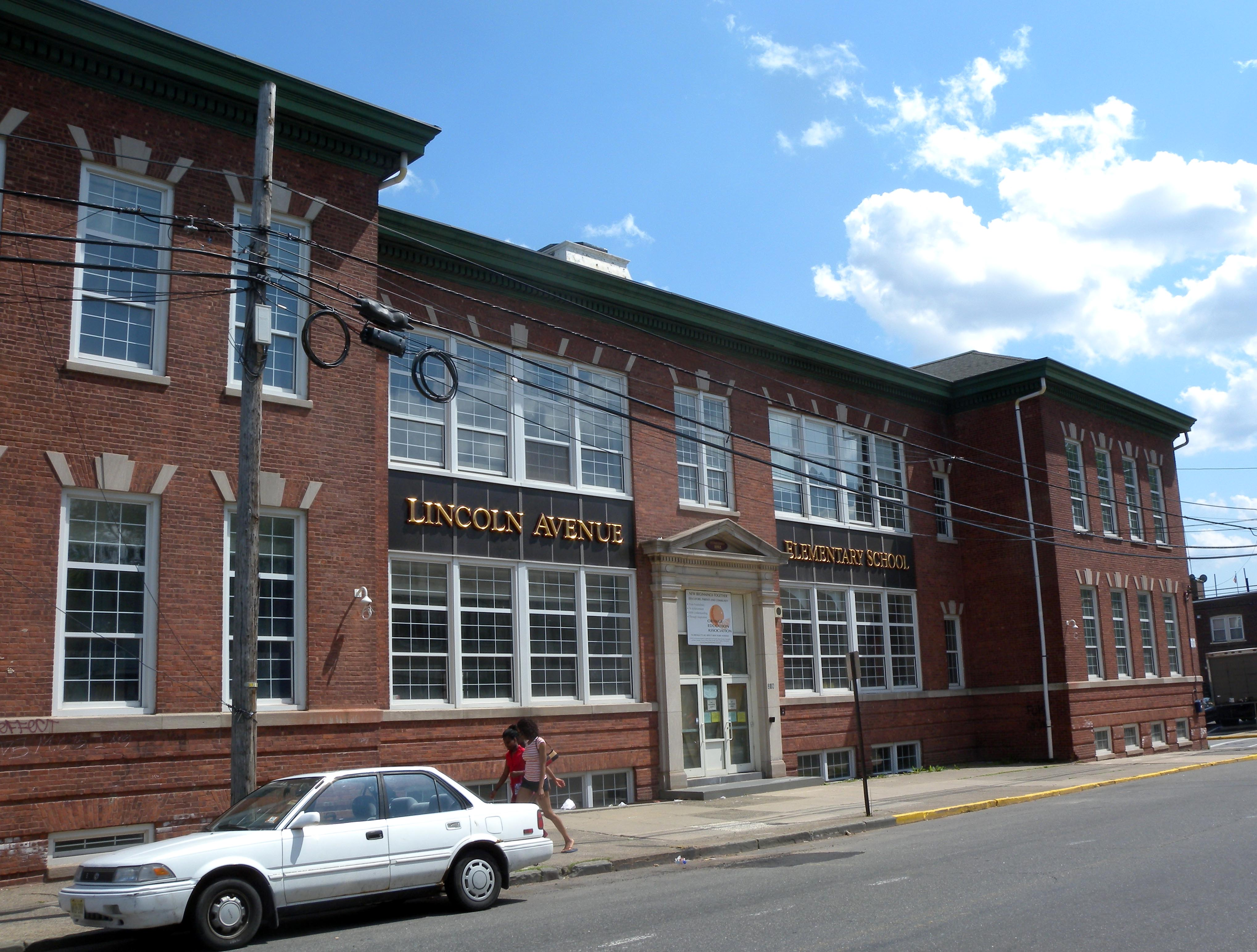
Lincoln Avenue School

As of the 2020–21 school year, the district, comprised of 12 schools, had an enrollment of 5,629 students and 507.5 classroom teachers (on an FTE basis), for a student–teacher ratio of 11.1:1. Schools in the district (with 2020–21 enrollment data from the National Center for Education Statistics) are Orange Early Childhood Center (188 students; in Pre-K), John Robert Lewis Early Childhood Center (NA; Pre-K), Central Elementary School (319; K–2), Cleveland Street School (303; K–7), Forest Street Community School (410; Pre-K–7), Heywood Avenue School (355; Pre-K–7), Lincoln Avenue School (708; K–7), Oakwood Avenue Community School (425; Pre-K–7), Park Avenue School (569; K–7), Rosa Parks Central Community School (999; Grades 3–7; formerly Main Street School and Central School), Scholars Academy (NA), Orange Preparatory Academy (679; 8–9, formerly Orange Middle School), Orange High School (840; 10–12) and STEM Innovation Academy of the Oranges (160; 9–12).

The Orange Public Library collection contains 200,000 volumes and circulates 43,000 items annually. Built as the Stickler Memorial Library, the imposing structure designed by McKim, Mead, and White opened in 1901.

== Economy ==
Portions of the city are part of an Urban Enterprise Zone (UEZ), one of 32 zones covering 37 municipalities statewide. Orange was selected in 1983 as one of the initial group of 10 zones chosen to participate in the program. In addition to other benefits to encourage employment and investment within the Zone, shoppers can take advantage of a reduced 3.3125% sales tax rate (half of the 6 5/8% rate charged statewide) at eligible merchants. Established in November 1992, the city's Urban Enterprise Zone status expires in November 2023.

== Transportation ==
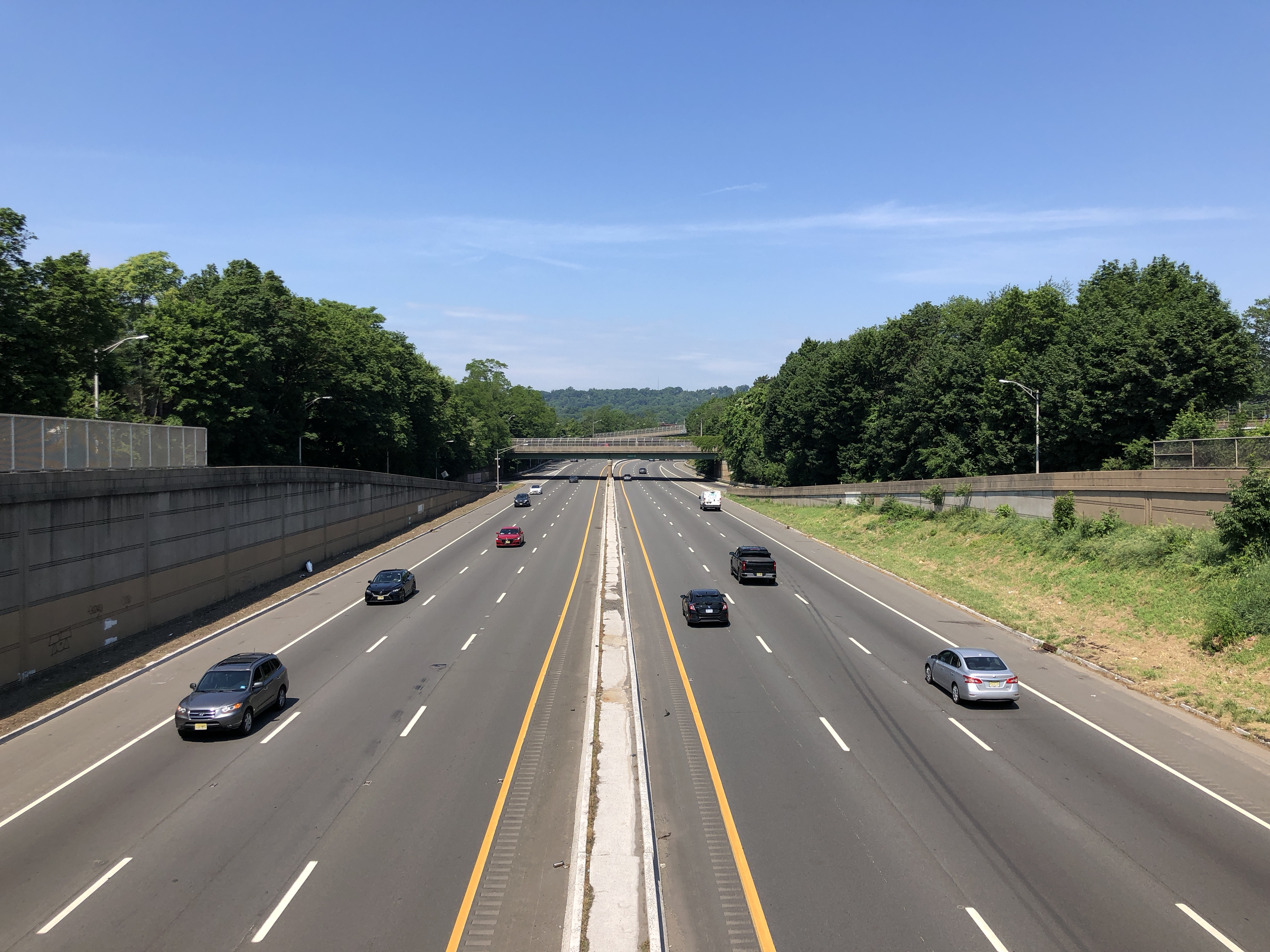
Interstate 280 westbound in Orange

=== Roads and highways ===
As of May 2010, the city had a total of 44.64 miles (71.84 km) of roadways, of which 39.14 miles (62.99 km) were maintained by the municipality, 4.43 miles (7.13 km) by Essex County and 1.07 miles (1.72 km) by the New Jersey Department of Transportation.

Interstate 280 is the most significant highway serving the city, traversing along an east-west alignment from the border with West Orange to the East Orange city line. The only other significant roadway serving Orange is County Route 508, which follows Central Avenue. Principal local roads include Valley Street, Lincoln Avenue, Scotland Road and Highland Avenue.

=== Public transportation ===
The Orange and Highland Avenue stations provide NJ Transit train service along the Morris & Essex Lines (formerly Erie Lackawanna Railway). Service is available via the Kearny Connection to Secaucus Junction and New York Penn Station in Midtown Manhattan and to Hoboken Terminal. Passengers can transfer at Newark Broad Street station or Summit station to reach the other destination if necessary.

NJ Transit buses in Orange include the 21, 24, 34, 41, 44, 71, 73 and 79 routes providing service to Newark and local service on the 92 and 97 routes.

== Points of interest ==
- Orange Reservoir
- Rosedale Cemetery
- St. Johns Catholic Cemetery
- St. Johns Church
- Columbus Hall
