= Church Street School (Nutley, New Jersey) =

- U.S. National Register of Historic Places
- New Jersey Register of Historic Places
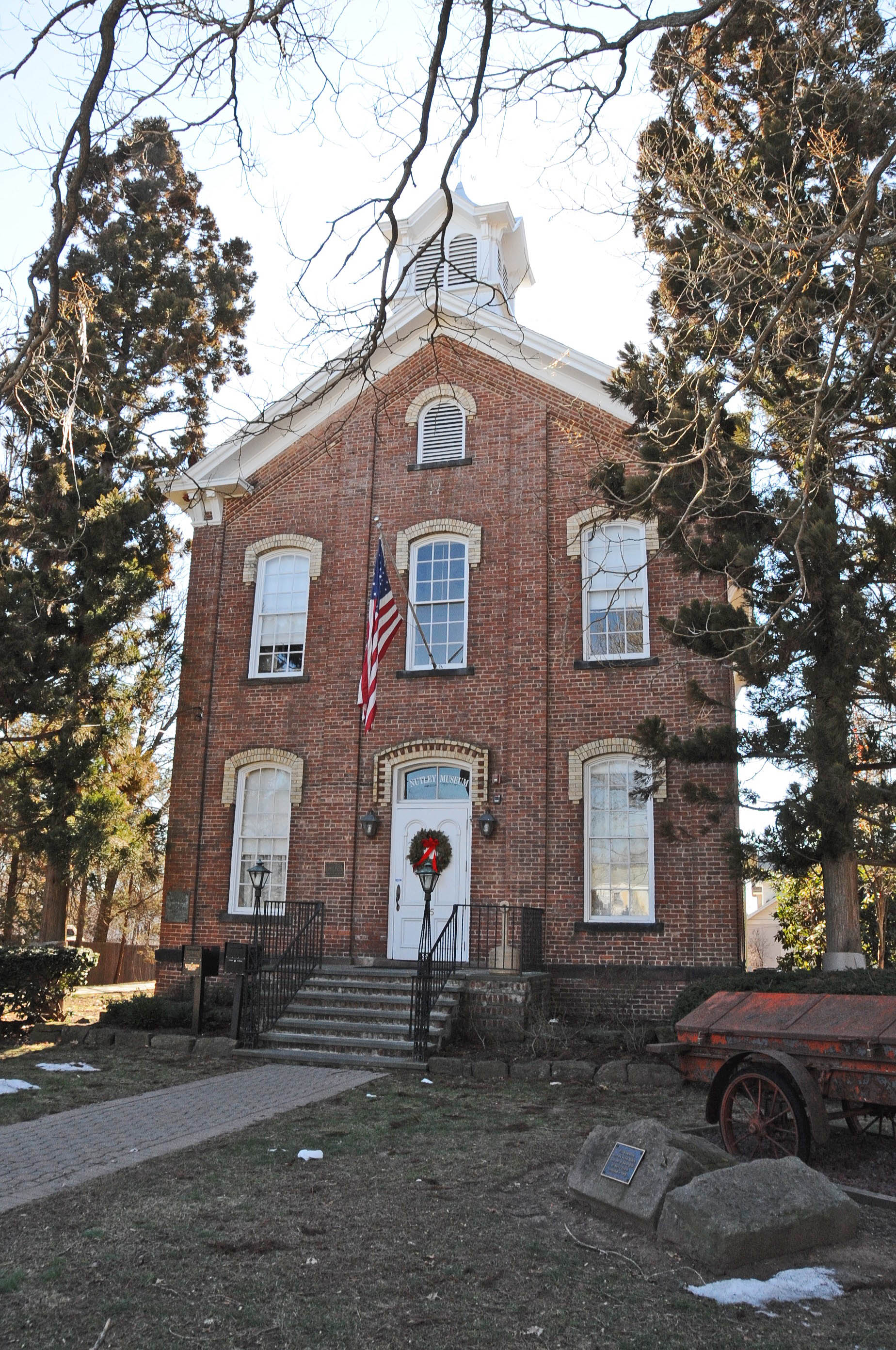

- Location within Essex County, New Jersey Location within New Jersey Location within the United States
- Location: 65 Church Street, Nutley, New Jersey
- Coordinates: 40°49′7″N 74°9′48″W
- Built: 1875
- Architectural style: Italianate
- NRHP reference No.: 95001042
- NJRHP No.
- Added to NRHP: August 25, 1995

Church Street School in Nutley, Essex County, New Jersey, United States, also known an Nutley Museum, was built in 1875. It was listed on the National Register of Historic Places in 1995. It contains items from local history as well as Annie Oakley artifacts.

== See also ==
- National Register of Historic Places listings in Essex County, New Jersey
