= Passaic Machine Works-Watts, Campbell & Company =

- U.S. National Register of Historic Places
- New Jersey Register of Historic Places
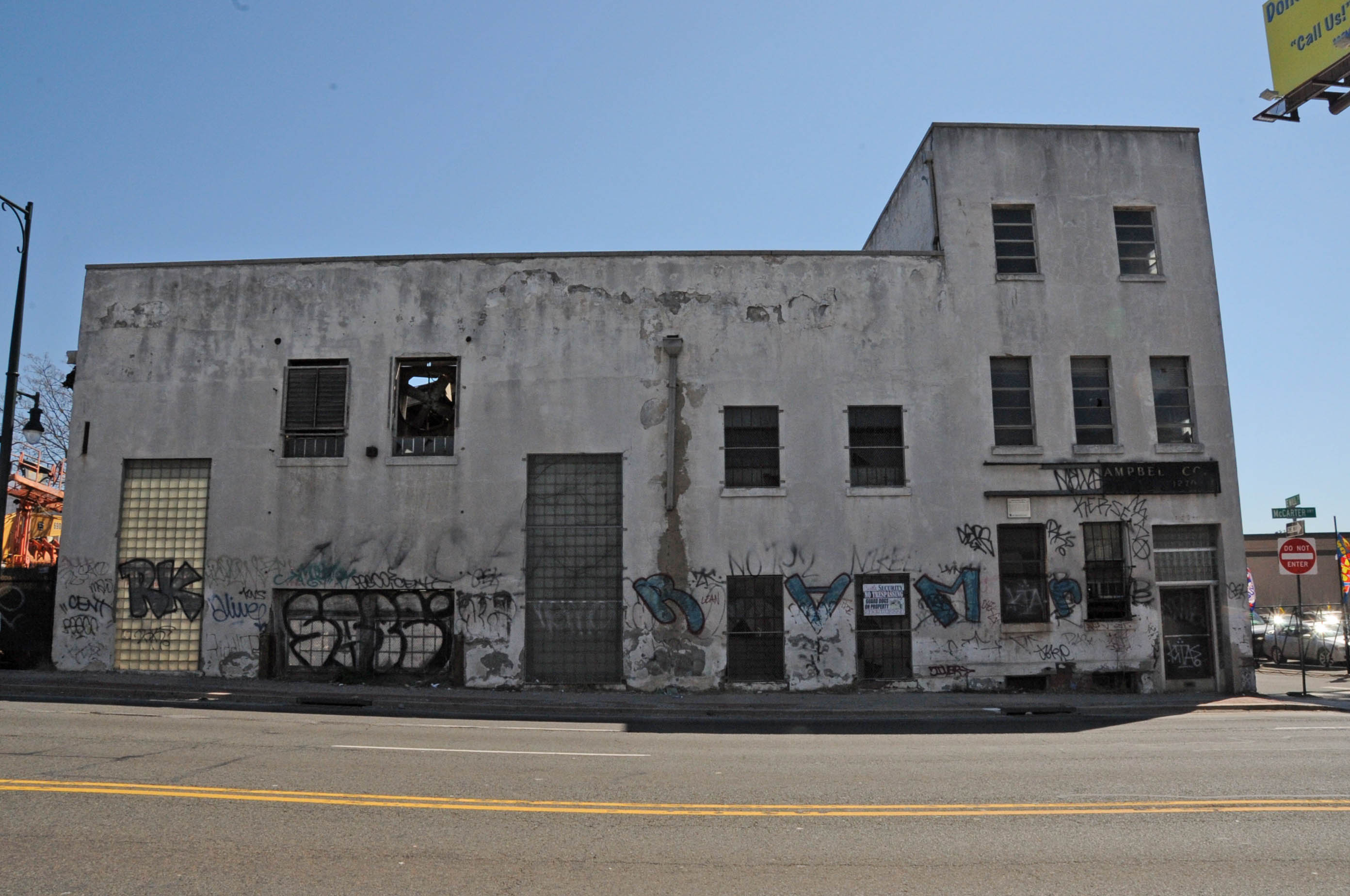
- Building in 2016 showing recent deterioration

- Location within Essex County, New Jersey Location within New Jersey Location within the United States
- Location: 1270 McCarter Highway, Newark, New Jersey
- Coordinates: 40°45′5″N 74°10′3″W
- Area: less than one acre
- NRHP reference No.: 86001503
- NJRHP No.: 1339

Significant dates
- Added to NRHP: August 13, 1986
- Designated NJRHP: June 24, 1986

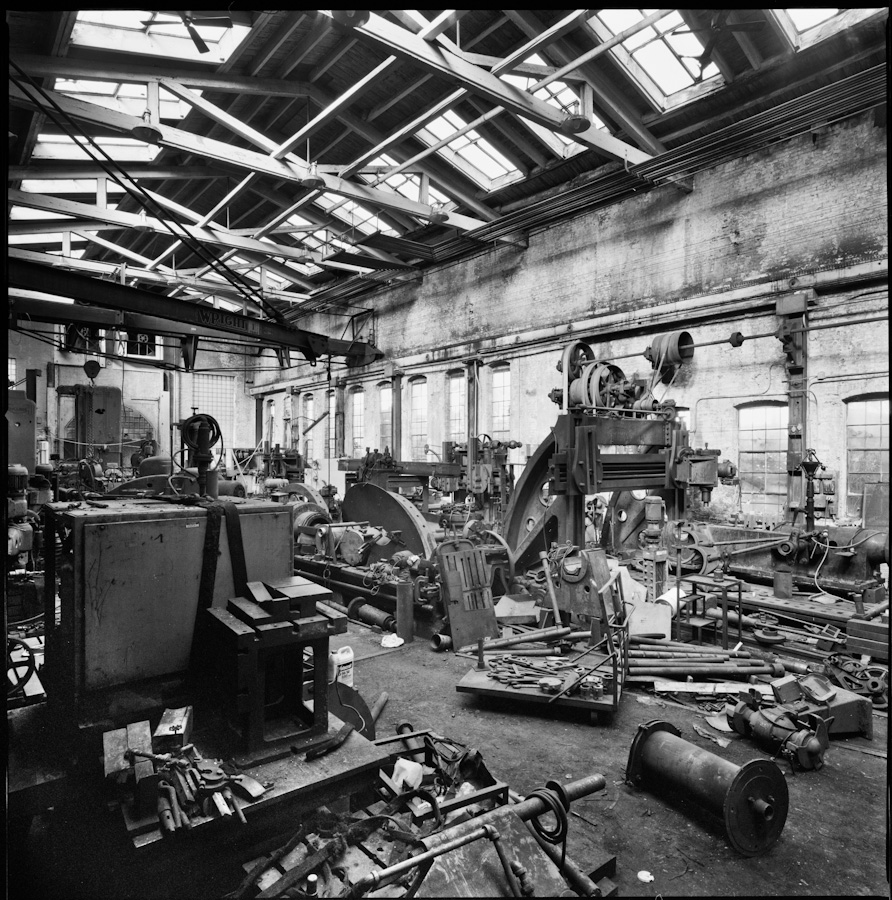
Watts, Campbell interior in 2010

Passaic Machine Works-Watts, Campbell & Company, is located in Newark, Essex County, New Jersey, United States. The building was added to the National Register of Historic Places on August 13, 1986.

Historically, Watts Campbell specialized in building steam engines and in rebuilding old machines. In its earlier days, the factory was about twice its current size and even included a metal casting division for factory orders. It was divided into two sections. The section abutting the Passaic River, now demolished, was the metal casting division. The section currently abutting McCarter Highway, still extant, was the metal fabrication division.

At its height, it employed over 330 machinists from the local area. It served Newark's industries and many other factories in the region. Customers ranged from Thomas Edison Labs to Campbell Soup Company. Watts Campbell was not unique in size. Even as late as 1950, many specialized factories surpassed Watts Campbell in size.

== Decline ==
As time passed, owing to developments in technology and the decreasing popularity of the Corliss steam engine, Watts Campbell stopped producing steam engines. The electrification of industry and more efficient steam turbine generators rendered the Corliss steam engines obsolete. After the 1920s, the factory specialized in constructing and repairing specialty machines for local industries.

During the 1950s the factory underwent a restoration that demolished the historic facade and mansard slate roof, paved the dirt floor, and stuccoed the interior. Nonetheless, the interior has remained generally untouched for more than 150 years. The interior houses much machinery that dates from as early as the 1850s. The original wooden roof trusses, windows, and furnishing remain in place.

Due to management's inability to upgrade equipment, the factory gradually lost customers due to aging and sometimes outdated machinery. Newark industry had gradually moved away, thereby decreasing Watts Campbell's ability to refurbish machinery. It had been in operation for almost 150 years before closing in 2007 due to dwindling numbers of customers. Watts Campbell was one of the last industrial revolution era factories in Newark to close. Currently, Watts Campbell has been repossessed by the City of Newark due to unpaid taxes. After Hurricane Sandy a large portion of the roof collapsed, exposing many of the historic machines to the elements. The factory is now largely unoccupied and in rapidly decaying condition. If not mitigated, the damaged roof is likely to worsen and possibly weaken the entire structure.

Watts Campbell is noted for the integrity of its machinery and historical relevance. Nationally, few factories have remained in the same place, with the same machinery, for over a hundred years. Watts Campbell is one of the last factories remaining in Newark. Almost all its industrial customers are gone, which included the Ballantine Brewery, Murphy Varnish, and Westinghouse. Watts Campbell has a collection of historic machinery, which its current owner, Chad Watts, has claimed is worth over a million dollars.

Most of Watts Campbell's records belong to The Henry Ford Museum in Dearborn, Michigan. The remaining, less valuable, files belong to former owner Chad Watts or are stored in the vacant factory's filing cabinets. Unfortunately, most of the actual machines sit rusted in the main assembly room or have been scrapped.

The Watts Campbell Company maintains files of old drawings, and patterns for its steam engines, as well of those of Hewes and Phillips Company which closed around 1912.

Restoring Watts Campbell to its former glory is complicated by many factors including:

- A dispute over property rights: the original factory has been divided, each half with a separate owner. Chad Watts subleased his property to John Sheahan when he was owner. But when the city of Newark foreclosed on the property for unpaid taxes, it did not evict the tenant.
- Decay: restoring the factory, although critical, will cost more if decay is not immediately stopped.
- Local politics: the city government lacks the financial means or interest to preserve Watts Campbell. Tourism could provide an impetus for restoration.

See also National Register of Historic Places listings in Essex County, New Jersey.
