= National Register of Historic Places listings in Essex County, New Jersey =

Location of Essex County in New Jersey

List of the National Register of Historic Places listings in Essex County, New Jersey

Contents: Counties and communities in New Jersey
Atlantic – Bergen (Closter, Franklin Lakes, Ridgewood, Saddle River, Wyckoff) – Burlington – Camden – Cape May – Cumberland – Essex – Gloucester – Hudson – Hunterdon – Mercer – Middlesex – Monmouth – Morris – Ocean – Passaic – Salem – Somerset – Sussex – Union – Warren

This is intended to be a complete list of properties and districts listed on the National Register of Historic Places in Essex County, New Jersey. Latitude and longitude coordinates of the sites listed on this page may be displayed in an online map.

Historic resources in the Montclair, New Jersey area were surveyed in 1986, leading to a number of separate listings.

This National Park Service list is complete through NPS recent listings posted November 6, 2026.

	Name on the Register	Image	Date listed	Location	City or town	Description
1	Ahavas Sholom	Ahavas Sholom	December 13, 2000 (#00001530)	145 Broadway; 40°45′19″N 74°10′12″W	Newark	Now site of Jewish Museum of New Jersey
2	Ambrose-Ward Mansion	Ambrose-Ward Mansion	September 20, 1982 (#82003272)	132 S. Harrison St. 40°45′51″N 74°13′20″W	East Orange	
3	Ampere Station	Ampere Station	June 22, 1984 (#84002628)	Ampere Plaza and Whitney Place; 40°45′55″N 74°11′40″W	East Orange	The station was closed in 1991 and demolished shortly after. Part of the Operating Passenger Railroad Stations TR.
4	The Anchorage	The Anchorage	July 1, 1988 (#86003061)	155 Wildwood Avenue; 40°50′13″N 74°12′15″W	Montclair	part of the Montclair Multiple Resource Area (MRA)
5	Anderson Park	Anderson Park	December 11, 2009 (#09001073)	SE corner of Bellevue and North Mountain Ave. 40°50′30″N 74°12′38″W	Montclair	First park in first county parks system in country.
6	John Ballantine House	John Ballantine House	October 2, 1973 (#73001093)	43 Washington St. 40°50′00″N 74°10′16″W	Newark	Now part of Newark Museum
7	Joseph Bardsley House	Joseph Bardsley House	July 1, 1988 (#86003059)	345 Park St. 40°50′11″N 74°12′09″W	Montclair	part of the Montclair MRA
8	Belleville Avenue Congregational Church	Belleville Avenue Congregational Church	August 13, 1986 (#86001505)	151 Broadway; 40°45′19″N 74°10′12″W	Newark	
9	Bethany Baptist Church	Bethany Baptist Church	May 10, 1989 (#88000466)	117 W. Market St. 40°44′25″N 74°11′01″W	Newark	Photo shows the replacement church. The original has been demolished
10	Bloomfield Green Historic District	Bloomfield Green Historic District	April 20, 1978 (#78001757)	Bounded by Belleville Ave., Montgomery, Spruce, State, Liberty, and Franklin Sts. 40°47′48″N 74°11′44″W	Bloomfield	
11	Bloomfield Station	Bloomfield Station	June 22, 1984 (#84002631)	Washington St. and Glenwood Ave. 40°47′33″N 74°12′03″W	Bloomfield	part of the Operating Passenger Railroad Stations TR
12	Bradner`s Pharmacy	Bradner`s Pharmacy	July 1, 1988 (#86003010)	33 Watchung Plaza; 40°49′48″N 74°12′21″W	Montclair	part of the Montclair MRA
13	Branch Brook Park	Branch Brook Park	January 12, 1981 (#81000392)	Roughly bounded by Belleville Park, Washington and Clifton Aves., 6th and Orange Sts. 40°46′05″N 74°10′32″W	Newark and Belleville	
14	Brick Church Station	Brick Church Station	June 22, 1984 (#84002636)	Brick Church Plaza; 40°45′56″N 74°13′10″W	East Orange	part of the Operating Passenger Railroad Stations TR
15	Caldwell Presbyterian Church Manse	Caldwell Presbyterian Church Manse	November 16, 1977 (#77000861)	207 Bloomfield Avenue; 40°50′15″N 74°16′22″W	Caldwell	Birthplace of Grover Cleveland
16	Canfield-Morgan House	Canfield-Morgan House	November 7, 1995 (#95001265)	899-903 Pompton Ave. (NJ 23); 40°51′48″N 74°13′51″W	Cedar Grove	
17	Carnegie Library	Carnegie Library	July 1, 1988 (#86003074)	Church St. at Valley Rd. 40°48′55″N 74°13′15″W	Montclair	part of the Montclair MRA
18	Casa Deldra	Casa Deldra	July 1, 1988 (#86003062)	35 Afterglow Way; 40°49′18″N 74°13′42″W	Montclair	part of the Montclair MRA
19	Catedral Evangelica Reformada	Catedral Evangelica Reformada	October 26, 1972 (#72000773)	27 Lincoln Park and Halsey St. 40°43′38″N 74°10′43″W	Newark	
20	Cathedral of the Sacred Heart	Cathedral of the Sacred Heart	December 22, 1976 (#76001151)	89 Ridge St. 40°45′18″N 74°10′43″W	Newark	
21	Central Avenue Commercial Historic District	Central Avenue Commercial Historic District	August 26, 1983 (#83001600)	560-654 Central Ave. 40°45′42″N 74°13′29″W	East Orange	
22	Central Presbyterian Church	Central Presbyterian Church	November 14, 1986 (#86003051)	46 Park St. 40°49′04″N 74°13′04″W	Montclair	part of the Montclair MRA
23	J. M. Chapman House	J. M. Chapman House	July 1, 1988 (#86002975)	10 Rockledge; 40°49′22″N 74°13′38″W	Montclair	part of the Montclair MRA
24	Church Street School	Church Street School	August 25, 1995 (#95001042)	65 Church St., Nutley Township; 40°49′07″N 74°09′49″W	Nutley	
25	William Clark House	William Clark House	November 10, 1977 (#77000863)	346 Mount Prospect Ave. 40°45′50″N 74°10′20″W	Newark	
26	Cliffside Hose Company No. 4	Cliffside Hose Company No. 4	July 1, 1988 (#86003077)	588 Valley Rd. 40°50′24″N 74°12′34″W	Montclair	part of the Montclair MRA
27	Collins House	Collins House	July 3, 2017 (#100001264)	108 Baldwin St. 40°48′26″N 74°11′29″W	Bloomfield Township	
28	Community Hospital	Community Hospital	March 22, 2004 (#04000224)	130 W. Kinney Street; 40°43′50″N 74°10′58″W	Newark	Formerly Kenney Memorial Hospital, now New Salem Baptist Church
29	Congregational Church	Congregational Church	July 1, 1988 (#86003050)	42 S. Fullerton Ave. 40°48′45″N 74°13′11″W	Montclair	part of the Montclair MRA
30	Israel Crane House	Israel Crane House	March 14, 1973 (#73001091)	110 Orange Road; 40°48′41″N 74°13′26″W	Montclair	
31	Day Street Public School	Day Street Public School	August 28, 2012 (#12000568)	29 N. Day St. 40°46′23″N 74°13′44″W	Orange	
32	Dock Bridge	Dock Bridge	October 3, 1980 (#80002484)	Spans Passaic River; 40°44′09″N 74°09′43″W	Newark	
33	East Orange Station	East Orange Station	June 22, 1984 (#84002638)	65 City Hall Plaza; 40°45′40″N 74°12′40″W	East Orange	part of the Operating Passenger Railroad Stations TR
34	East Orange VA Hospital	East Orange VA Hospital	September 4, 2018 (#100002831)	385 Tremont Avenue; 40°45′16″N 74°14′09″W	East Orange	Known as East Orange VA Medical Center, part of United States Third Generation Veterans Hospitals MPS
35	Eastward	Eastward	July 1, 1988 (#86002980)	50 Lloyd Rd. 40°49′07″N 74°13′45″W	Montclair	part of the Montclair MRA
36	Edison National Historic Site	Edison National Historic Site	October 15, 1966 (#66000052)	Main St. between Alden and Lakeside Sts. 40°47′13″N 74°14′16″W	West Orange	
37	Edison Storage Battery Company Building	Edison Storage Battery Company Building	February 28, 1996 (#96000055)	177 Main St. 40°46′57″N 74°14′07″W	West Orange	
38	Thomas Edison National Historical Park	Thomas Edison National Historical Park	April 17, 2023 (#100008826)	211 Main St. and 12 Honeysuckle Ave. 40°47′03″N 74°14′03″W	West Orange	
39	Egbert Farm	Egbert Farm	July 1, 1988 (#86002996)	128 N. Mountain Ave. 40°49′39″N 74°13′08″W	Montclair	part of the Montclair MRA
40	Eighteenth Avenue School	Eighteenth Avenue School	April 14, 2015 (#15000151)	229-243 18th Ave. 40°43′45″N 74°11′31″W	Newark	
41	Enclosure Historic District	Enclosure Historic District	December 31, 1974 (#74001160)	Enclosure and Calico Lane; 40°49′11″N 74°09′16″W	Nutley	
42	Essex Club	Essex Club	February 22, 1991 (#91000110)	52 Park Place; 40°44′20″N 74°10′07″W	Newark	
43	Essex County Courthouse	Essex County Courthouse	June 26, 1975 (#75001135)	470 High Street; 40°44′13″N 74°10′45″W	Newark	
44	Essex County Jail	Essex County Jail	September 3, 1991 (#91001366)	21 Wilsey St. 40°44′40″N 74°10′58″W	Newark	
45	Essex County Park Commission Administration Building	Essex County Park Commission Administration Building	November 11, 1977 (#77000864)	115 Clifton Ave. 40°45′12″N 74°10′41″W	Newark	
46	The Everett Court Apartments	The Everett Court Apartments	June 28, 2021 (#100006672)	76-80 Court St. 40°43′56″N 74°10′43″W	Newark	
47	Evergreen Cemetery	Evergreen Cemetery	July 9, 1991 (#91000882)	1137 N. Broad St. 40°41′32″N 74°12′39″W	Newark	
48	Fairfield Dutch Reformed Church	Fairfield Dutch Reformed Church	October 7, 1975 (#75001134)	Fairfield Rd. 40°53′04″N 74°16′57″W	Fairfield	
49	Feigenspan Mansion	Feigenspan Mansion	October 5, 1977 (#77000865)	710 High St. 40°43′41″N 74°10′58″W	Newark	
50	Henry Fenn House	Henry Fenn House	July 1, 1988 (#86002988)	208 N. Mountain Ave. 40°49′59″N 74°13′02″W	Montclair	part of the Montclair MRA
51	First Baptist Peddie Memorial Church	First Baptist Peddie Memorial Church	October 30, 1972 (#72000774)	Broad and Fulton Sts. 40°44′29″N 74°10′09″W	Newark	
52	First Methodist Episcopal Church	First Methodist Episcopal Church	July 1, 1988 (#86003048)	24 N. Fullerton Ave. 40°48′55″N 74°13′06″W	Montclair	part of the Montclair MRA
53	First National State Bank Building	First National State Bank Building	August 10, 1977 (#77000866)	810 Broad St. 40°44′04″N 74°10′22″W	Newark	
54	Forest Hill Historic District	Forest Hill Historic District	August 3, 1990 (#90001193)	Roughly bounded by Verona Ave., Mt. Prospect Ave., 2nd Ave., and Branch Brook Park; 40°46′22″N 74°10′14″W	Newark	
55	Four Corners Historic District	Four Corners Historic District	September 8, 2000 (#00001061)	Roughly bounded by Raymond Blvd., Mulberry St., Hill St. and Washington St. 40°44′06″N 74°10′26″W	Newark	
56	Free Public Library, Upper Montclair Branch	Free Public Library, Upper Montclair Branch	July 1, 1988 (#86003076)	185 Bellevue Avenue, Upper Montclair; 40°50′29″N 74°12′19″W	Montclair	part of the Montclair MRA
57	Glen Ridge Historic District	Glen Ridge Historic District	August 9, 1982 (#82004784)	Roughly bounded by Bay St., Essex and Midland Aves., Adams Pl., Spencer Rd., and Franklin Pl. • Boundary increase (listed November 14, 1988, refnum 88002155): North side roughly along Ridgewood and Forest Ave. from Bay to Gray St., south side along Hawthorne, Carteret, and Midland Ave. • Boundary increase (listed July 9, 2013, refnum 13000480): Ridgewood, Sommer, Hawthorne, Victor, Forest, Oakwood, Watchung, Prescott & Sunset Aves., Brooklawn & Stonehouse Rds. 40°47′52″N 74°12′19″W	Glen Ridge	
58	Glencoe	Glencoe	October 1, 1991 (#91001481)	698 Martin Luther King Blvd. 40°43′42″N 74°10′56″W	Newark	
59	Frank Goodwillie House	Frank Goodwillie House	July 1, 1988 (#86003058)	17 Wayside Pl. 40°48′16″N 74°13′51″W	Montclair	part of the Montclair MRA
60	Grace Church	Grace Church	November 2, 1972 (#72000776)	Broad and Walnut Sts. 40°43′50″N 74°10′28″W	Newark	
61	Griffith Building	Griffith Building	May 24, 1984 (#84002641)	605-607 Broad Street; 40°44′27″N 74°10′11″W	Newark	
62	Hahne and Company	Hahne and Company	August 30, 1994 (#94001005)	609 Broad Street; 40°44′25″N 74°10′14″W	Newark	
63	Samuel Orton Harrison House	Samuel Orton Harrison House	June 30, 1980 (#80002488)	153 Orton Rd. 40°49′50″N 74°18′15″W	West Caldwell	
64	Haskell`s Bloomfield Villa	Haskell`s Bloomfield Villa	July 1, 1988 (#86003002)	84 Llewellyn Rd. 40°48′16″N 74°13′35″W	Montclair	part of the Montclair MRA
65	Home Office Building	Home Office Building	June 17, 1982 (#82003273)	8-12 Park Pl. 40°44′25″N 74°10′07″W	Newark	
66	House at 147 Park Street	House at 147 Park Street	July 1, 1988 (#86003064)	147 Park St. 40°49′23″N 74°12′40″W	Montclair	part of the Montclair MRA
67	House at 18 Brunswick Road	House at 18 Brunswick Road	July 1, 1988 (#86003035)	18 Brunswick Rd. 40°49′33″N 74°12′51″W	Montclair	part of the Montclair MRA
68	House at 21 Stonebridge Road	House at 21 Stonebridge Road	July 1, 1988 (#86003073)	21 Stonebridge Rd. 40°48′04″N 74°13′41″W	Montclair	part of the Montclair MRA
69	House at 52 Wayside Place	House at 52 Wayside Place	July 1, 1988 (#86003041)	52 Wayside Pl. 40°48′05″N 74°13′52″W	Montclair	part of the Montclair MRA
70	House at 53 Lloyd Road	House at 53 Lloyd Road	July 1, 1988 (#86002973)	53 Lloyd Rd. 40°49′03″N 74°13′45″W	Montclair	part of the Montclair MRA
71	House at 67 Warren Place	House at 67 Warren Place	July 1, 1988 (#86003004)	67 Warren Pl. 40°48′20″N 74°13′36″W	Montclair	part of the Montclair MRA
72	House at 68 Eagle Rock Way	House at 68 Eagle Rock Way	July 1, 1988 (#86003009)	68 Eagle Rock Way; 40°50′28″N 74°12′33″W	Montclair	part of the Montclair MRA
73	House at 7 South Mountain Terrace	House at 7 South Mountain Terrace	November 15, 1986 (#86003235)	7 S. Mountain Terr. 40°48′37″N 74°13′51″W	Montclair	part of the Montclair MRA
74	House at 80 Lloyd Road	House at 80 Lloyd Road	July 1, 1988 (#86003003)	80 Lloyd Rd. 40°48′57″N 74°13′50″W	Montclair	part of the Montclair MRA
75	House at 97 Warren Place	House at 97 Warren Place	July 1, 1988 (#86003070)	97 Warren Pl. 40°48′39″N 74°13′44″W	Montclair	part of the Montclair MRA
76	House of Prayer Episcopal Church and Rectory	House of Prayer Episcopal Church and Rectory	October 30, 1972 (#72000777)	Broad and State Sts. 40°44′53″N 74°10′17″W	Newark	
77	The House that Lives	The House that Lives	July 1, 1988 (#86002976)	83 Watchung Ave. 40°49′52″N 74°12′34″W	Montclair	part of the Montclair MRA
78	Indian and the Puritan	Indian and the Puritan	October 28, 1994 (#94001256)	Opposite 5 Washington Street; 40°44′38″N 74°10′13″W	Newark	part of the Public Sculpture in Newark, New Jersey Multiple Property Submission
79	Interstate Hosiery Mills, Inc. Mill Building	Interstate Hosiery Mills, Inc. Mill Building	December 30, 2009 (#09001176)	110 N. Fulton St. 40°47′16″N 74°12′27″W	Bloomfield	
80	Jacobus House	Jacobus House	April 1, 1975 (#75001133)	178 Grove Ave. 40°51′03″N 74°14′06″W	Cedar Grove	
81	James Street Commons Historic District	James Street Commons Historic District	January 9, 1978 (#78001758)	Roughly bounded by Halsey, Warren, Boyden, Bleeker, Orange, and Broad Streets; 40°44′36″N 74°10′25″W	Newark	Boundary increase approved September 22, 1983
82	Eugene V. Kelly Carriage House	Eugene V. Kelly Carriage House	November 10, 1975 (#75001136)	S. Orange Ave., Seton Hall University campus 40°44′40″N 74°14′38″W	South Orange	Historic building from 1887, with 5 acres, now on Seton Hall University campus
83	Kingsland Manor	Kingsland Manor	March 24, 1978 (#78001762)	3 Kingsland Street; 40°49′35″N 74°08′35″W	Nutley	
84	Krueger Mansion	Krueger Mansion	November 9, 1972 (#72000778)	601 High St. 40°43′57″N 74°10′54″W	Newark	
85	Lincoln Park Historic District	Lincoln Park Historic District	January 5, 1984 (#84002646)	Lincoln Park, Clinton Avenue, and Spruce and Broad Streets; 40°43′35″N 74°10′46″W	Newark	
86	Llewellyn Park Historic District	Llewellyn Park Historic District	February 28, 1986 (#86000423)	Roughly bounded by Eagle Rock Ave., Main St., Pleasant Ave., and NJ 280; 40°47′37″N 74°14′25″W	West Orange	
87	Maple Avenue School	Maple Avenue School	February 6, 2020 (#100004957)	33 Maple Ave. 40°42′31″N 74°12′55″W	Newark	
88	Maplewood Memorial Park	Maplewood Memorial Park	August 3, 2015 (#15000489)	Bounded by Oakland & Dunnell Rds., Valley & Baker Sts. 40°43′51″N 74°16′23″W	Maplewood	
89	Maplewood Municipal Building	Maplewood Municipal Building	October 1, 2014 (#14000810)	574 Valley St. 40°43′48″N 74°16′18″W	Maplewood	
90	Maplewood Village Historic District	Maplewood Village Historic District	April 25, 2022 (#100007649)	Maplewood Ave., Durand Rd., Baker St., Highland, Inwood and Lenox Pls. 40°43′49″N 74°16′42″W	Maplewood	
91	Marlboro Park Historic District	Marlboro Park Historic District	July 22, 1988 (#86002967)	Roughly along Fairfield St., Waterbury Rd., Montclair Ave., and Watchung Ave. between N. Fullerton and Grove Sts. 40°49′46″N 74°12′09″W	Montclair	part of the Montclair MRA
92	Marsellis House	Marsellis House	July 1, 1988 (#86003031)	190 Cooper Ave. 40°50′19″N 74°12′21″W	Montclair	part of the Montclair MRA
93	Military Park Commons Historic District	Military Park Commons Historic District	June 18, 2004 (#04000649)	Roughly bounded by Washington Place, McCarter Highway, E. Park Street and Raymond Boulevard; 40°44′19″N 74°10′09″W	Newark	
94	Miller Street Historic District	Miller Street Historic District	July 1, 1988 (#86002971)	Miller and Fulton Sts. between Elmwood Ave., Elm, and New Sts. 40°48′26″N 74°12′53″W	Montclair	part of the Montclair MRA
95	George A. Miller House	George A. Miller House	July 1, 1988 (#86002979)	275 Claremont Ave. 40°49′13″N 74°13′11″W	Montclair	part of the Montclair MRA
96	Montclair Art Museum	Montclair Art Museum	November 14, 1986 (#86002984)	3 S. Mountain Ave. 40°49′07″N 74°13′27″W	Montclair	part of the Montclair MRA
97	Montclair Railroad Station	Montclair Railroad Station	January 8, 1973 (#73001092)	Lackawanna Plaza; 40°48′41″N 74°12′48″W	Montclair	
98	Montrose Park Historic District	Montrose Park Historic District	August 29, 1997 (#97000978)	Roughly bounded by S. Orange, Sanford, and Heywood Aves., and Holland Rd. 40°44′57″N 74°14′52″W	South Orange	
99	Morris Canal	Morris Canal	October 1, 1974 (#74002228)	Irregular line beginning at Phillipsburg and ending at Jersey City; 40°41′08″N 75°09′49″W	Not Applicable	
100	Mount Pleasant Cemetery	Mount Pleasant Cemetery	October 28, 1988 (#87000836)	375 Broadway; 40°45′50″N 74°09′51″W	Newark	
101	Mountain Avenue Station	Mountain Avenue Station	June 22, 1984 (#84002654)	451 Upper Mountain Avenue, Upper Montclair; 40°50′57″N 74°12′21″W	Montclair	part of the Operating Passenger Railroad Stations TR
102	Mountain District	Mountain District	July 22, 1988 (#86002970)	Roughly bounded by Highland, Bradford, Upper Mountain, and Claremont Aves. 40°49′52″N 74°13′10″W	Montclair	part of the Montclair MRA
103	Mountain Station	Mountain Station	September 29, 1984 (#84002656)	449 Vose Ave. 40°45′17″N 74°15′13″W	South Orange	part of the Operating Passenger Railroad Stations TR
104	Mulford House	Mulford House	July 1, 1988 (#86003038)	207 Union St. 40°48′42″N 74°13′50″W	Montclair	part of the Montclair MRA
105	Murphy Varnish Works	Murphy Varnish Works	March 9, 1979 (#79001484)	McWhorter, Vesey, and Chestnut Sts. 40°43′28″N 74°10′14″W	Newark	
106	Mutual Benefit Life Insurance Company	Mutual Benefit Life Insurance Company	November 17, 1983 (#83004031)	300 Broadway and 2nd St. 40°45′40″N 74°10′10″W	Newark	
107	New Jersey Bell Headquarters Building	New Jersey Bell Headquarters Building	September 21, 2005 (#05001054)	540 Broad St. 40°44′42″N 74°10′08″W	Newark	
108	New Point Baptist Church	New Point Baptist Church	November 2, 1972 (#72000779)	17 E. Kinney St. 40°43′41″N 74°10′32″W	Newark	
109	Newark Broad Street Station	Newark Broad Street Station	June 22, 1984 (#84002662)	Broad and University Streets; 40°44′50″N 74°10′20″W	Newark	part of the Operating Passenger Railroad Stations TR
110	Newark City Hall	Newark City Hall	February 17, 1978 (#78001759)	920 Broad St. 40°43′54″N 74°10′27″W	Newark	
111	Newark Female Charitable Society	Newark Female Charitable Society	September 12, 1979 (#79001485)	305 Halsey St., 41-43 Hill St. 40°43′56″N 74°10′36″W	Newark	
112	Newark Metropolitan Airport Buildings	Newark Metropolitan Airport Buildings	December 12, 1980 (#80002485)	U.S. 22; 40°42′23″N 74°09′45″W	Newark	
113	Newark Orphan Asylum	Newark Orphan Asylum	June 19, 1973 (#73001094)	High and Bleeker Sts., Newark College of Engineering; 40°44′36″N 74°15′37″W	Newark	
114	North Broad Street Historic District	North Broad Street Historic District	July 23, 1996 (#96000813)	136-148 Broad St. 40°45′27″N 74°10′08″W	Newark	
115	North Reformed Church	North Reformed Church	October 5, 1972 (#72000780)	510 Broad St. 40°44′39″N 74°10′10″W	Newark	
116	Oakes Estate	Oakes Estate	August 6, 1981 (#81000390)	240 Belleville Ave. 40°47′56″N 74°11′27″W	Bloomfield	
117	Old First Presbyterian Church	Old First Presbyterian Church	November 2, 1972 (#72000781)	820 Broad St. 40°44′03″N 74°10′22″W	Newark	
118	Orange Free Public Library	Orange Free Public Library	September 28, 1981 (#81000393)	348 Main St. 40°46′21″N 74°13′56″W	Orange	
119	Orange Memorial Hospital Historic District	Orange Memorial Hospital Historic District	November 17, 2015 (#15000797)	180 S. Essex Ave. 40°46′05″N 74°14′02″W	Orange	
120	Orange Station	Orange Station	June 22, 1984 (#84002665)	73 Lincoln Avenue; 40°46′18″N 74°14′02″W	Orange	part of the Operating Passenger Railroad Stations TR
121	Pan American C.M.A. Church	Pan American C.M.A. Church	July 31, 1972 (#72000782)	76 Prospect St. 40°43′48″N 74°09′47″W	Newark	
122	Passaic Machine Works-Watts, Campbell & Company	Passaic Machine Works-Watts, Campbell & Company	August 13, 1986 (#86001503)	1270 McCarter Hwy. 40°45′02″N 74°10′04″W	Newark	
123	Pennsylvania Station	Pennsylvania Station	December 20, 1978 (#78001760)	Raymond Plaza West; 40°44′03″N 74°09′53″W	Newark	
124	Pine Street Historic District	Pine Street Historic District	March 16, 2000 (#00000175)	Roughly bounded by Glenridge Ave., the NJ TRANSIT Boonton Line, Pine and Baldwin Sts. 40°48′35″N 74°12′28″W	Montclair	
125	Post Office Building, Upper Montclair	Post Office Building, Upper Montclair	July 1, 1988 (#86003012)	242-244 Bellevue Avenue, Upper Montclair; 40°50′28″N 74°12′33″W	Montclair	part of the Montclair MRA
126	Presby Memorial Iris Gardens Horticultural Center	Presby Memorial Iris Gardens Horticultural Center	September 17, 1980 (#80002483)	474 Upper Mountain Ave. 40°51′05″N 74°12′23″W	Montclair	
127	Protestant Foster Home	Protestant Foster Home	February 13, 1986 (#86000211)	272-284 Broadway; 40°45′37″N 74°10′11″W	Newark	
128	Queen of Angels Church	Queen of Angels Church	October 26, 1972 (#72000783)	Belmont Ave. at Morton St. 40°43′00″N 74°11′22″W	Newark	
129	M. F. Reading House	M. F. Reading House	July 1, 1988 (#86003006)	87 Midland Ave. 40°49′10″N 74°13′01″W	Montclair	part of the Montclair MRA
130	Red Gables	Red Gables	July 1, 1988 (#86002992)	99 S. Fullerton Ave. 40°48′29″N 74°13′08″W	Montclair	part of the Montclair MRA
131	Reformed Dutch Church of Second River	Reformed Dutch Church of Second River	December 21, 1978 (#78001756)	171 Main St. 40°47′12″N 74°08′58″W	Belleville	
132	Riverbank Park	Riverbank Park	April 16, 1998 (#98000351)	Roughly bounded by Van Buren, Market, and Somme Sts., and Passaic R. 40°43′55″N 74°09′09″W	Newark	
133	Route 1 Extension	Route 1 Extension	August 12, 2005 (#05000880)	US 1 and 9 milepoint: 51.25-54.55, NJ 139 milepoint 0-1.45; 40°44′09″N 74°05′30″W	Newark	Includes Pulaski Skyway. Also listed in Hudson County section.
134	Salaam Temple	Salaam Temple	October 5, 1977 (#77000867)	1020 Broad St. 40°43′40″N 74°10′35″W	Newark	Later became Newark Symphony Hall
135	Charles S. Shultz House	Charles S. Shultz House	July 22, 1979 (#79001482)	30 N. Mountain Ave. 40°49′17″N 74°13′24″W	Montclair	
136	Seated Lincoln	Seated Lincoln	March 30, 1995 (#95000303)	Junction of Springfield and Market Streets, Essex County Courthouse; 40°44′13″N 74°10′40″W	Newark	part of the Public Sculpture in Newark, New Jersey Multiple Property Submission
137	Second Reformed Dutch Church	Second Reformed Dutch Church	March 7, 1979 (#79001486)	178-184 Edison Pl. 40°43′57″N 74°09′51″W	Newark	
138	Short Hills Park Historic District	Short Hills Park Historic District	September 18, 1980 (#80002482)	Off NJ 24; 40°43′53″N 74°19′38″W	Millburn	
139	S. C. Smith House	S. C. Smith House	July 1, 1988 (#86002978)	40 Northview Ave. 40°50′23″N 74°12′25″W	Montclair	part of the Montclair MRA
140	South Orange Fire Department	South Orange Fire Department	March 19, 1998 (#98000255)	Junction of First and Sloan Sts. 40°44′43″N 74°15′39″W	South Orange Village	
141	South Orange Station	South Orange Station	June 22, 1984 (#84002669)	19 Sloan St. 40°44′45″N 74°15′39″W	South Orange	part of the Operating Passenger Railroad Stations TR
142	South Orange Village Hall	South Orange Village Hall	May 28, 1976 (#76001152)	S. Orange Ave. and Scotland Rd. 40°44′46″N 74°15′30″W	South Orange	
143	South Park Calvary United Presbyterian Church	South Park Calvary United Presbyterian Church	December 5, 1972 (#72000784)	1035 Broad Street; 40°43′34″N 74°10′31″W	Newark	
144	St. Barnabas' Episcopal Church	St. Barnabas' Episcopal Church	October 18, 1972 (#72000785)	W. Market St. and Sussex and Roseville Aves. 40°45′04″N 74°11′38″W	Newark	
145	St. Casimir's Roman Catholic Church	St. Casimir's Roman Catholic Church	July 9, 1997 (#97000773)	164 Nichols St. 40°43′24″N 74°09′32″W	Newark	
146	St. Columba's Church	St. Columba's Church	October 30, 1972 (#72000786)	Pennsylvania Ave. and Brunswick St. 40°43′28″N 74°10′49″W	Newark	
147	St. James' A. M. E. Church	St. James' A. M. E. Church	October 18, 1972 (#72000787)	High and Court Sts. 40°43′57″N 74°10′52″W	Newark	
148	St. John's Church	St. John's Church	October 30, 1972 (#72000789)	22-26 Mulberry St. 40°44′17″N 74°09′58″W	Newark	
149	St. Joseph's Roman Catholic Church Rectory and School	St. Joseph's Roman Catholic Church Rectory and School	December 8, 1980 (#80002486)	W. Market St. 40°44′35″N 74°11′11″W	Newark	
150	St. Lucy's Church	St. Lucy's Church	December 31, 1998 (#98001570)	19-26 Ruggiero Plaza; 40°45′01″N 74°10′36″W	Newark	
151	St. Luke's Church	St. Luke's Church	July 1, 1988 (#86003045)	69 S. Fullerton Ave. 40°48′36″N 74°13′06″W	Montclair	part of the Montclair MRA
152	St. Mark's Episcopal Church	St. Mark's Episcopal Church	September 22, 1977 (#77000868)	13 Main St. 40°46′37″N 74°14′21″W	West Orange	
153	St. Mary's Abbey Church	St. Mary's Abbey Church	November 3, 1972 (#72000790)	High and William Sts. 40°44′09″N 74°17′13″W	Newark	
154	St. Patrick's Pro Cathedral	St. Patrick's Pro Cathedral	November 3, 1972 (#72000791)	Washington St. and Central Ave. 40°44′31″N 74°10′21″W	Newark	
155	St. Rocco's Roman Catholic Church	St. Rocco's Roman Catholic Church	September 29, 1980 (#80002487)	212-216 Hunterdon St. 40°44′15″N 74°11′35″W	Newark	
156	St. Stephan's Church	St. Stephan's Church	October 5, 1972 (#72000792)	Ferry St. and Wilson Ave. 40°43′40″N 74°09′20″W	Newark	
157	Stanley Theater	Stanley Theater	August 28, 1986 (#86001957)	985 S. Orange Ave. 40°44′48″N 74°13′46″W	Newark	
158	State Street Public School	State Street Public School	August 3, 1990 (#90001201)	15 State St. 40°44′56″N 74°10′18″W	Newark	
159	Stone Eagles	Stone Eagles	July 1, 1988 (#86003005)	60 Undercliff Road; 40°48′27″N 74°14′02″W	Montclair	part of the Montclair MRA
160	Stone House by the Stone House Brook	Stone House by the Stone House Brook	November 22, 1991 (#87001333)	219 S. Orange Ave. 40°44′42″N 74°15′13″W	South Orange	Built prior to 1680; expanded into a Queen Anne Victorian in 1877 by William Brewer, Jr.
161	Sydenham House	Sydenham House	July 29, 1970 (#70000384)	Old Road to Bloomfield, at Heller Pkwy. 40°46′36″N 74°10′21″W	Newark	
162	Symington House	Symington House	March 2, 1979 (#79001487)	2 Park Place; 40°44′26″N 74°10′07″W	Newark	
163	Temple B'Nai Abraham	Temple B'Nai Abraham	April 26, 2007 (#07000358)	621 Clinton Ave. 40°43′23″N 74°12′25″W	Newark	
164	Trinity Cathedral	Trinity Cathedral	November 3, 1972 (#72000793)	Broad and Rector Sts. 40°44′25″N 74°10′09″W	Newark	
165	Upper Montclair Station	Upper Montclair Station	June 22, 1984 (#84002673)	275 Bellevue Avenue, Upper Montclair; 40°50′31″N 74°12′35″W	Montclair	part of the Operating Passenger Railroad Stations TR
166	Van Ness House	Van Ness House	July 29, 1977 (#77000862)	236 Little Falls Road; 40°52′59″N 74°15′35″W	Fairfield	
167	Van Reyper-Bond House	Van Reyper-Bond House	January 22, 1979 (#79001483)	848 Valley Rd. 40°51′23″N 74°12′00″W	Montclair	
168	Von Schmid House	Von Schmid House	July 1, 1988 (#86002974)	580 Park St. 40°51′07″N 74°11′49″W	Montclair	part of the Montclair MRA
169	Vreeland Homestead	Vreeland Homestead	October 14, 1994 (#94001217)	216 Chestnut Street; 40°49′09″N 74°10′12″W	Nutley	
170	Ward-Force House and Condit Family Cook House	Ward-Force House and Condit Family Cook House	December 29, 1981 (#81000391)	366 S. Livingston Ave. 40°46′54″N 74°19′00″W	Livingston	
171	Wars of America	Wars of America	October 28, 1994 (#94001257)	Military Park, 614-706 Broad St. 40°44′20″N 74°10′11″W	Newark	part of the Public Sculpture in Newark, New Jersey Multiple Property Submission
172	Watchung Avenue Station	Watchung Avenue Station	June 22, 1984 (#84002674)	Park St. 40°49′46″N 74°12′25″W	Montclair	part of the Operating Passenger Railroad Stations TR
173	Weequahic High School	Weequahic High School	April 11, 2024 (#100010170)	279 Chancellor Avenue; 40°42′33″N 74°13′13″W	Newark	
174	Weequahic Park Historic District	Weequahic Park Historic District	February 12, 2003 (#03000013)	Roughly bounded by Meeker Ave., Dayton St., the Union County border and Maple Ave. 40°42′06″N 74°12′19″W	Newark	
175	Wickcliffe Presbyterian Church	Wickcliffe Presbyterian Church	May 22, 1978 (#78001761)	111 13th Ave. 40°44′19″N 74°11′05″W	Newark	
176	Allyn Wight House	Allyn Wight House	July 1, 1988 (#86003007)	75 Gates Ave. 40°48′25″N 74°13′08″W	Montclair	part of the Montclair MRA
177	Williams-Harrison House	Williams-Harrison House	March 13, 1979 (#79001488)	126 Eagle Rock Ave. 40°49′14″N 74°17′24″W	Roseland	
178	Woman's Club of Upper Montclair	Woman's Club of Upper Montclair	September 4, 2012 (#12000594)	200 Cooper Avenue, Upper Montclair; 40°50′21″N 74°12′24″W	Montclair	part of the Clubhouses of New Jersey Women's Clubs MPS

== Former listings ==
	Name on the Register	Image	Date listed	Date removed	Location	City or town	Description
1	First United Methodist Church		October 26, 1972 (#72000775)	February 17, 1977	227 Market St.	Newark	Demolished in 1977.
2	St. James Church		November 2, 1972 (#72000788)	January 10, 1984	Lafayette and Jefferson Sts.	Newark	Demolished in 1979. Not to be confused with St. James AME Church at High and Court Streets, which remains on the list in Essex County.

== See also ==
- National Register of Historic Places listings in New Jersey
- List of National Historic Landmarks in New Jersey
