= Pan American C.M.A. Church =

Historic church in New Jersey, United States

- U.S. National Register of Historic Places
- New Jersey Register of Historic Places
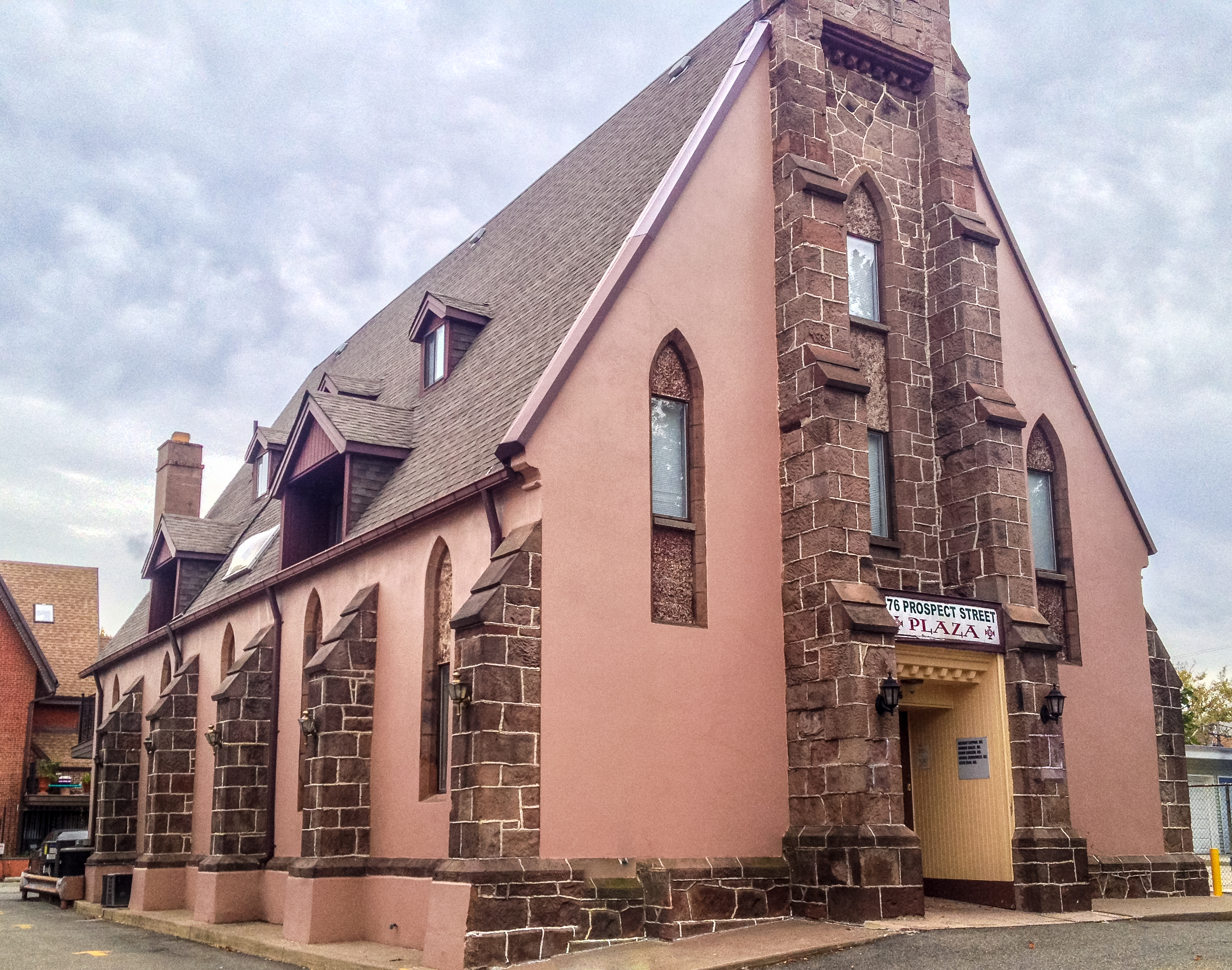

- Location within Essex County, New Jersey Location within New Jersey Location within the United States
- Location: 76 Prospect Street, Newark, New Jersey
- Coordinates: 40°43′48″N 74°9′47″W
- Area: 0 acres (0 ha)
- Built: 1848
- Architects: Wills, Frank
- Architectural style: Gothic Revival
- NRHP reference No.: 72000782
- NJRHP No.
- Added to NRHP: July 31, 1972

Pan American C.M.A. Church (Christ Church) is a historic church at 76 Prospect Street in Newark, Essex County, New Jersey, United States.

It was built in 1848 and added to the National Register of Historic Places in 1972.

== See also ==
- National Register of Historic Places listings in Essex County, New Jersey
