= Short Hills Park Historic District =

Historic district in New Jersey, United States

- U.S. National Register of Historic Places
- U.S. Historic district
- New Jersey Register of Historic Places
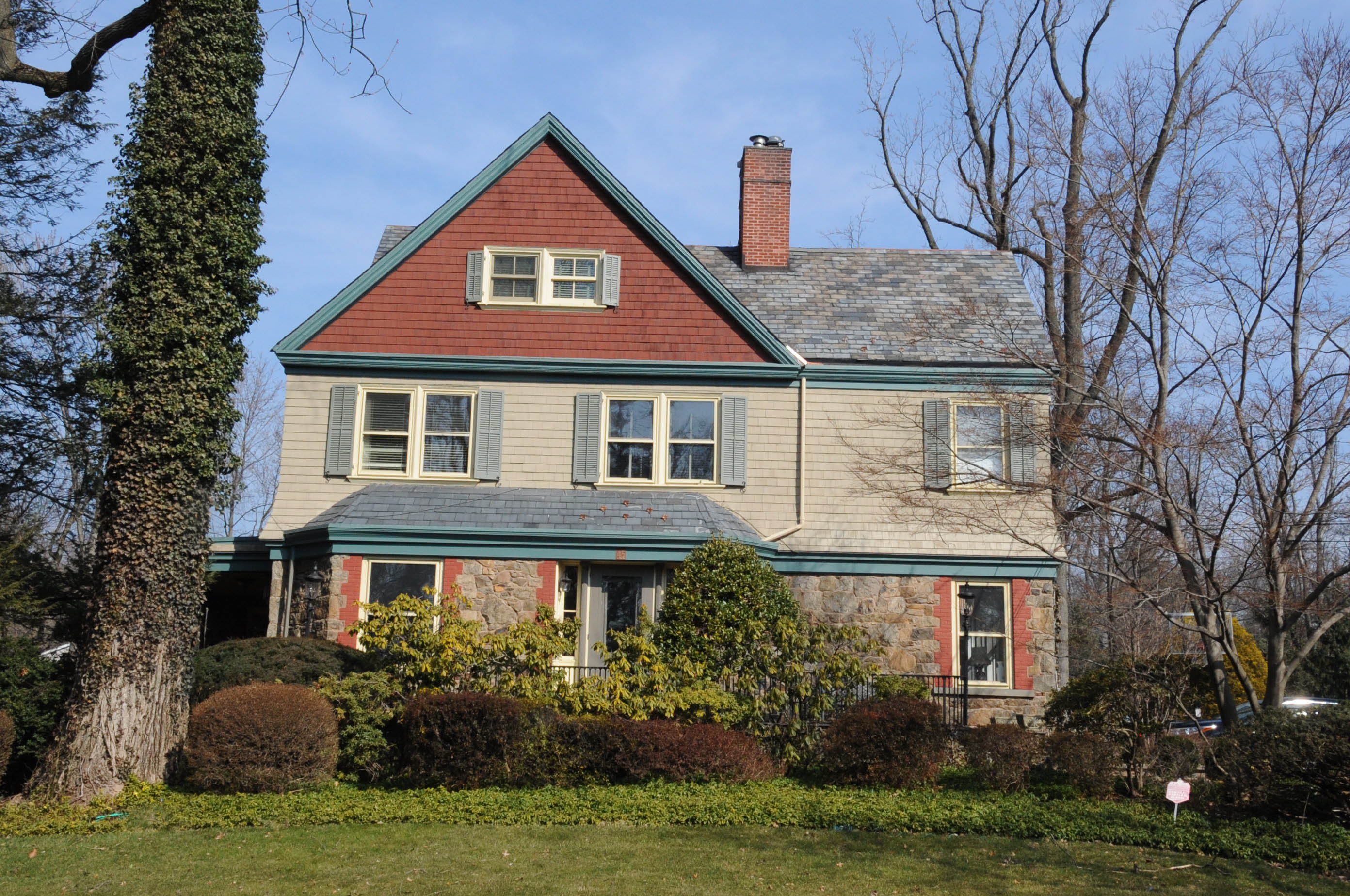

- Location within Essex County, New Jersey Location within New Jersey Location within the United States
- Location: Millburn, NJ
- Nearest city: Summit
- Coordinates: 40°43′30″N 74°19′29″W
- Area: 1,000 acres (400 ha)
- Built: 1877-early 20th centuries
- Architects: M.H. Baillie Scott, Albro & Lindeberg, others
- Architectural style: Queen Anne, Shingle, various contemporary revival styles.
- NRHP reference No.: 80002482
- NJRHP No.: 1097

Significant dates
- Added to NRHP: September 18, 1980
- Designated NJRHP: February 1, 1980

The Short Hills Park historic district is the oldest area of that unincorporated community in Millburn, Essex County, New Jersey, United States. It consists of roughly a thousand acres (4 km^{2}) with 125 buildings, mostly homes, in the area developed earliest by Stewart Hartshorn, whose goal was to create an "ideal town" for living close to nature and the countryside on the 1,550 acres (6.3 km^{2}) he bought in the area in 1877. Many of the streets follow natural contours, and Hartshorn routed them to leave as many trees standing as possible.

It was added to the National Register of Historic Places on September 18, 1980, for its significance in architecture and community planning. Millburn regulates development and redevelopment within it through a special section of its zoning. The average house within the district was valued at over $2 million in 2015.

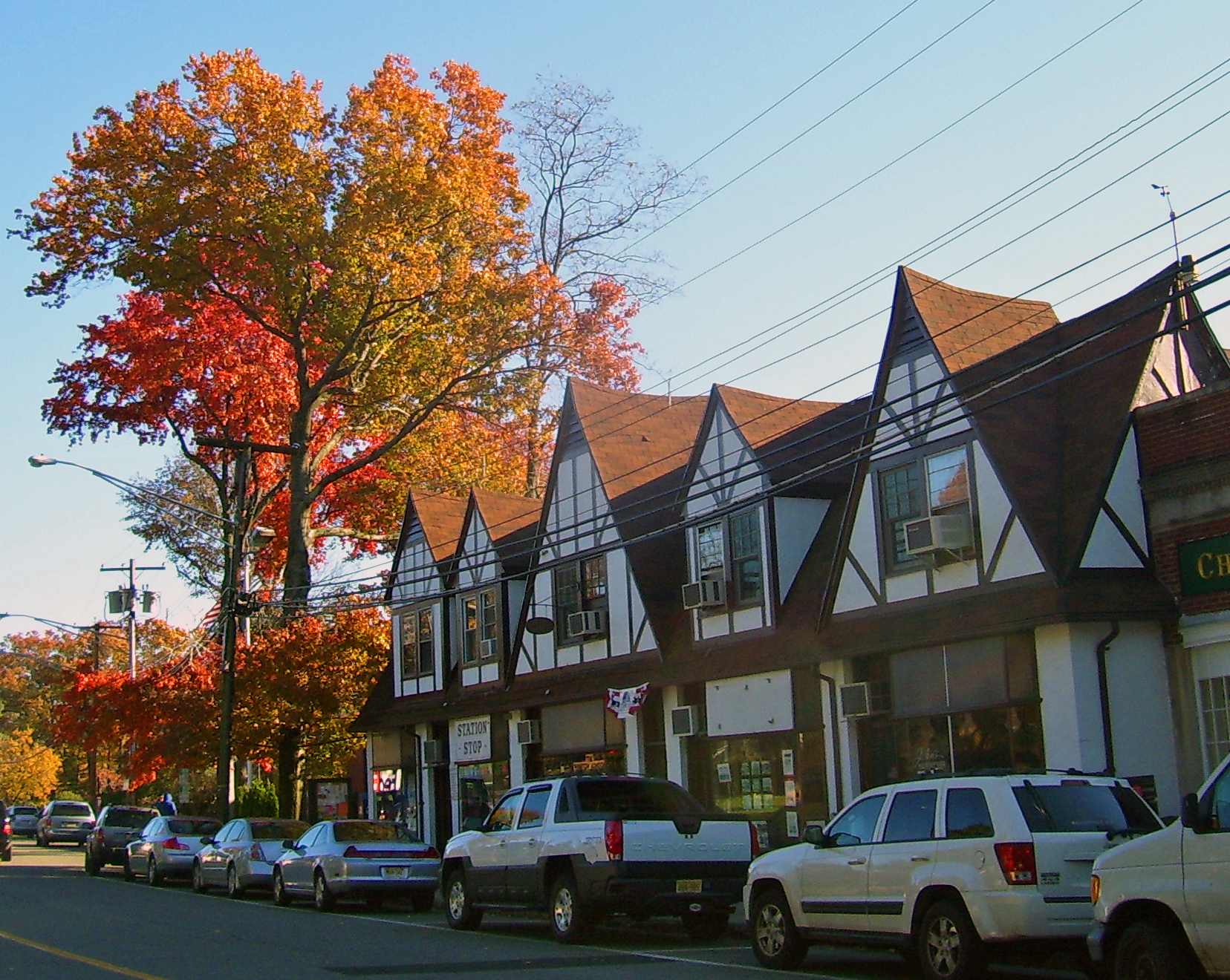
Stores opposite train station in downtown Short Hills, 2007

== See also ==
- National Register of Historic Places listings in Essex County, New Jersey
