= Van Reyper-Bond House =

Historic house in New Jersey, United States

- U.S. National Register of Historic Places
- New Jersey Register of Historic Places
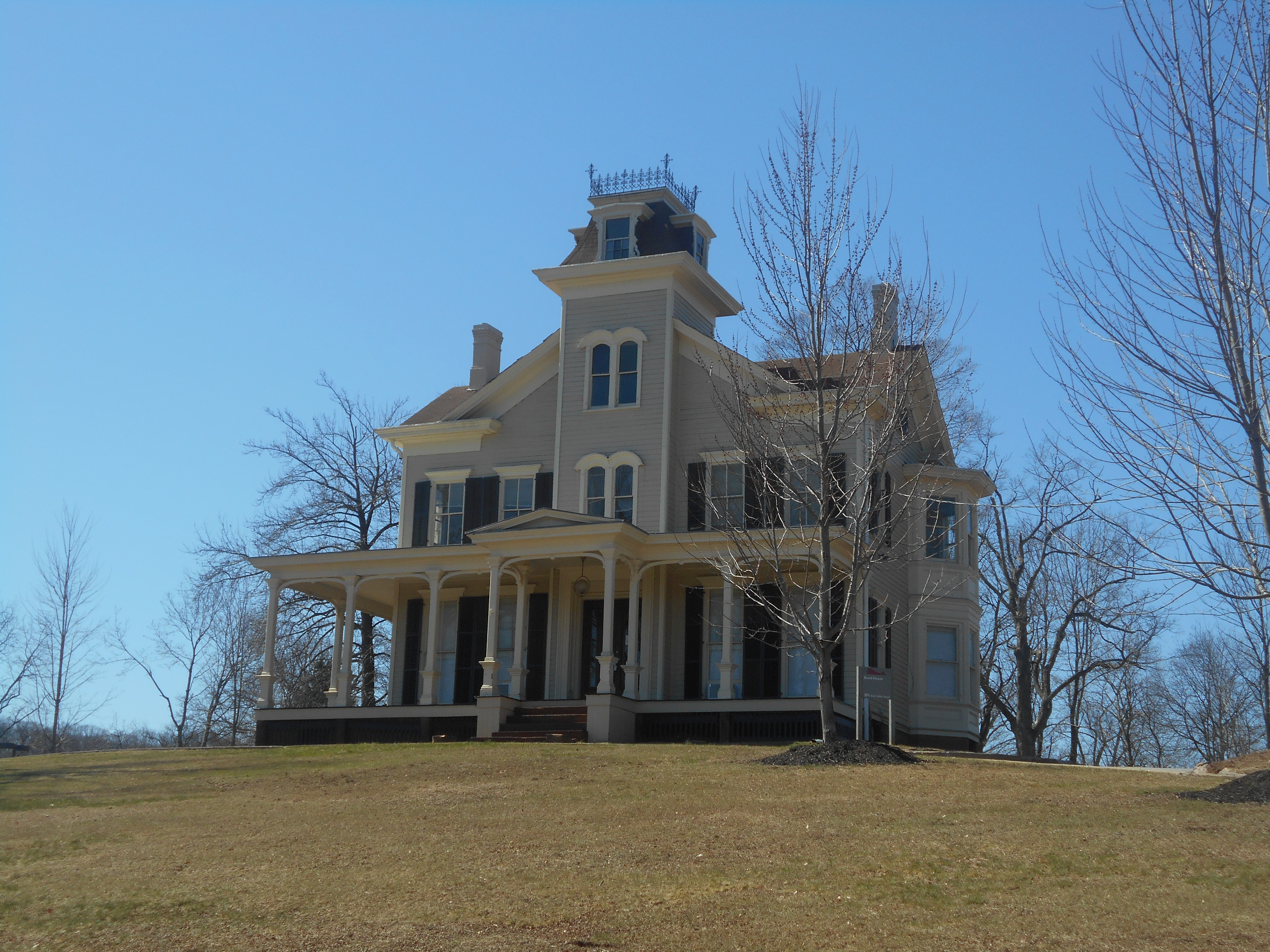
- The Van Reyper-Bond House in April 2014.

- Location within Essex County, New Jersey Location within New Jersey Location within the United States
- Location: 848 Valley Road, Montclair, New Jersey
- Coordinates: 40°51′23″N 74°12′0″W
- Area: 1.4 acres (0.57 ha)
- Built: 1872
- Architect: Thomas C. Van Reyper
- Architectural style: Italianate
- NRHP reference No.: 79001483
- NJRHP No.: 1193

Significant dates
- Added to NRHP: January 22, 1979
- Designated NJRHP: November 27, 1978

Van Reyper-Bond House is located in Montclair, Essex County, New Jersey, United States. The house was built in 1872 and was added to the National Register of Historic Places on January 22, 1979. The house is located on the campus of Montclair State University.

== See also ==
- National Register of Historic Places listings in Essex County, New Jersey
