= Ambrose-Ward Mansion =

Historic house in New Jersey, United States

- U.S. National Register of Historic Places
- New Jersey Register of Historic Places
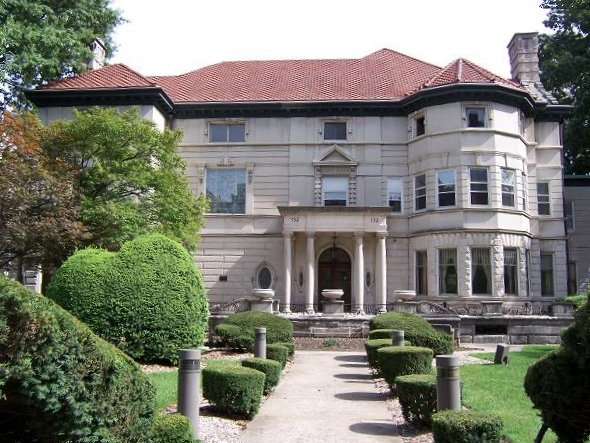

- Location within Essex County, New Jersey Location within New Jersey Location within the United States
- Location: 132 South Harrison Street, East Orange, New Jersey
- Coordinates: 40°45′51″N 74°13′20″W
- Area: 1.2 acres (0.49 ha)
- Built: 1889
- Architectural style: Second Renaissance Revival
- NRHP reference No.: 82003272
- NJRHP No.: 1072

Significant dates
- Added to NRHP: September 20, 1982
- Designated NJRHP: November 6, 1980

Ambrose-Ward Mansion is located in East Orange, Essex County, New Jersey. The mansion was built in 1889 and was added to the National Register of Historic Places on September 20, 1982.

== See also ==
- National Register of Historic Places listings in Essex County, New Jersey
