= Von Schmid House =

Historic house in New Jersey, United States

- U.S. National Register of Historic Places
- New Jersey Register of Historic Places
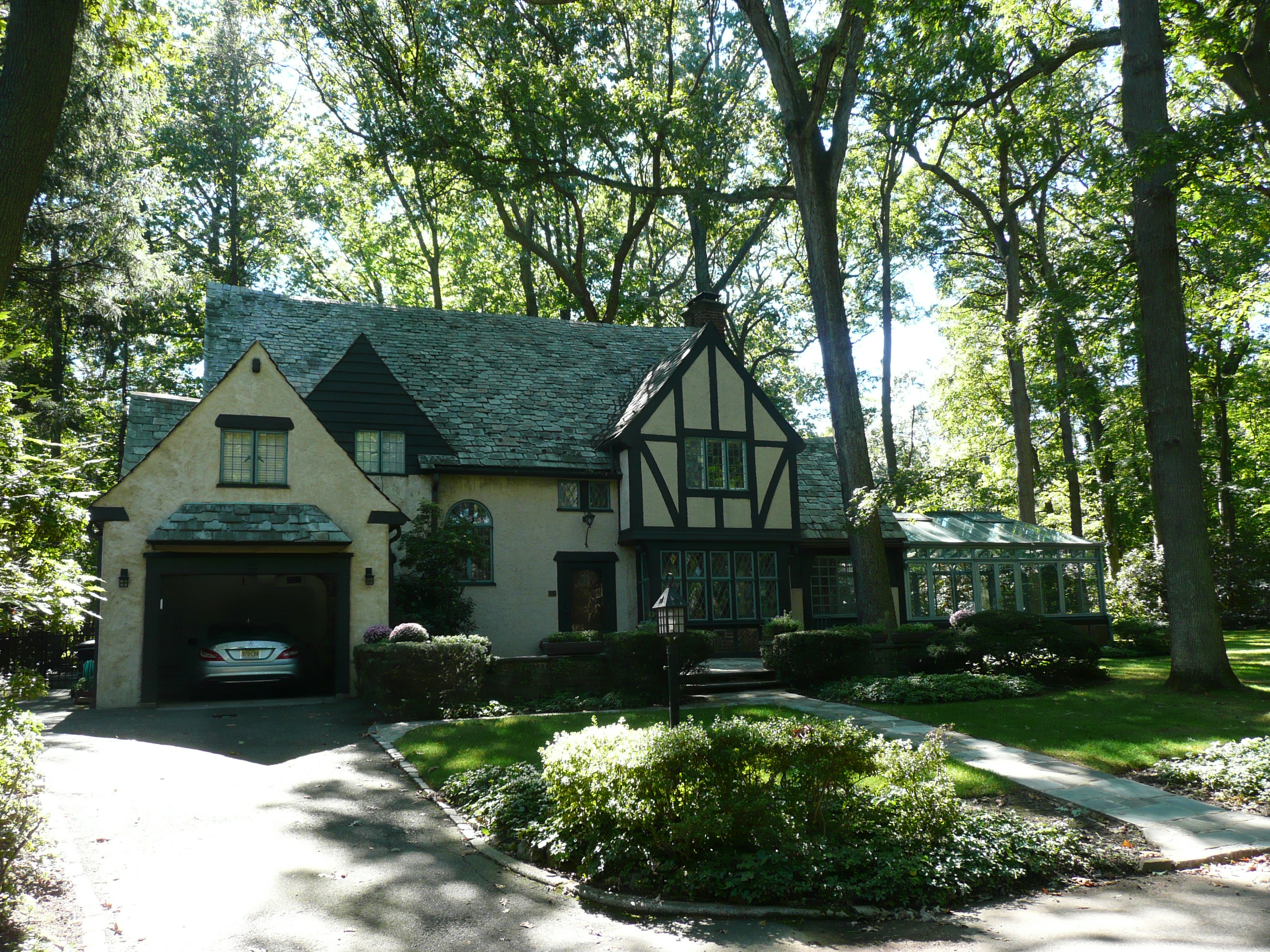

- Location within Essex County, New Jersey Location within New Jersey Location within the United States
- Location: 580 Park Street, Montclair, New Jersey
- Coordinates: 40°51′7″N 74°11′49″W
- Area: less than one acre
- Built: 1926
- Architects: Holmes & Von Schmid
- Architectural style: Tudor Revival, Picturesque Tudor Revival
- MPS: Montclair MRA
- NRHP reference No.: 86002974
- NJRHP No.: 1195

Significant dates
- Added to NRHP: July 1, 1988
- Designated NJRHP: September 29, 1986

Von Schmid House, also known as the Pitha House, is located in Montclair, Essex County, New Jersey, United States. The house was built in 1926 and was added to the National Register of Historic Places on July 1, 1988.

== See also ==
- National Register of Historic Places listings in Essex County, New Jersey
