= St. Rocco's Roman Catholic Church =

Historic church in New Jersey, United States

- U.S. National Register of Historic Places
- New Jersey Register of Historic Places
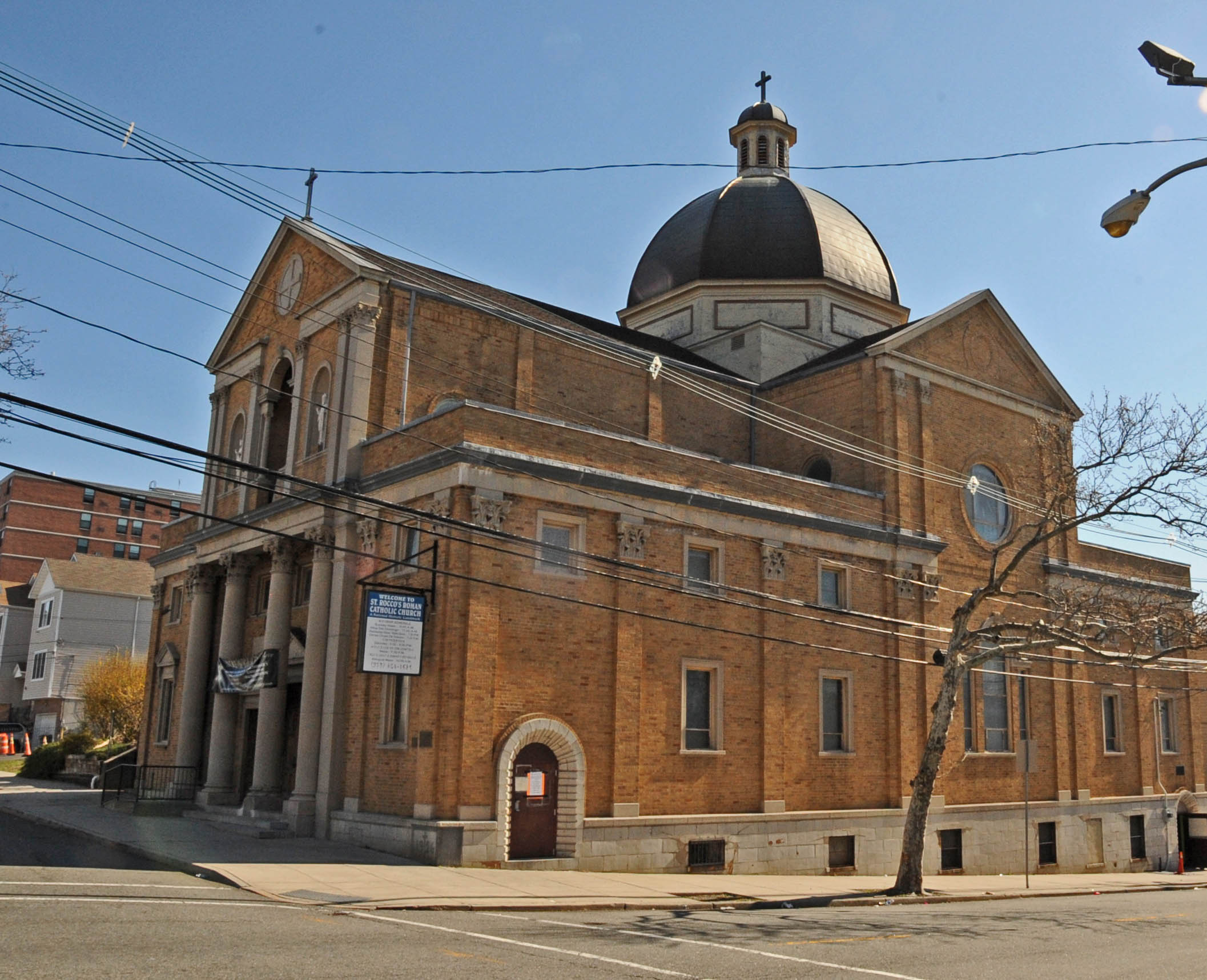
- Church in 2016

- Location within Essex County, New Jersey Location within New Jersey Location within the United States
- Location: 212--216 Hunterdon Street, Newark, New Jersey
- Coordinates: 40°44′15″N 74°11′35″W
- Area: 0.2 acres (0.081 ha)
- Built: Founded on August 5, 1899 when Rev James Zuccarelli was appointed to open a new mission. The cornerstone of the church was laid on March 12, 1900 with the dedication occurring on May 30, 1900. The parish school was founded in 1906.
- Architects: Convery, Neil J.
- Architectural style: Italian/Mediterranean
- NRHP reference No.: 80002487
- NJRHP No.
- Added to NRHP: September 29, 1980

St. Rocco's Roman Catholic Church is a historic Roman Catholic parish church located within the Archdiocese of Newark at 212—216 Hunterdon Street in Newark, Essex County, New Jersey, United States.

== History ==
St. Rocco's (Italian) Roman Catholic Church was founded on August 5, 1899, when Rev James Zuccarelli was appointed to open a new mission. The cornerstone of the church was laid on March 12, 1900, with the dedication occurring on May 30, 1900. The parish school was founded in 1906. It was added to the National Register in 1980.

== See also ==
- National Register of Historic Places listings in Essex County, New Jersey
