= Cliffside Hose Company No. 4 =

Historic firehouse in New Jersey, United States

- U.S. National Register of Historic Places
- New Jersey Register of Historic Places
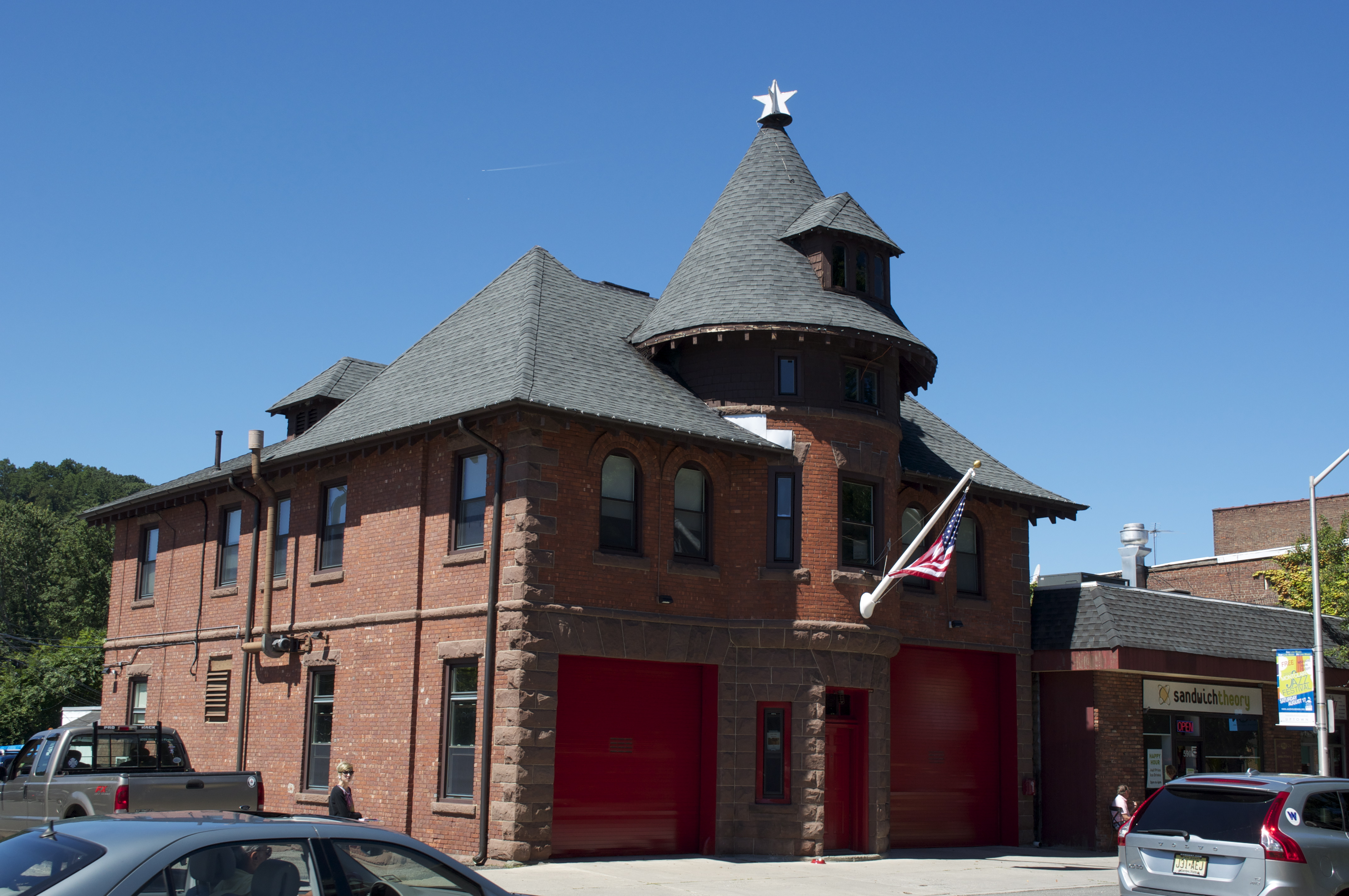

- Location within Essex County, New Jersey Location within New Jersey Location within the United States
- Location: 588 Valley Road, Montclair, New Jersey
- Coordinates: 40°50′24″N 74°12′34″W
- Area: less than one acre
- Built: 1901
- Architect: Effingham R. North
- Architectural style: Queen Anne
- MPS: Montclair MRA
- NRHP reference No.: 86003077
- NJRHP No.: 1115

Significant dates
- Added to NRHP: July 1, 1988
- Designated NJRHP: September 29, 1986

The Cliffside Hose Company No. 4, is located in Montclair, Essex County, New Jersey, United States. The firehouse was built in 1901 and added to the National Register of Historic Places on July 1, 1988. The firehouse was built to protect the north end of Montclair and currently houses Montclair Fire Department's Engine 2 and Truck 2.

== See also ==
- National Register of Historic Places listings in Essex County, New Jersey
