= Glencoe (Newark, New Jersey) =

Historic house in New Jersey, United States

- U.S. National Register of Historic Places
- New Jersey Register of Historic Places
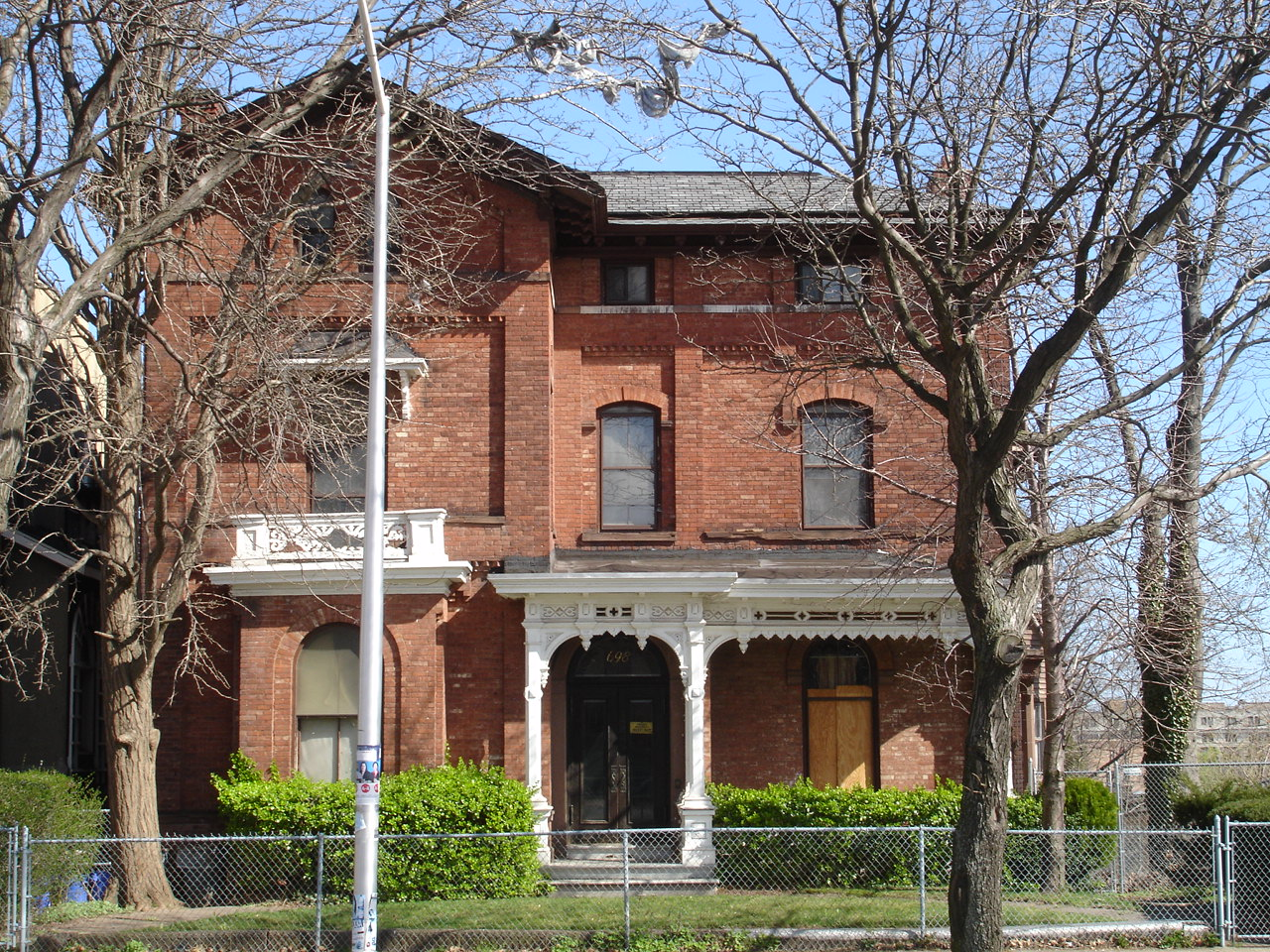
- The Glencoe Mansion in spring 2012

- Location within Essex County, New Jersey Location within New Jersey Location within the United States
- Location: 698 Martin Luther King Boulevard, Newark, New Jersey
- Coordinates: 40°43′42″N 74°10′56″W
- Area: 0.5 acres (0.20 ha)
- Built: 1871
- Architectural style: Italianate
- NRHP reference No.: 91001481
- NJRHP No.: 1260

Significant dates
- Added to NRHP: October 1, 1991
- Designated NJRHP: August 16, 1991

Glencoe, also known as Coe Mansion, is located in Newark, Essex County, New Jersey, United States. The building was built in 1871 and was added to the National Register of Historic Places on October 1, 1991.

== See also ==
- National Register of Historic Places listings in Essex County, New Jersey
