= New Point Baptist Church =

Historic church in New Jersey, United States

- U.S. National Register of Historic Places
- New Jersey Register of Historic Places
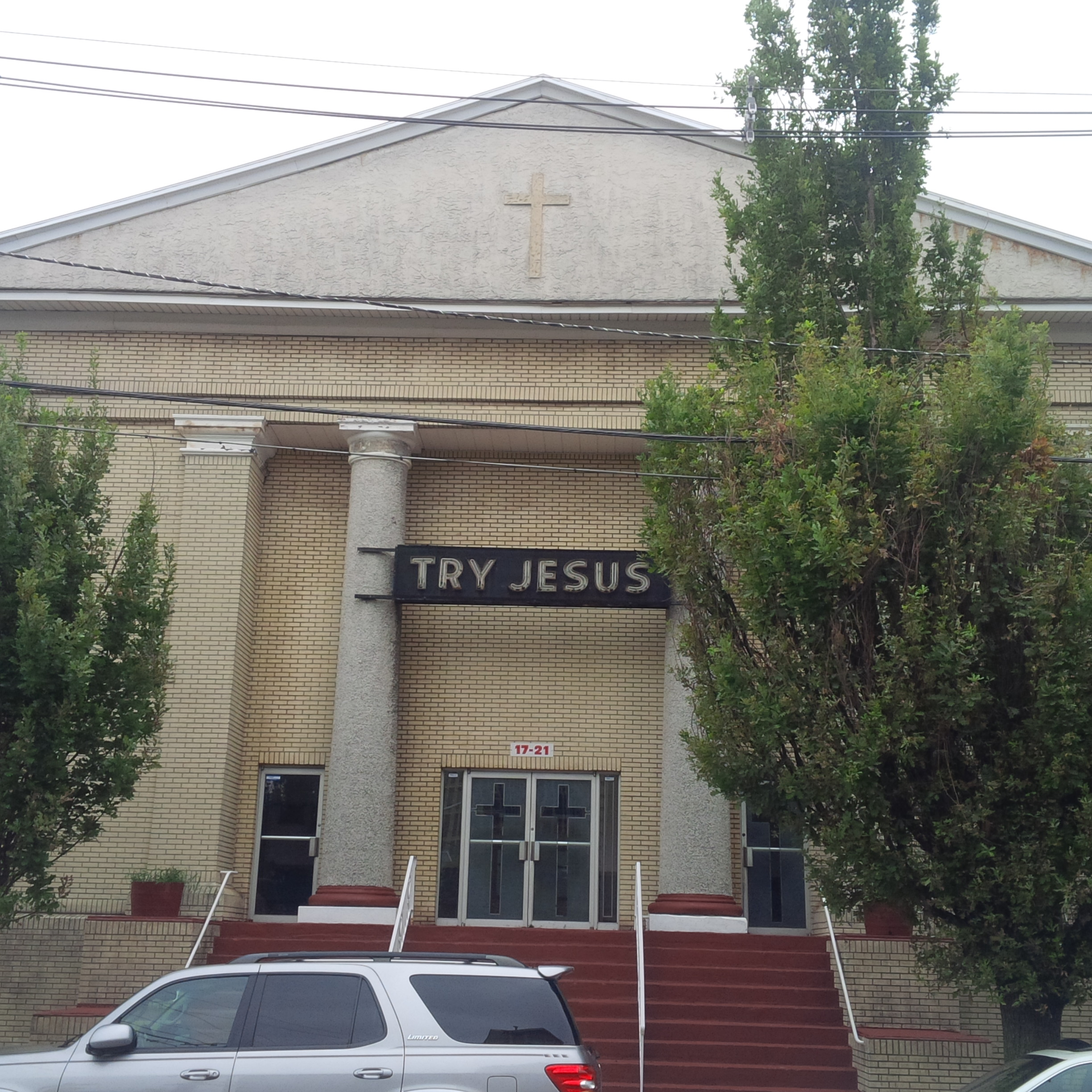

- Location within Essex County, New Jersey Location within New Jersey Location within the United States
- Location: 17 E. Kinney Street, Newark, New Jersey
- Coordinates: 40°43′41″N 74°10′32″W
- Area: 1 acre (0.40 ha)
- Built: 1849
- Architects: Hall, John G.; Gendell, David S.
- Architectural style: Greek Revival
- NRHP reference No.: 72000779
- NJRHP No.
- Added to NRHP: November 02, 1972

New Point Baptist Church is a historic church at 17 E. Kinney Street in Newark, Essex County, New Jersey, United States.

It was built in 1849 and added to the National Register of Historic Places in 1972.

== See also ==
- National Register of Historic Places listings in Essex County, New Jersey
