= Haskell's Bloomfield Villa =

Historic house in New Jersey, United States

- U.S. National Register of Historic Places
- New Jersey Register of Historic Places
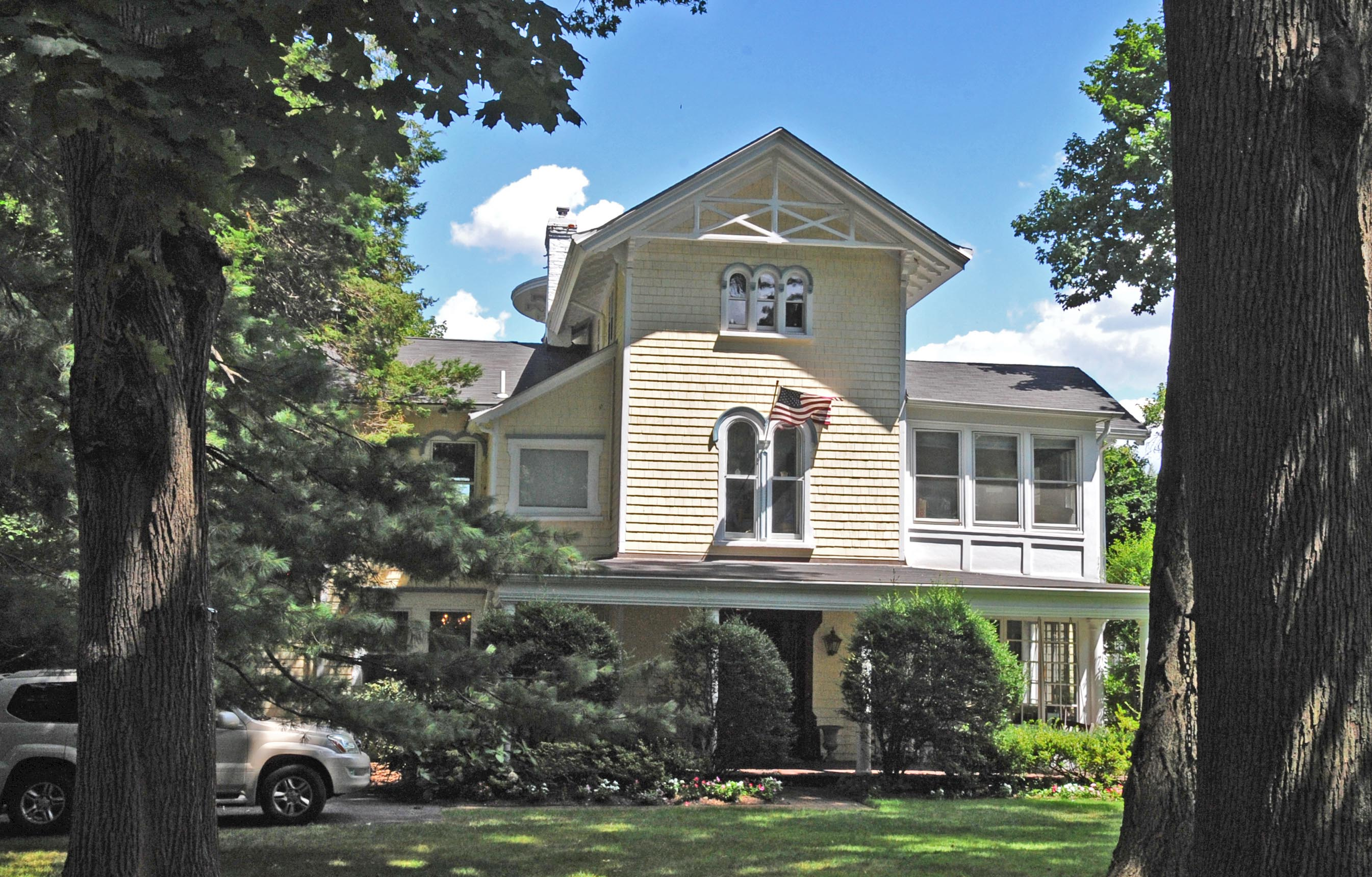
- House in 2015

- Location within Essex County, New Jersey Location within New Jersey Location within the United States
- Location: 84 Llewellyn Road, Montclair, New Jersey
- Coordinates: 40°48′16″N 74°13′35″W
- Area: less than one acre
- Built: 1859
- Architect: Andrew J. Davis
- Architectural style: Italianate, Italianate
- MPS: Montclair MRA
- NRHP reference No.: 86003002
- NJRHP No.: 1133

Significant dates
- Added to NRHP: July 1, 1988
- Designated NJRHP: September 29, 1986

Haskell's Bloomfield Villa, also known as the Humphreys House, is located in Montclair, Essex County, New Jersey, United States. The house was built in 1859 and was added to the National Register of Historic Places on July 1, 1988.

== See also ==
- National Register of Historic Places listings in Essex County, New Jersey
