= Bradner's Pharmacy =

- U.S. National Register of Historic Places
- New Jersey Register of Historic Places
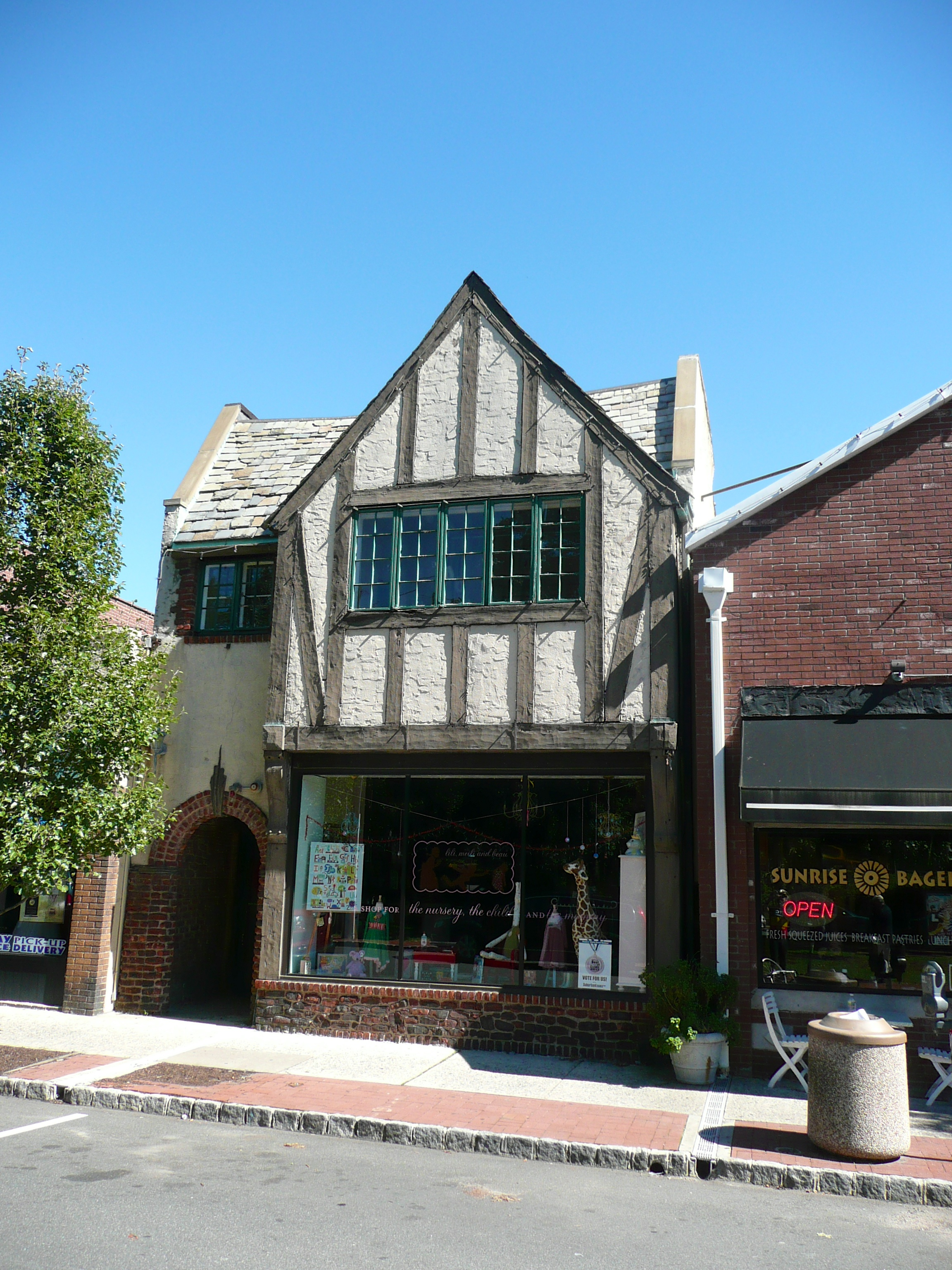

- Location within Essex County, New Jersey Location within New Jersey Location within the United States
- Location: 33 Watchung Plaza, Montclair, New Jersey
- Coordinates: 40°49′48″N 74°12′21″W
- Area: less than one acre
- Built: 1926
- Architect: Arthur Ramhurst
- Architectural style: Tudor Revival
- MPS: Montclair MRA
- NRHP reference No.: 86003010
- NJRHP No.: 1199

Significant dates
- Added to NRHP: July 1, 1988
- Designated NJRHP: September 29, 1986

Bradner's Pharmacy is located in Montclair, Essex County, New Jersey, United States. The building was built in 1926 and was added to the National Register of Historic Places on July 1, 1988.

== See also ==
- National Register of Historic Places listings in Essex County, New Jersey
