= Canfield-Morgan House =

Historic house in New Jersey, United States

- U.S. National Register of Historic Places
- New Jersey Register of Historic Places
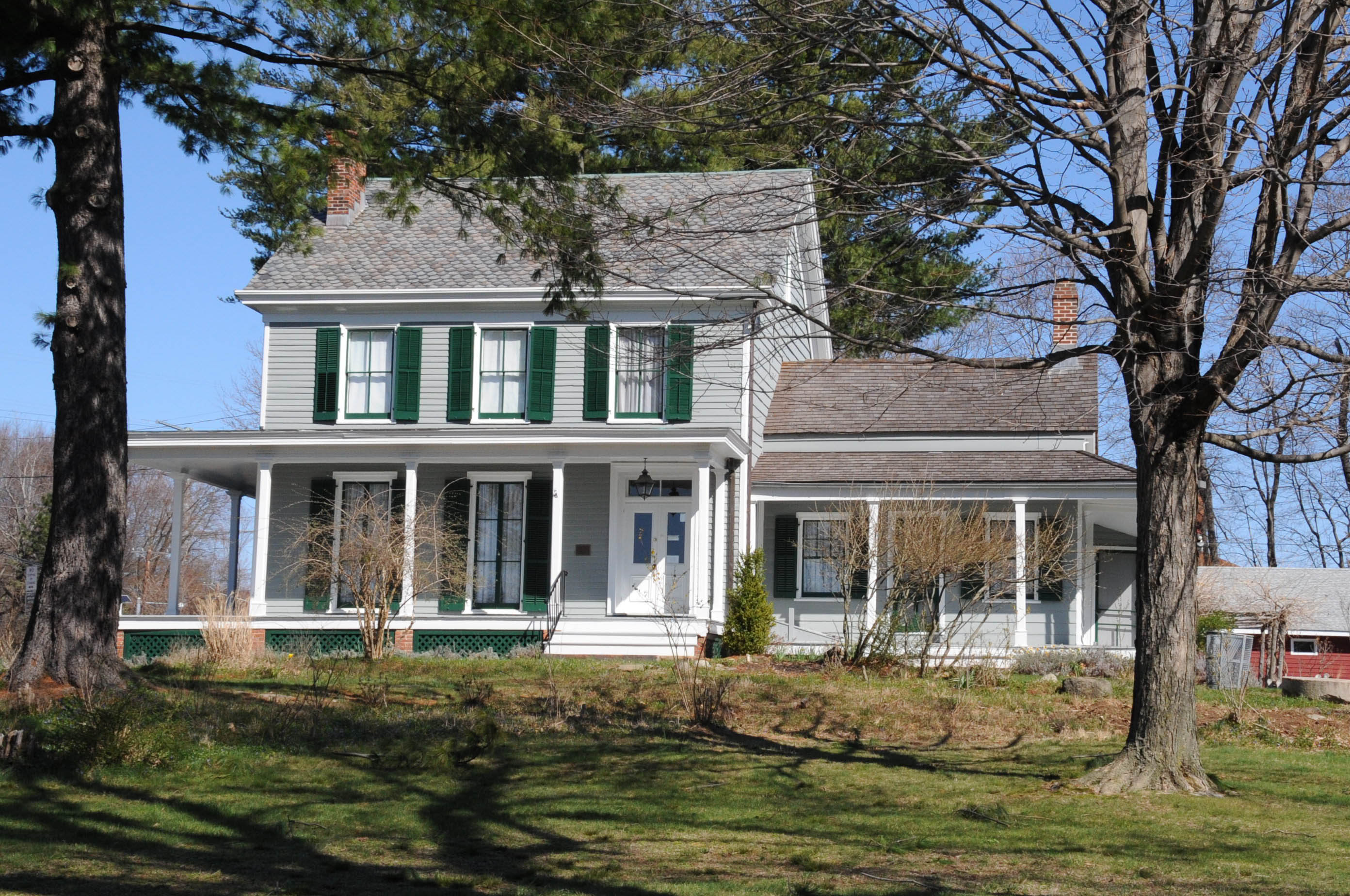

- Location within Essex County, New Jersey Location within New Jersey Location within the United States
- Location: 899-903 Pompton Avenue (NJ 23), Cedar Grove, New Jersey
- Coordinates: 40°51′48″N 74°13′56″W
- Area: 16.5 acres (6.7 ha)
- Built: 1845
- Architectural style: Mid 19th Century Revival
- NRHP reference No.: 95001265
- NJRHP No.: 2814

Significant dates
- Added to NRHP: November 7, 1995
- Designated NJRHP: September 21, 1995

Canfield-Morgan House, is located in Cedar Grove, Essex County, New Jersey, United States. The building was built in 1845 and was added to the National Register of Historic Places on November 7, 1995.

== See also ==
- National Register of Historic Places listings in Essex County, New Jersey
