= Stone Eagles =

Historic house in New Jersey, United States

- U.S. National Register of Historic Places
- New Jersey Register of Historic Places
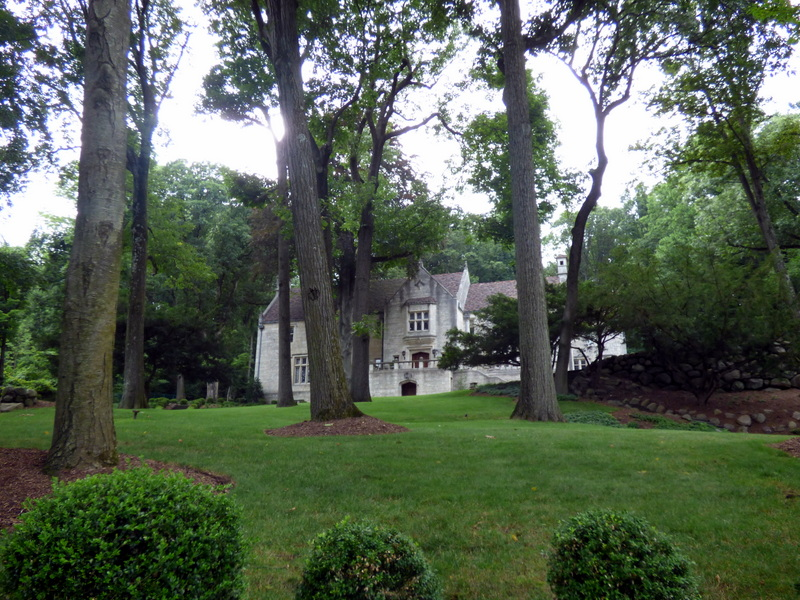
- Stone Eagles in July, 2014

- Location within Essex County, New Jersey Location within New Jersey Location within the United States
- Location: 60 Undercliff Road, Montclair, New Jersey
- Coordinates: 40°48′27″N 74°14′02″W
- Area: 2.7 acres (1.1 ha)
- Built: 1929
- Architect: Goodwillie and Moran; Olmsted Brothers
- Architectural style: Tudor Revival, English Manor House
- MPS: Montclair MRA
- NRHP reference No.: 86003005
- NJRHP No.: 1184

Significant dates
- Added to NRHP: July 1, 1988
- Designated NJRHP: September 29, 1986

Stone Eagles, also known as the Mochary House, is located at 60 Undercliff Road in the township of Montclair in Essex County, New Jersey, United States. The house was built in 1929 and was added to the National Register of Historic Places on July 1, 1988, for its significance in architecture. It was listed in the Buildings by Prominent Architects section of the Historic Resources of Montclair Multiple Property Submission (MPS).

== History and description ==
The two and one-half stone English Manor house was built in 1929 for William H. Eshbaugh, a stock broker. It was designed by the architects Goodwillie and Moran. The landscape design was done by the Olmsted Brothers.

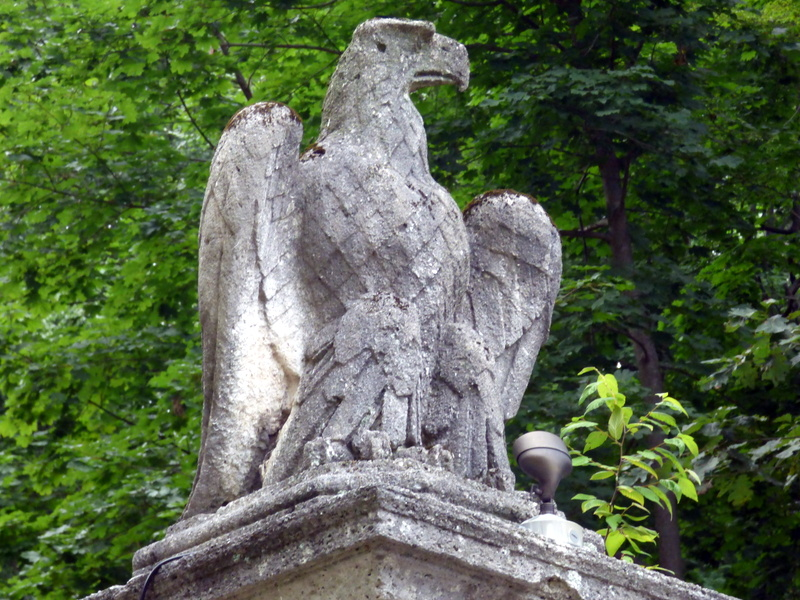
An eagle sculpture on the grounds.

== See also ==
- National Register of Historic Places listings in Essex County, New Jersey
