= Jacobus House =

Historic house in New Jersey, United States

- U.S. National Register of Historic Places
- New Jersey Register of Historic Places
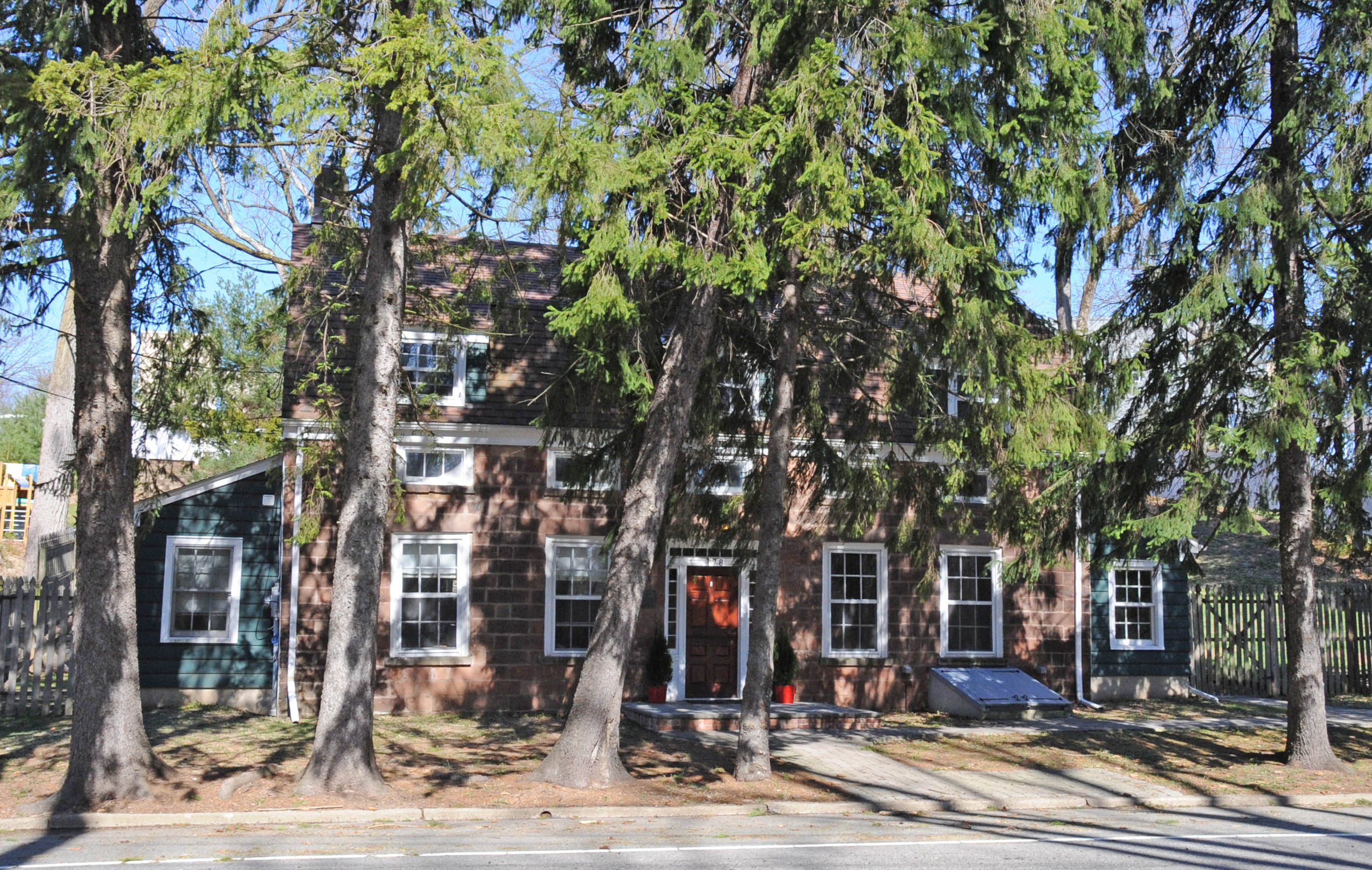

- Location within Essex County, New Jersey Location within New Jersey Location within the United States
- Location: 178 Grove Avenue, Cedar Grove, New Jersey
- Coordinates: 40°51′3″N 74°14′4″W
- Area: less than one acre
- Built: 1725
- Architectural style: Dutch Colonial
- NRHP reference No.: 75001133
- NJRHP No.: 1071

Significant dates
- Added to NRHP: April 1, 1975
- Designated NJRHP: December 10, 1974

The Jacobus House is located in Cedar Grove, Essex County, New Jersey, United States. The house was built in 1725 and was added to the National Register of Historic Places on April 1, 1975.

== See also ==
- National Register of Historic Places listings in Essex County, New Jersey
