= Red Gables =

Historic house in New Jersey, United States

- U.S. National Register of Historic Places
- New Jersey Register of Historic Places
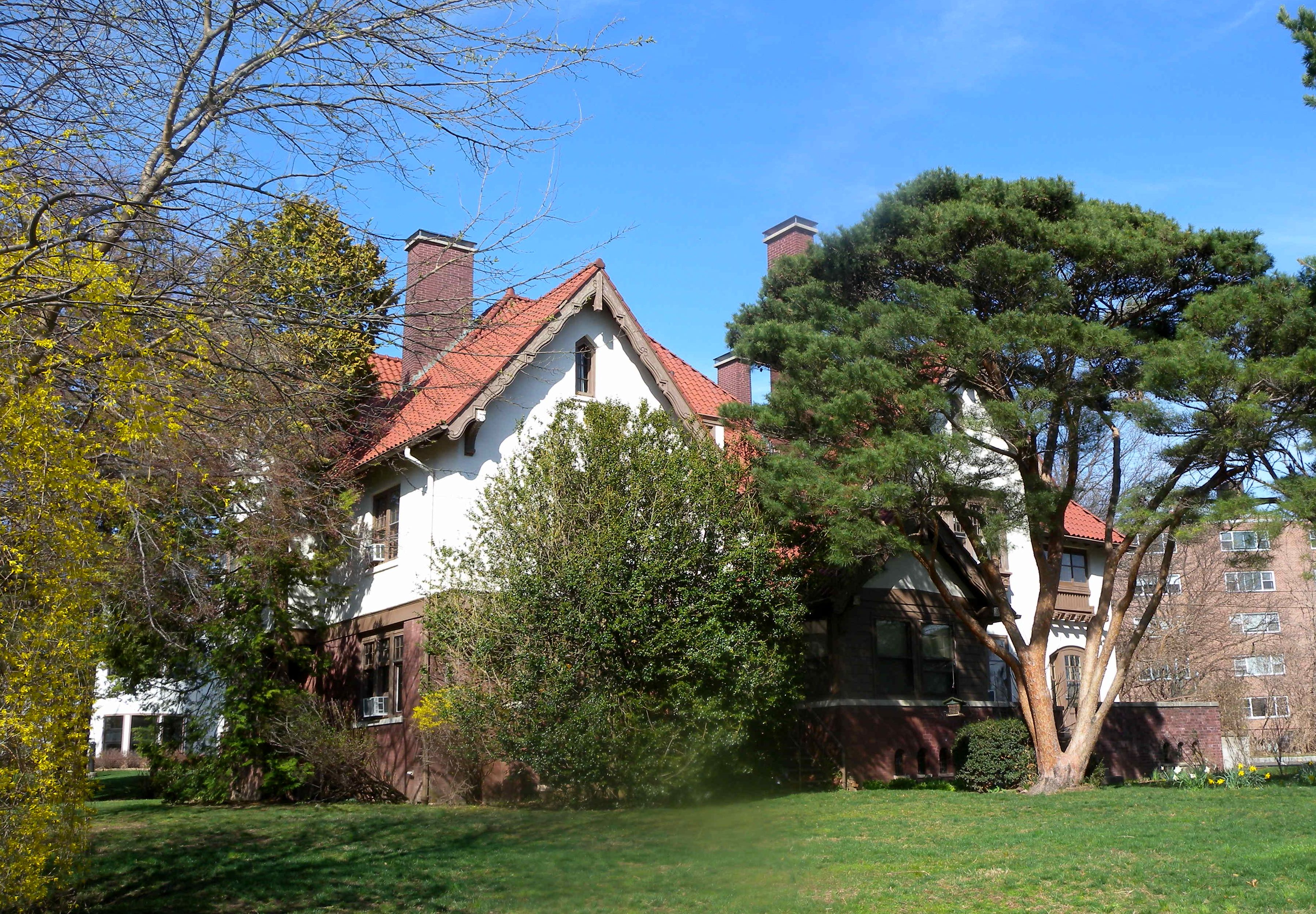

- Location within Essex County, New Jersey Location within New Jersey Location within the United States
- Location: 99 South Fullerton Avenue, Montclair, New Jersey
- Coordinates: 40°48′29″N 74°13′8″W
- Area: 1.5 acres (0.61 ha)
- Built: 1906
- Architects: Lang, Francis Rand
- Architectural style: Romantic
- MPS: Montclair MRA
- NRHP reference No.: 86002992
- NJRHP No.: 1173

Significant dates
- Added to NRHP: July 1, 1988
- Designated NJRHP: September 29, 1986

Red Gables, also known as the Yard School of Art, is located in Montclair, Essex County, New Jersey, United States. The house was built in 1906 and was added to the National Register of Historic Places on July 1, 1988. Next to it is the synagogue Bnai Keshet.

== See also ==
- National Register of Historic Places listings in Essex County, New Jersey
