= State Street Public School =

- U.S. National Register of Historic Places
- New Jersey Register of Historic Places
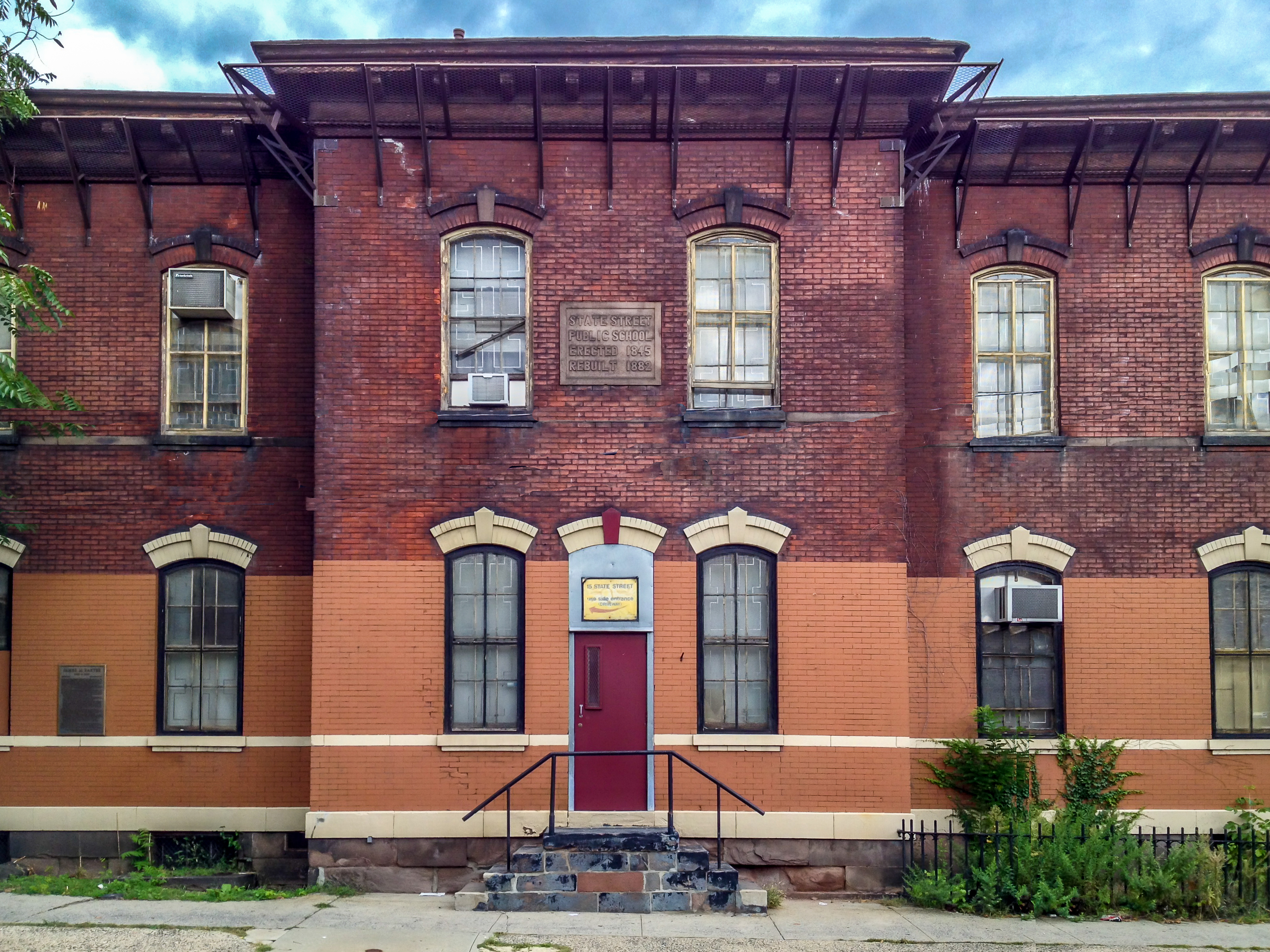

- Location within Essex County, New Jersey Location within New Jersey Location within the United States
- Location: 15 State Street, Newark, New Jersey
- Coordinates: 40°44′54″N 74°10′18″W
- Area: 0.3 acres (0.12 ha)
- Built: 1845
- Architectural style: Italianate
- NRHP reference No.: 90001201
- NJRHP No.: 1328

Significant dates
- Added to NRHP: August 3, 1990
- Designated NJRHP: January 9, 1990

State Street Public School, is located in Newark, Essex County, New Jersey, United States. The building was built in 1845 and was added to the National Register of Historic Places on August 3, 1990. It is now the Audio-Video Division of the Newark Public Schools.

== See also ==
- National Register of Historic Places listings in Essex County, New Jersey
