= Enclosure Historic District =

Historic district in New Jersey, United States

- U.S. National Register of Historic Places
- U.S. Historic district
- New Jersey Register of Historic Places
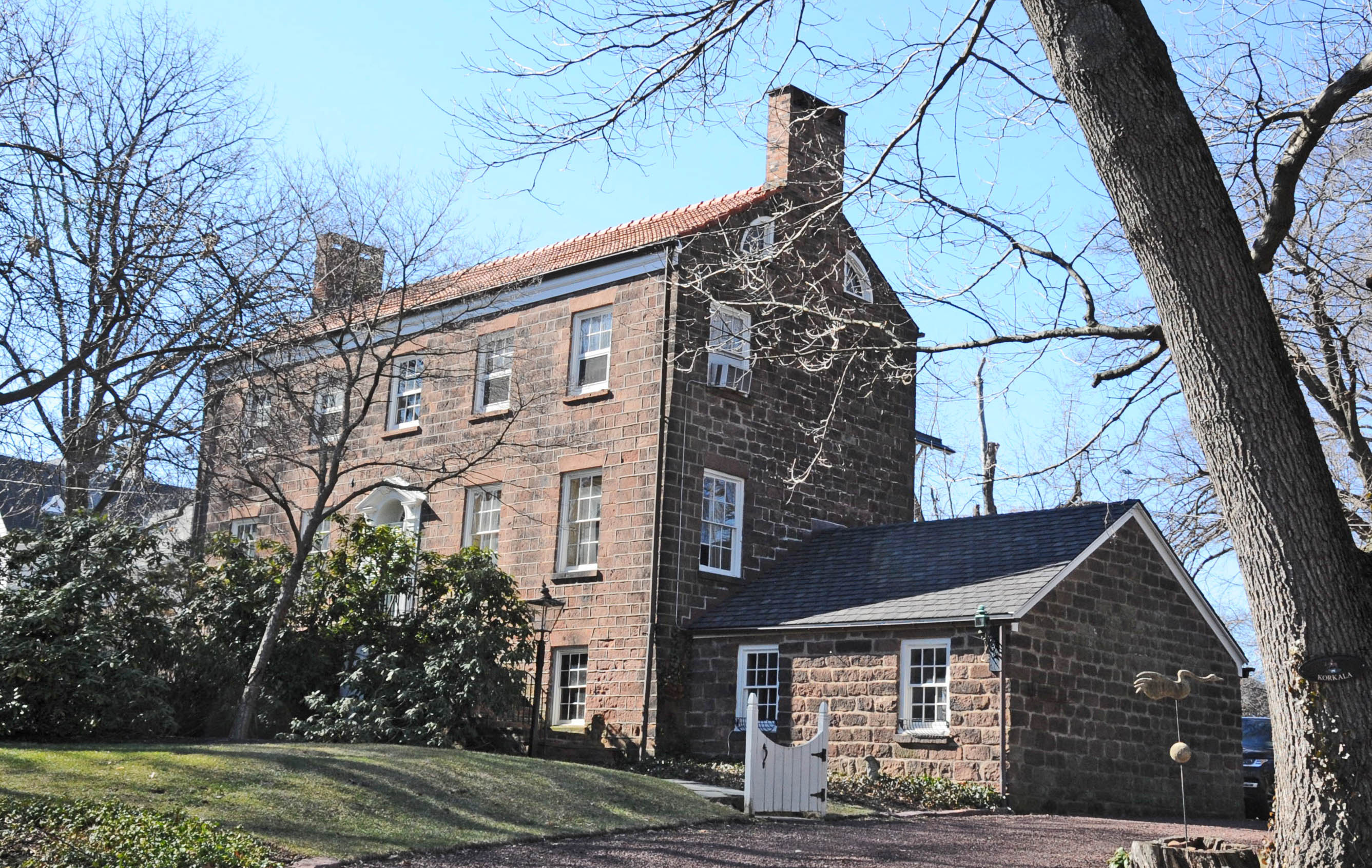

- Location within Essex County, New Jersey Location within New Jersey Location within the United States
- Location: Enclosure and Calico Lane, Nutley, New Jersey
- Coordinates: 40°49′11″N 74°9′16″W
- Area: 8 acres (3.2 ha)
- Built: 1812
- Architects: Von Strom, Barron
- Architectural style: Greek Revival, Italianate, Queen Anne
- NRHP reference No.: 74001160
- NJRHP No.: 1348

Significant dates
- Added to NRHP: December 31, 1974
- Designated NJRHP: July 1, 1974

Enclosure Historic District is a historic district located in Nutley, Essex County, New Jersey, United States. The buildings in the district were built in 1812 and were added to the National Register of Historic Places on December 31, 1974.

== See also ==
- National Register of Historic Places listings in Essex County, New Jersey
