= Second Reformed Dutch Church =

Historic church in New Jersey, United States

- U.S. National Register of Historic Places
- New Jersey Register of Historic Places
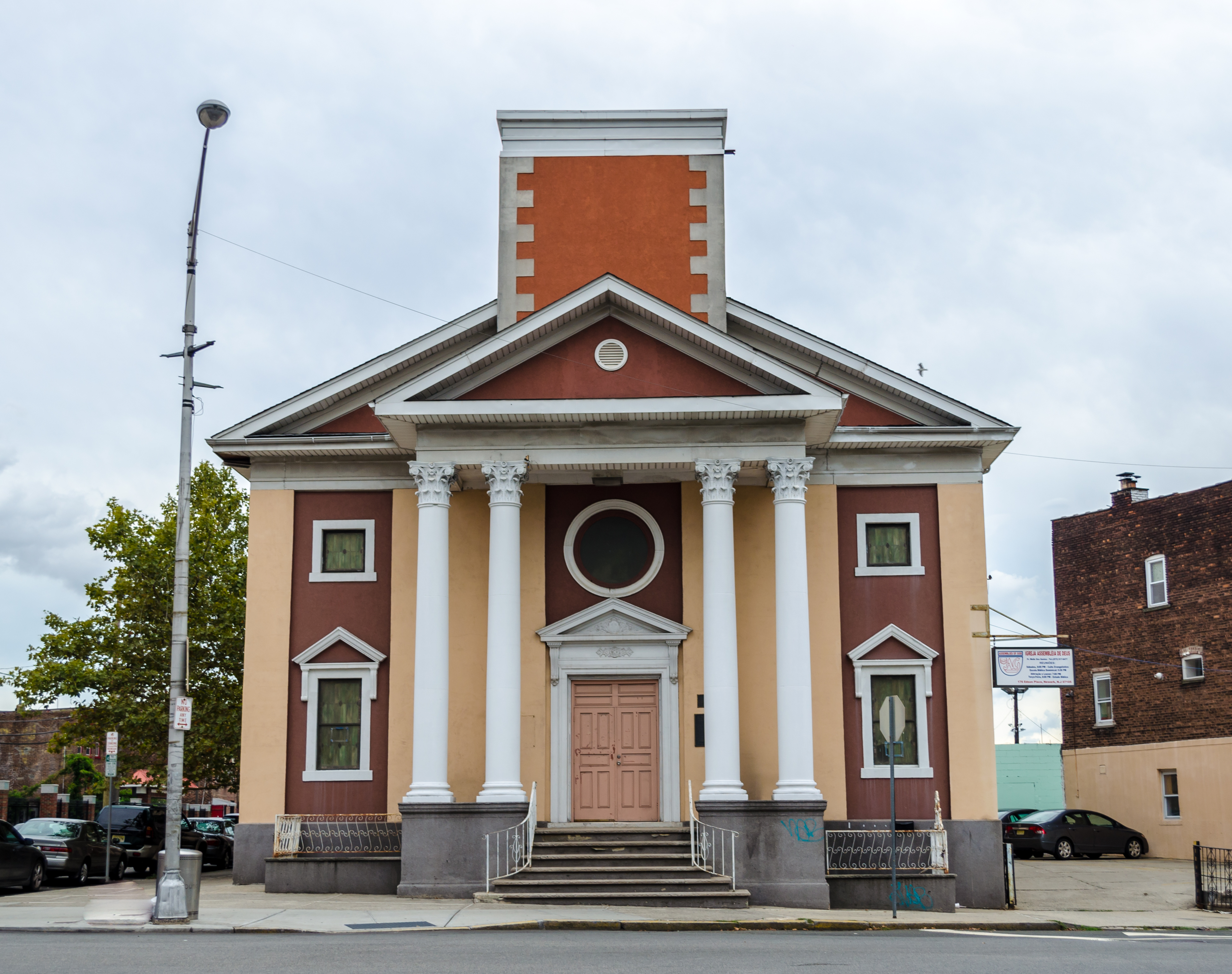

- Location within Essex County, New Jersey Location within New Jersey Location within the United States
- Location: 178-184 Edison Place, Newark, New Jersey
- Coordinates: 40°43′57″N 74°9′51″W
- Area: 1 acre (0.40 ha)
- Built: 1848
- Architects: Kirk, William
- Architectural style: Greek Revival
- NRHP reference No.: 79001486
- NJRHP No.
- Added to NRHP: March 07, 1979

Second Reformed Dutch Church (also known as Mt. Carmel Roman Catholic Church; Ironbound Educational and Igreja Assembleia de deus) is a historic church building at 178-184 Edison Place in Newark, Essex County, New Jersey, United States.

It was built in 1848 originally for a Dutch Reformed congregation. The building added to the National Register of Historic Places in 1979. It has been home to several other congregations since its founding, including Igreja Assembleia de deus, an Assemblies of God congregation led by Pastor Welbr DosSantos, who is the first missionary sent from Assembleia de Deus, Belo Horizonte, Brasil to the USA.

== See also ==
- National Register of Historic Places listings in Essex County, New Jersey
