= Pine Street Historic District (Montclair, New Jersey) =

- U.S. National Register of Historic Places
- U.S. Historic district
- New Jersey Register of Historic Places
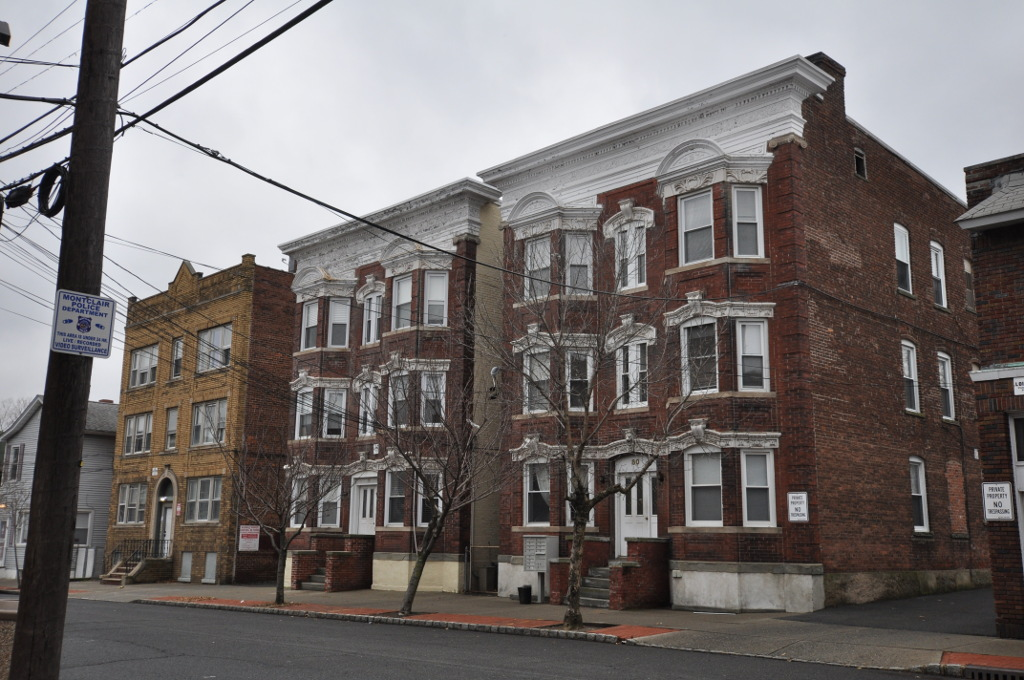
- 70, 78, and 80 Pine Street

- Location within Essex County, New Jersey Location within New Jersey Location within the United States
- Location: Roughly bounded by Glenridge Avenue, the NJ TRANSIT Boonton Line, Pine and Baldwin Streets; Montclair, New Jersey
- Coordinates: 40°48′35″N 74°12′28″W
- Area: 26.6 acres (10.8 ha)
- Architect: Anthony Holmes; Anthony DePace
- Architectural style: Late 19th And 20th Century Revivals, Late 19th And Early 20th Century American Movements
- NRHP reference No.: 00000175
- NJRHP No.: 1560

Significant dates
- Added to NRHP: March 16, 2000
- Designated NJRHP: January 13, 2000

The Pine Street Historic District is a 26.6-acre (10.8 ha) historic district encompassing a residential section of the township of Montclair and extending into the borough of Glen Ridge, both in Essex County, New Jersey. Its approximate boundaries are Glenridge Avenue, the NJ TRANSIT Boonton Line, Pine and Baldwin Streets. The district, also known as the Montclair Working Class Housing Historic District, was added to the National Register of Historic Places on March 16, 2000 for its significance in architecture and social history. The district includes 107 contributing buildings.

== History and description ==
The district contains many three and four-story brick buildings that were built between 1880 and the 1930s and feature Classical and Italianate architecture. The three-story buff brick multi-family residence at 70 Pine Street was built around 1924 and features Classical Revival architecture. The three-story red brick residential buildings at 78 and 80 Pine Street were built around 1912 and feature Renaissance Revival architecture. The house at 17 Grant Street was built around 1890 and was documented by the Historic American Buildings Survey (HABS) in 1996.

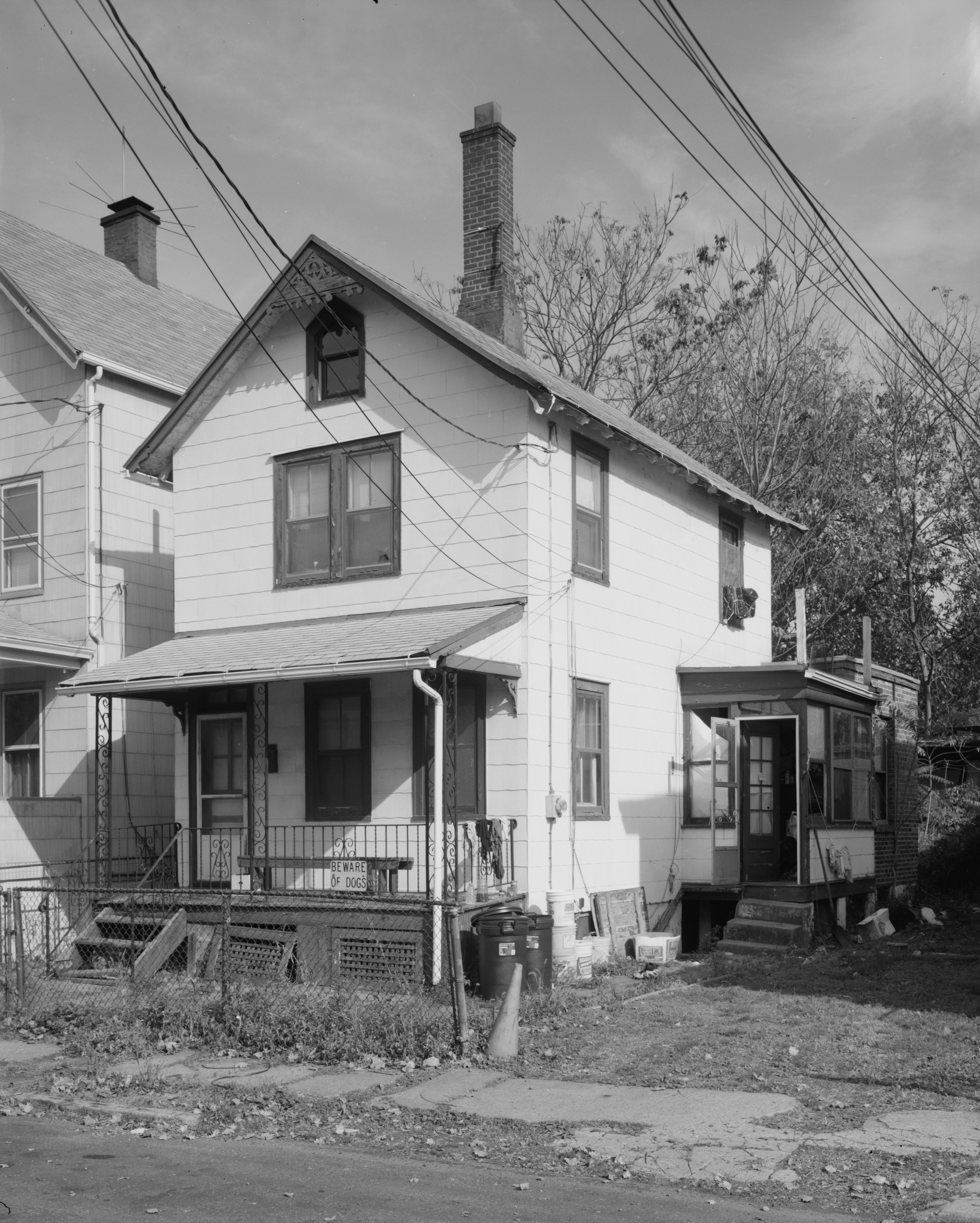
HABS photo from 1996 of 17 Grant Street

== See also ==
- National Register of Historic Places listings in Essex County, New Jersey
