= Samuel Orton Harrison House =

Historic house in New Jersey, United States

- U.S. National Register of Historic Places
- New Jersey Register of Historic Places
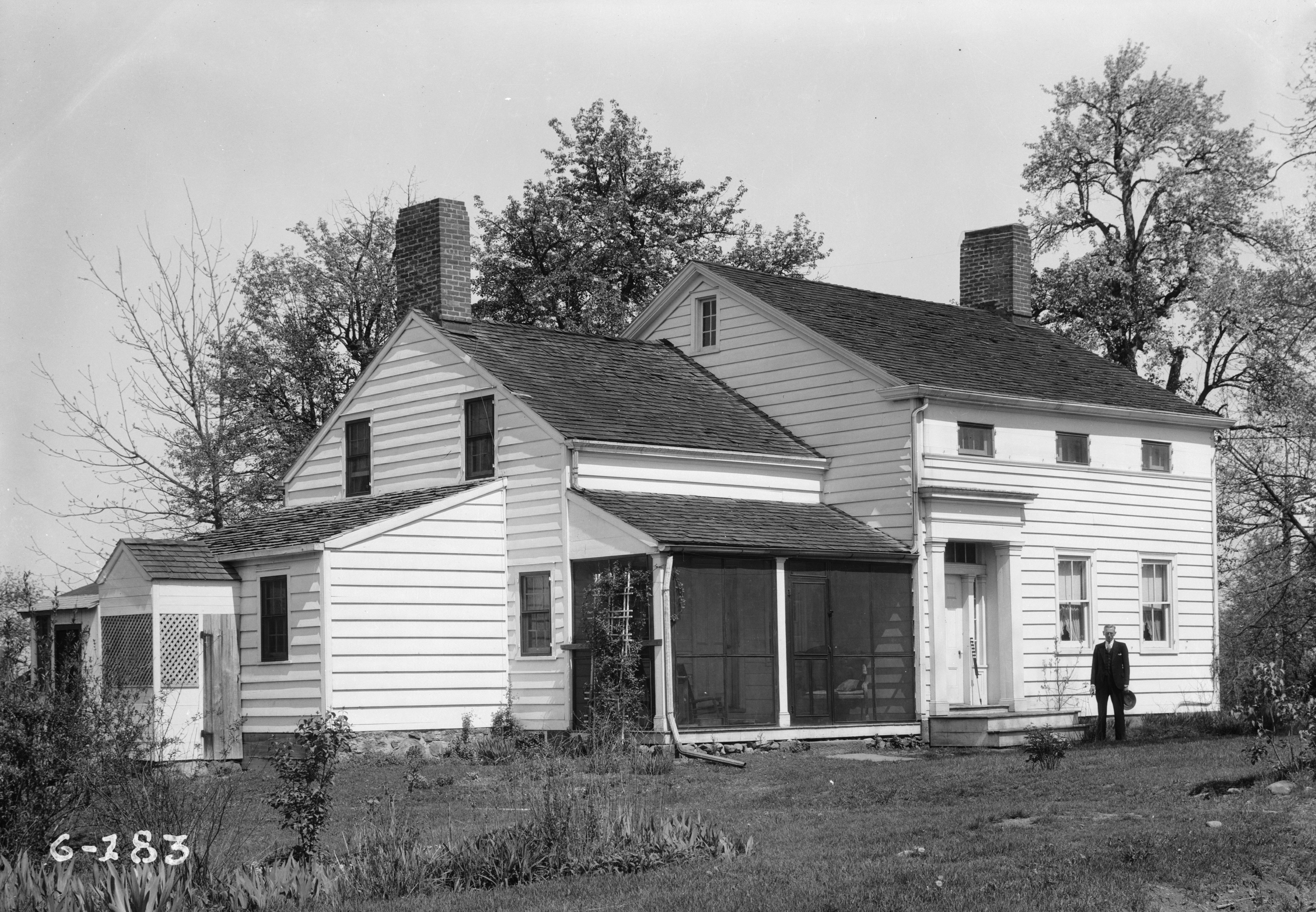
- Samuel Orton Harrison House in 1937

- Location within Essex County, New Jersey
- Location: 153 Orton Road West Caldwell, New Jersey
- Coordinates: 40°49′50″N 74°18′15″W
- NRHP reference No.: 80002488
- NJRHP No.: 1365

Significant dates
- Added to NRHP: June 30, 1980
- Designated NJRHP: October 26, 1979

The Samuel Orton Harrison House, located in West Caldwell, Essex County, New Jersey, United States, was listed in the Historic American Buildings Survey (1937) as significantly representative of Greek Revival architectural style. It was built between 1830 and 1840 and remained in possession of Mrs. Hannah Harrison until 1946 when the property was sold to historic preservationist Raymond Dey. At the time of sale the structure was virtually unchanged from its initial build. Dey subsequently performed renovations and minor alterations to the first floor plan to enable continued use as a private residence. Under subsequent ownership the house was placed on the National Register of Historic Places on October 26, 1979.

== See also ==
- National Register of Historic Places listings in Essex County, New Jersey
