= North Reformed Church =

Historic church in New Jersey, United States

- U.S. National Register of Historic Places
- New Jersey Register of Historic Places
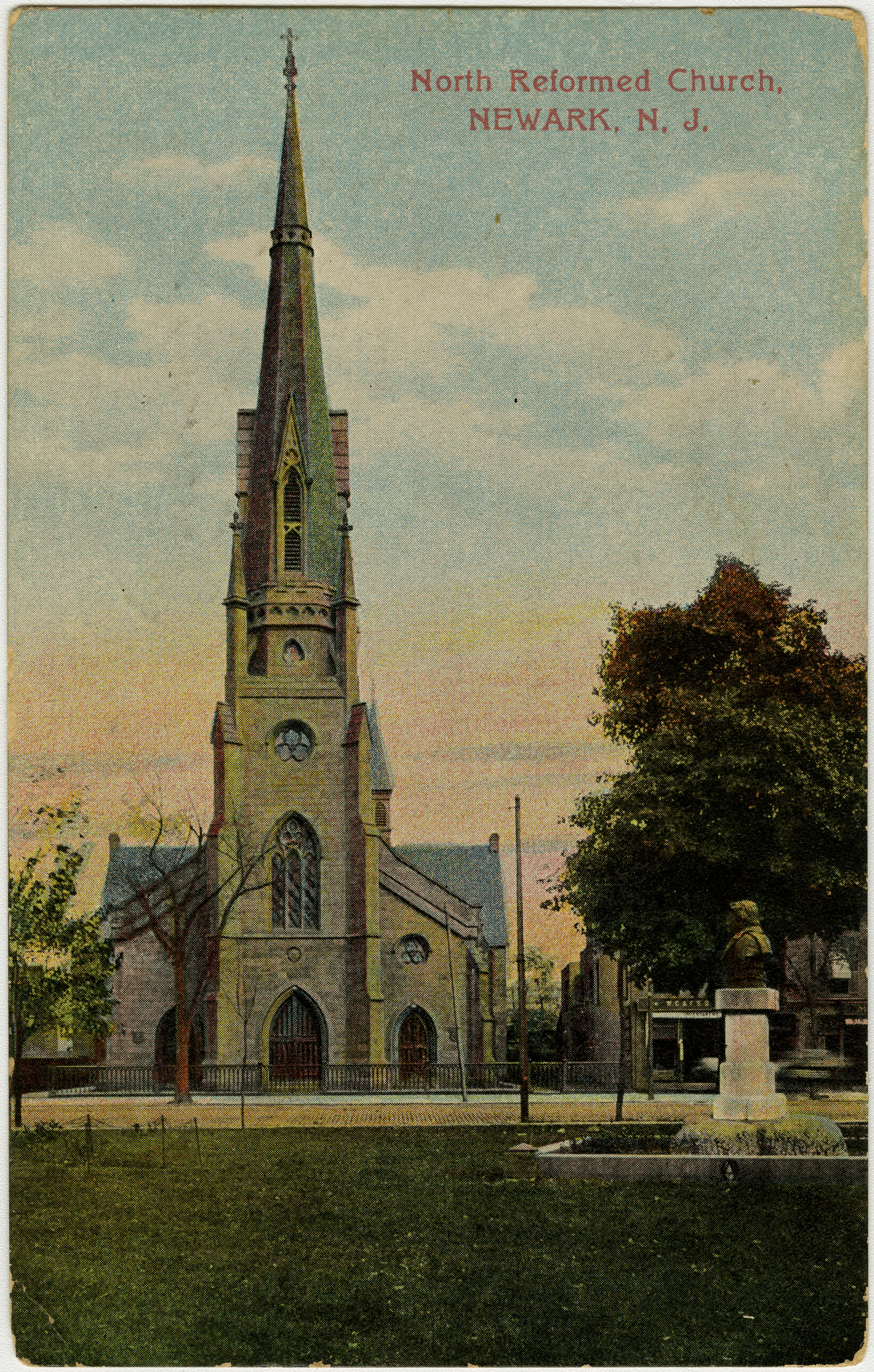
- Early 20th century

- Location within Essex County, New Jersey Location within New Jersey Location within the United States
- Location: 510 Broad St., Newark, New Jersey
- Coordinates: 40°44′39″N 74°10′10″W
- Area: 1 acre (0.40 ha)
- Built: 1857
- Architects: Kirk, William H.
- Architectural style: Gothic
- NRHP reference No.: 72000780
- NJRHP No.
- Added to NRHP: October 05, 1972

North Reformed Church is a historic church located at 510 Broad Street in Newark, Essex County, New Jersey, United States.

The congregation was founded in 1856 and the church building was constructed in 1857. Its spire reaches 165 ft (50 m)

The building was added to the National Register of Historic Places in 1972.

== See also ==
- National Register of Historic Places listings in Essex County, New Jersey
