= Hotel Montclair =

Hotel in Montclair, New Jersey

Coordinates: 40.82641°N 74.227238°W

- Interactive map of the Hotel Montclair area

General information
- Location: Crestmont Road and Claremont Avenue, Montclair, New Jersey
- Opening: May 1, 1907
- Closed: 1938

Other information
- Number of rooms: 228

The Hotel Montclair, also known as The Montclair was a hotel located in Montclair, New Jersey. It opened in 1907 and closed in 1938.

== Building ==
The Hotel Montclair was located above Montclair on Crestmont Road on the First Mountain at the border with Verona. It was accessible by trolley, carriage, and automobile, and a joint horse riding and automobile club was opened in association with the hotel. There were originally 128 rooms, expanded in 1920 to 228. Its amenities included a sunroom, an artesian well, and in later years an English grill and taproom.

== History ==
Opened on May 1, 1907, the hotel catered primarily to long-term summer guests, among them John Franklin Fort, a governor of the state. On June 28, 1913, the dedication of Montclair's fourth Delaware and Lackawanna station was celebrated there. Paul Wilcox, a lawyer also instrumental in the founding of the nearby Montclair Golf Club, played a major role in its establishment and was its manager. After the repeal of Prohibition in 1933, alcoholic beverages were made available in the hotel.

Thirty years after its opening, the Hotel Montclair closed in 1938, and was razed in 1940; the Rockcliffe Apartments were built on the site in 1940.
