= Van Vleck House and Gardens =

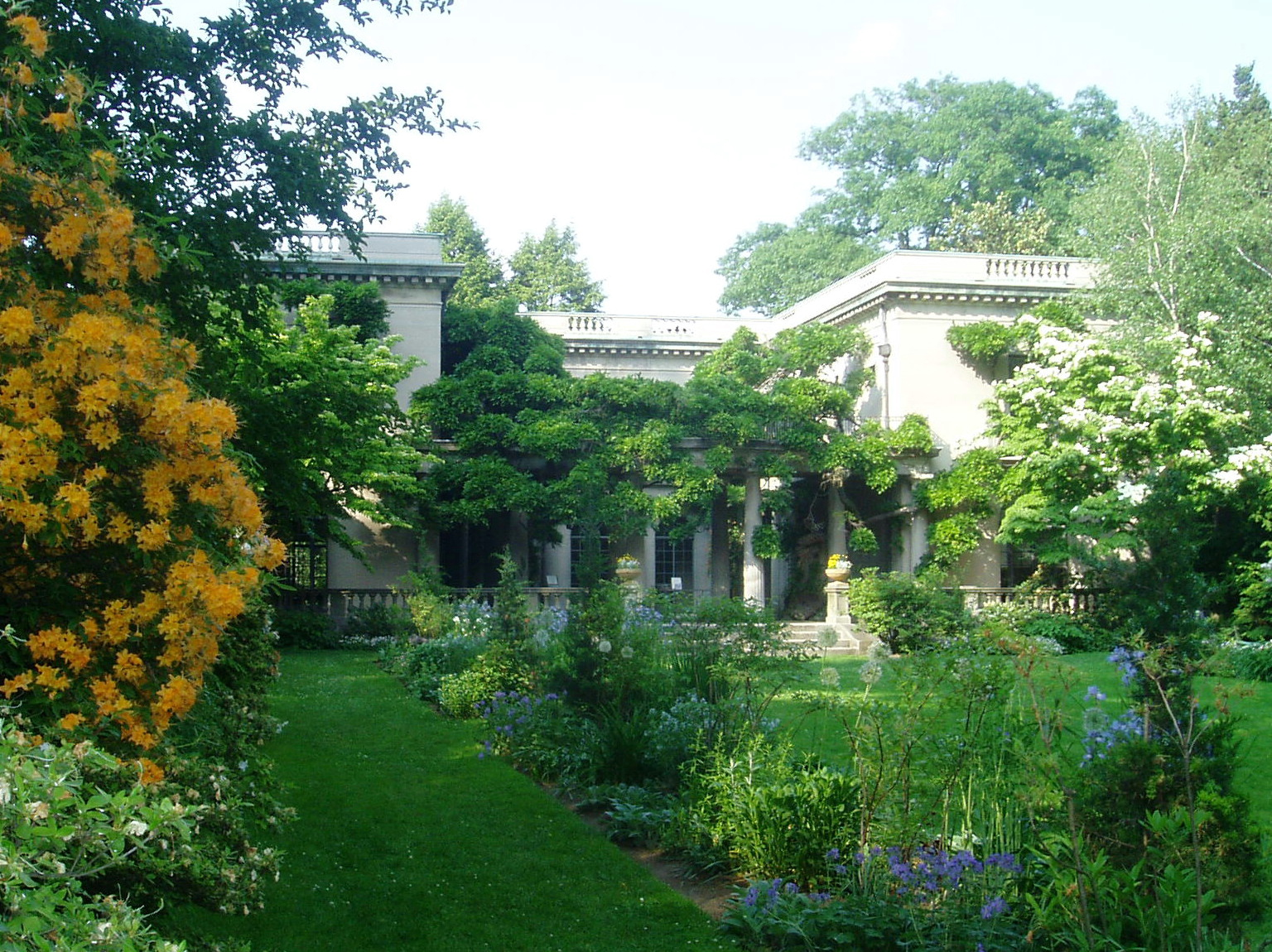
- Back facade

- Location within Essex County, New Jersey
- 40°49′20″N 74°12′43″W
- Location: 21 Van Vleck Street, Montclair, New Jersey, United States

History
- Built: 1916

Site notes
- Area: 5.8 acres (2.3 ha)
- Architect: Joseph Van Vleck Jr
- Architectural style: Mediterranean Revival architecture
- Governing body: National Trust for Historic Preservation

Van Vleck House and Gardens is a former private estate run as a non-profit community resource in Montclair in Essex County, New Jersey, United States. It features a public botanical garden of mostly ericaceous plants that has been developed over several generations. The display of rhododendrons and azaleas shows numerous hybrids, several named after members of the Van Vleck family.

The property had been in the hands of the Van Vleck family until 1993 when it was turned over to The Montclair Foundation. The main house, built in 1916 by Joseph Van Vleck Jr. as a Mediterranean villa, is available for events by non-profit organizations. A Chinese wisteria that was planted in 1939 climbs around the pillars of the back portico.

== Gallery ==
House and Garden Gallery

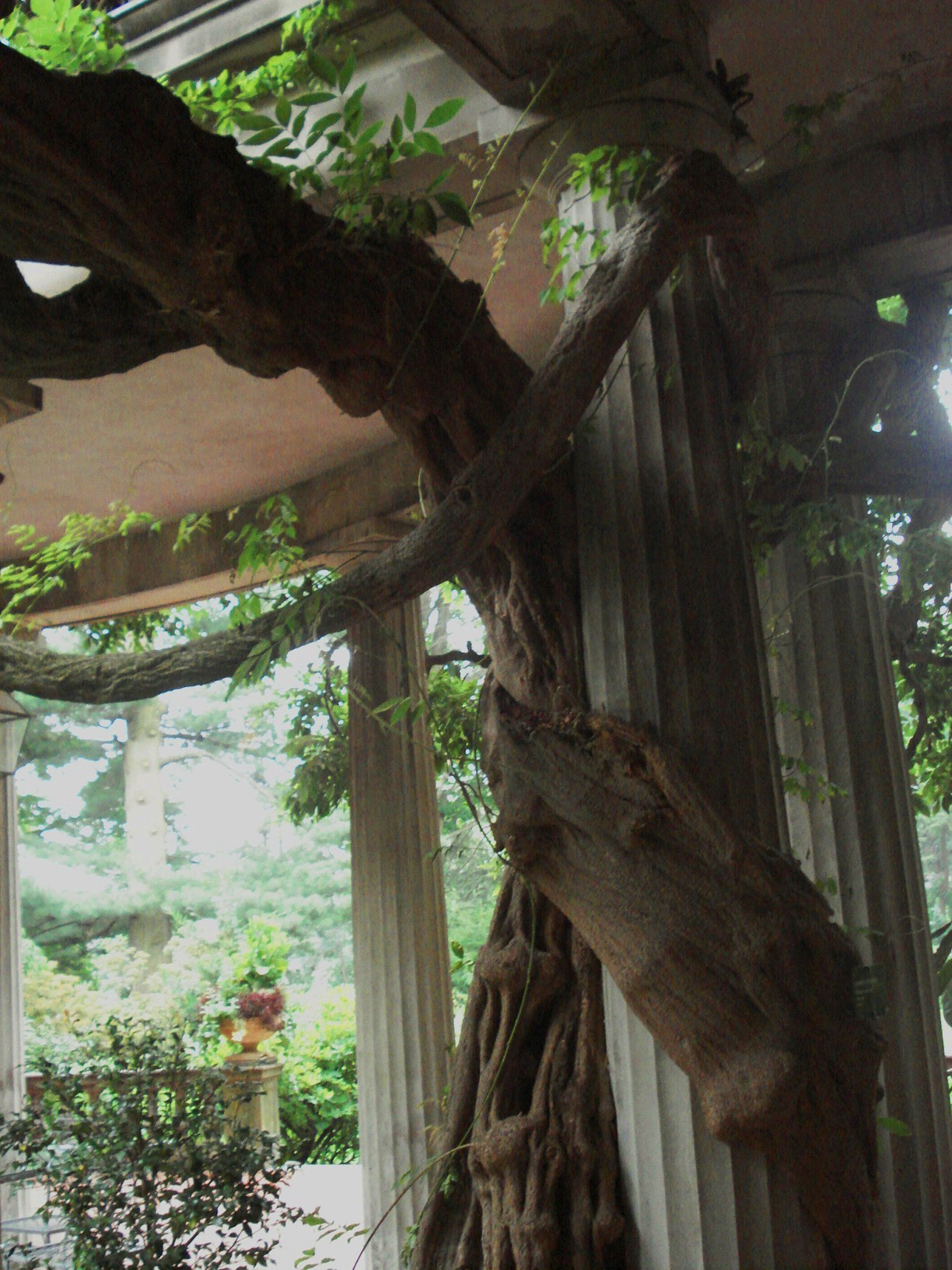
The Wisteria wrapping around one of the pillars

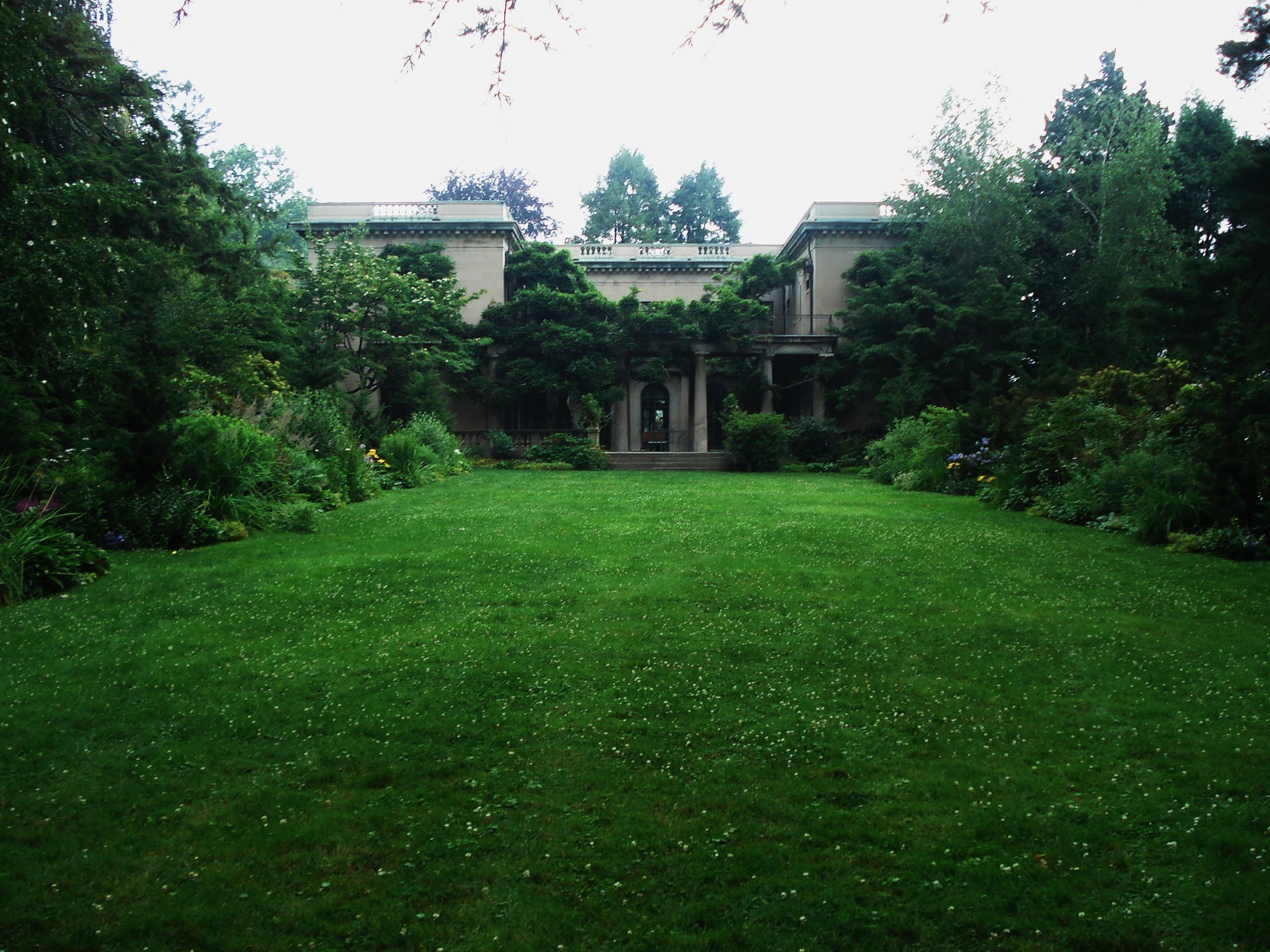
Van Vleck House and Gardens

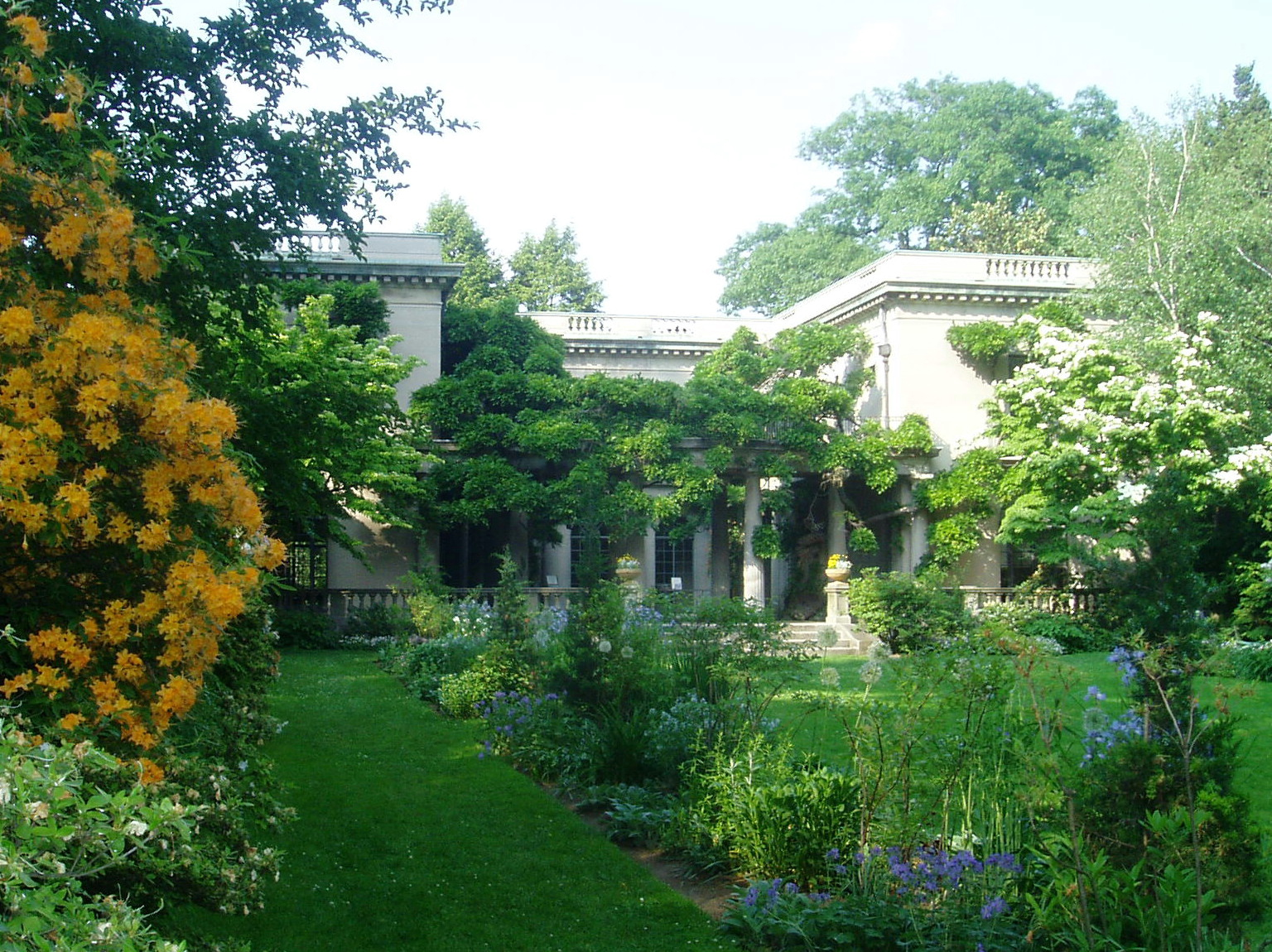
Van Vleck House and Gardens
