= Montclair, New Jersey =

Township in Essex County, New Jersey, US

- Township
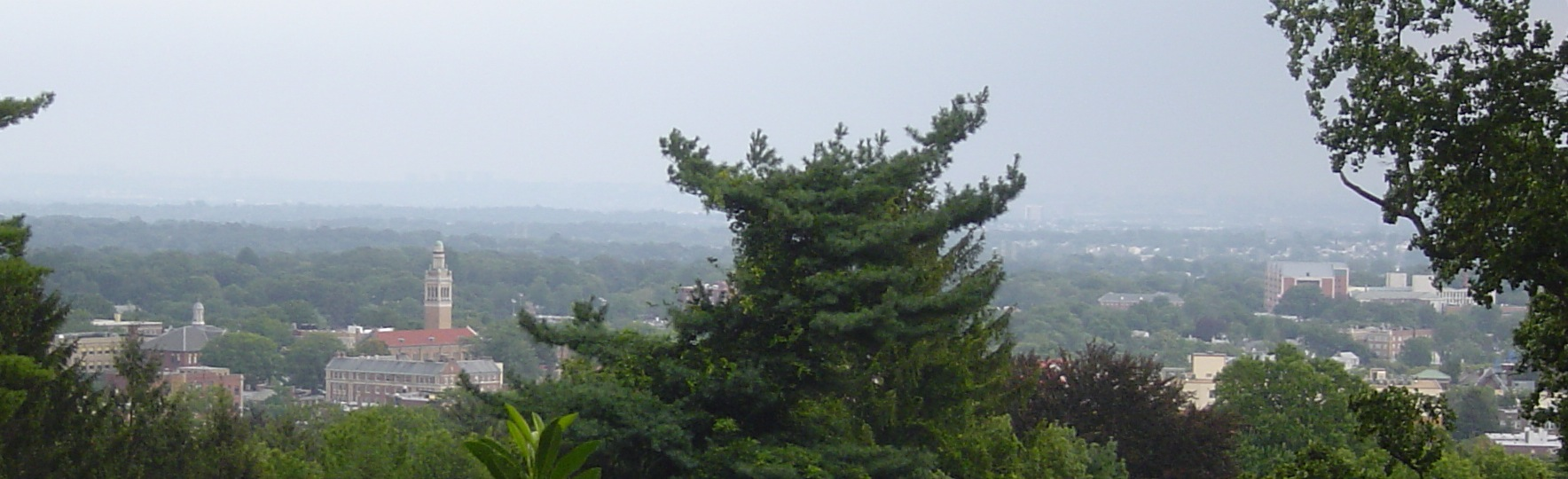
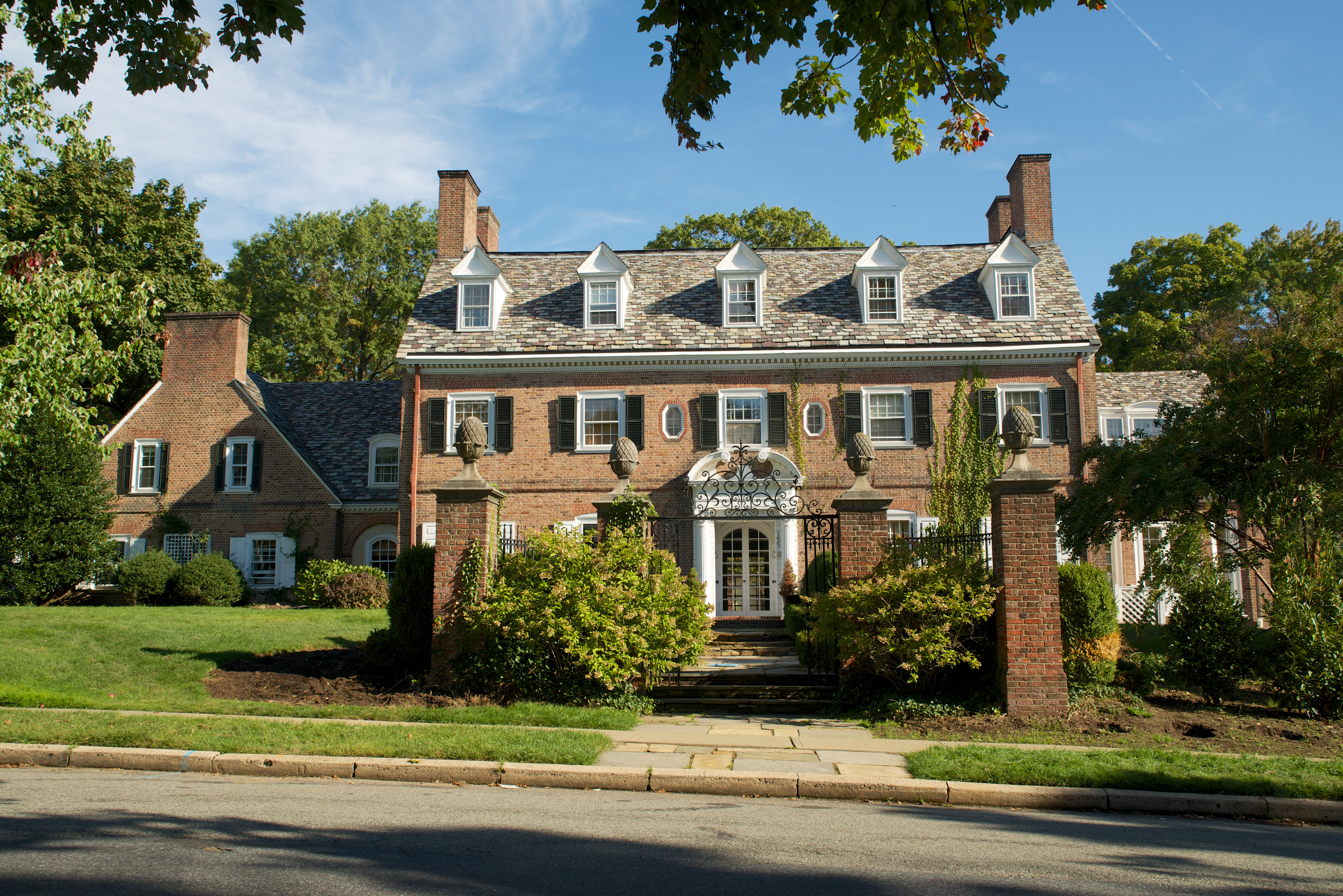
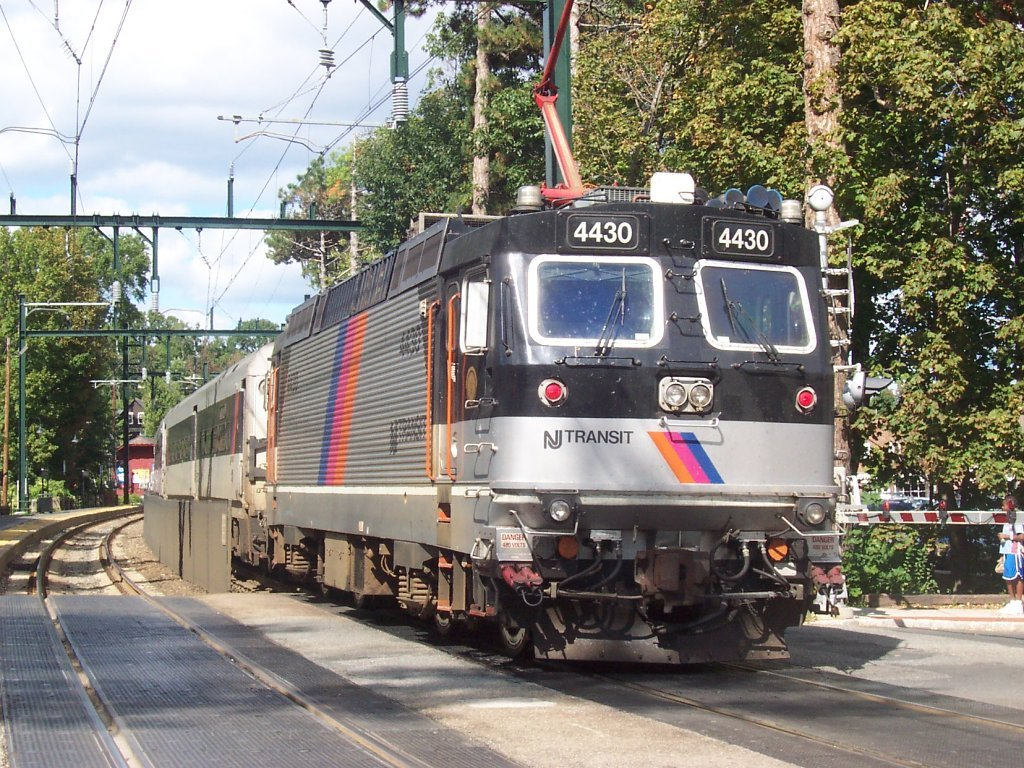
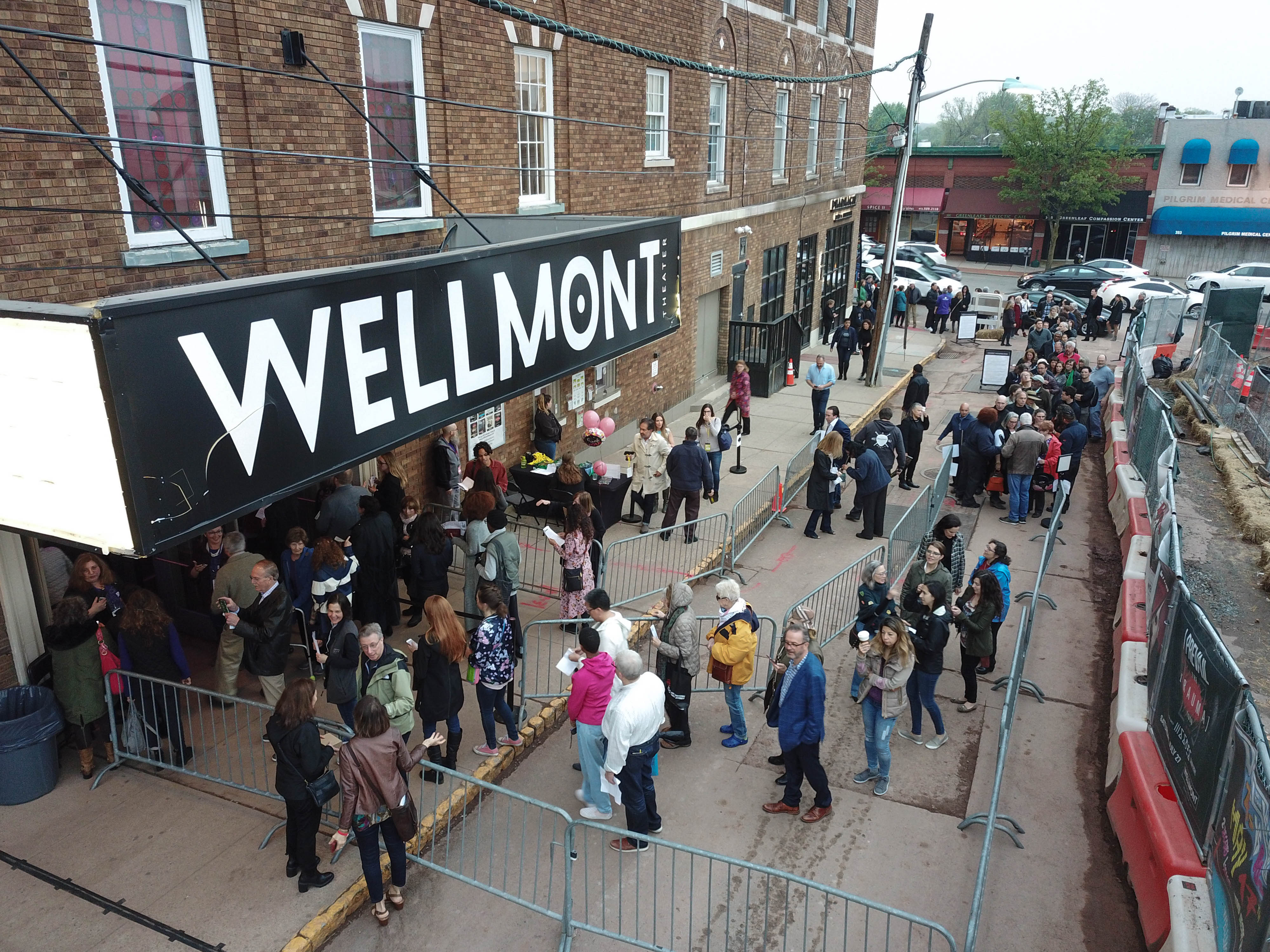
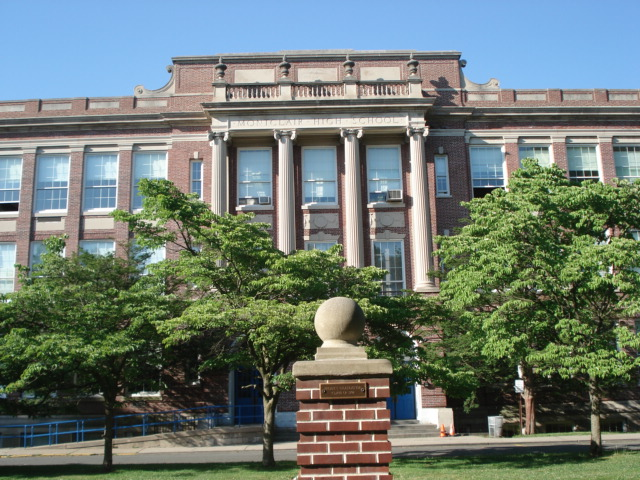
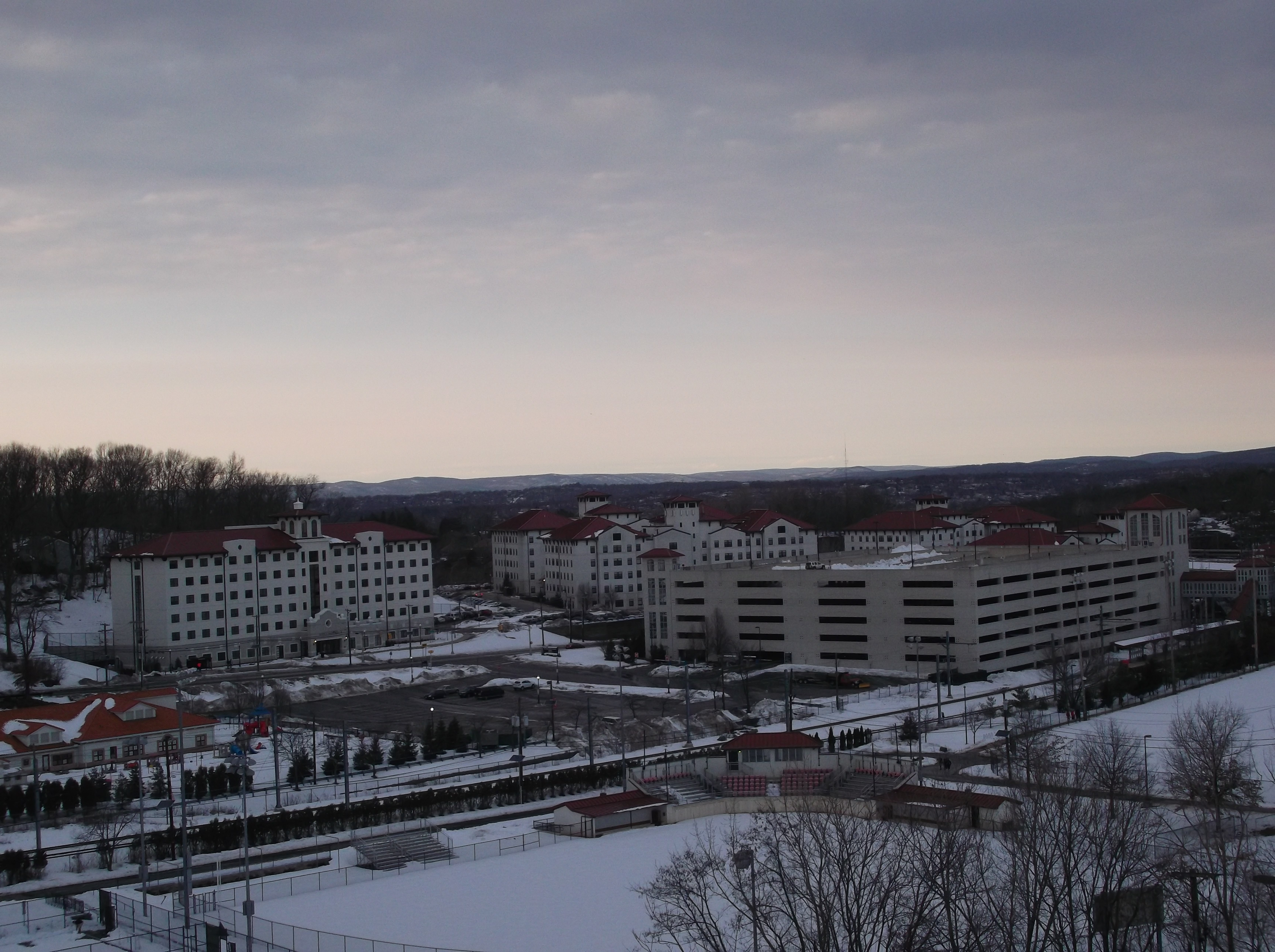
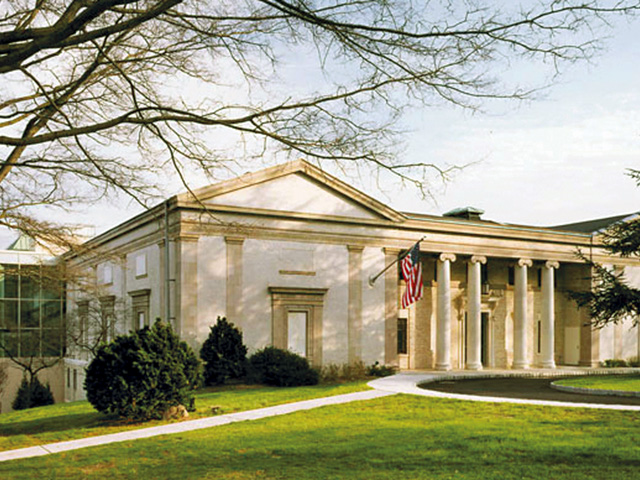
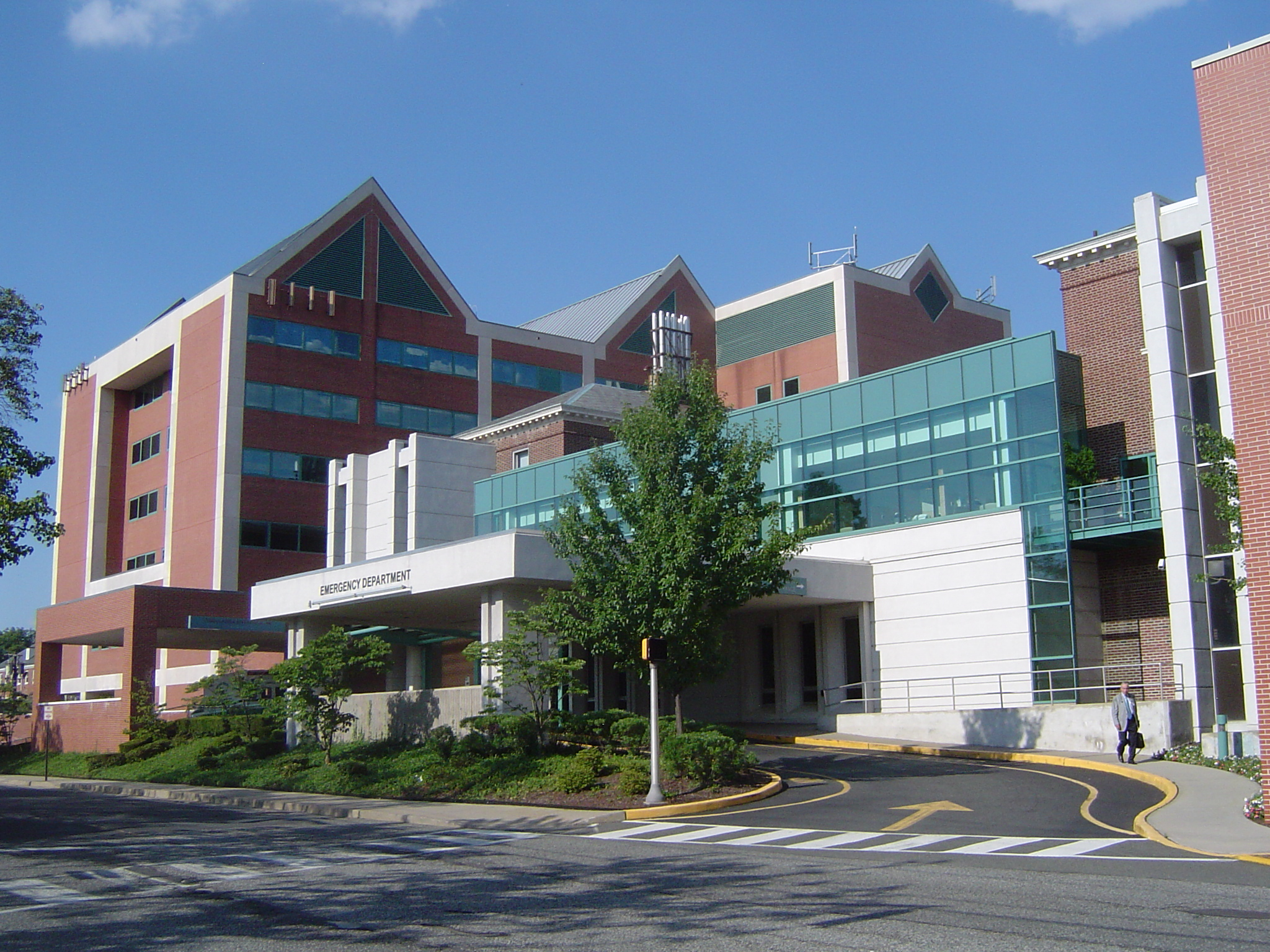
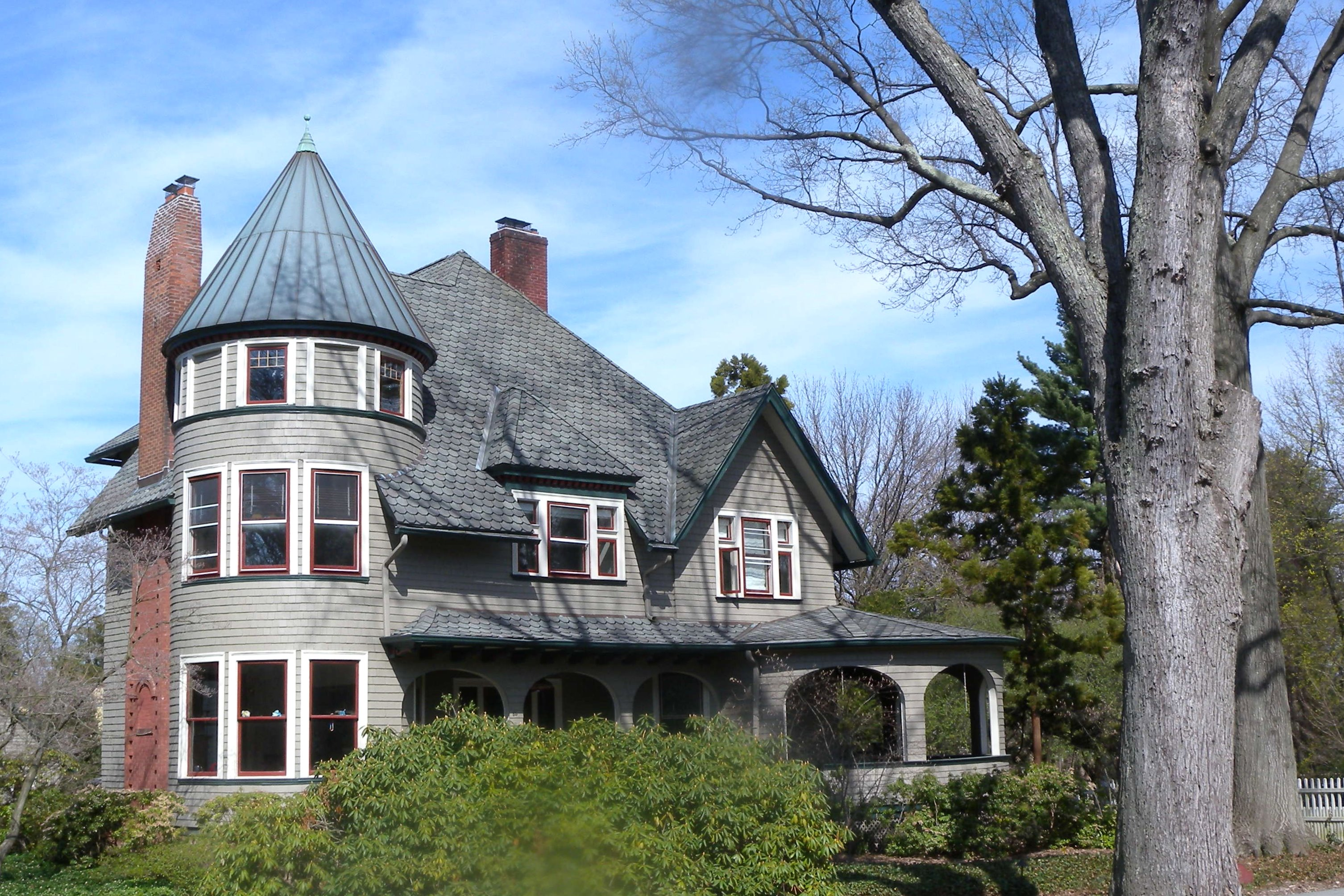
- Panoramic view of Montclair from atop one of the Watchung Mountains, 2008 The Anchorage, 2014 Montclair-Boonton Line bound for the Upper Montclair station, 2006 Opening night for the film Wild Rose at Wellmont Theater, 2019 Montclair High School, 2008 Montclair State University, 2014 Montclair Art Museum, 2008 Mountainside Medical Center, 2008 Victorian home on 30 Eagle Rock Way, 2011
- Interactive map of Montclair, New Jersey
- Location in Essex County Location in New Jersey Location in the United States
- Coordinates: 40.824998°N 74.210856°W
- Country: United States
- State: New Jersey
- County: Essex
- Incorporated: April 15, 1868 (as township)
- Reincorporated: February 24, 1894 (as town)

Government
  - Type: Faulkner Act (council–manager)
  - Body: Township Council
  - Mayor: Renee Baskerville (D) (term ends June 30, 2028)
  - Township manager: Michael Lapolla (interim)
  - Municipal clerk: Angelese Bermúdez Nieves

Area
  - Total: 6.24 sq mi (16.17 km^{2})
  - Land: 6.24 sq mi (16.16 km^{2})
  - Water: 0.0077 sq mi (0.02 km^{2}) 0.11%
  - Rank: 252nd of 565 in state 6th of 22 in county
- Elevation: 299 ft (91 m)

Population (2020)
  - Total: 40,921
  - Estimate (2025): 44,633
  - Rank: 57th of 565 in state 6th of 22 in county
  - Density: 6,560/sq mi (2,530/km^{2})
  - Rank: 79th of 565 in state 10th of 22 in county

Economics
  - Median income: $158,765 (± $11,562) (2018-2022)
- Time zone: UTC−05:00 (Eastern (EST))
  - Summer (DST): UTC−04:00 (Eastern (EDT))
- ZIP Codes: 07042, 07043
- Area code: 973
- FIPS code: 3401347500
- GNIS feature ID: 1729720
- Website: montclairnjusa.org

Montclair is a township in Essex County in the U.S. state of New Jersey. Situated on the cliffs of the Watchung Mountains, Montclair is a commercial and cultural hub of North Jersey and a diverse bedroom community of New York City within the New York metropolitan area. The township is home to Montclair State University, the state's second-largest university.

As of the 2020 United States census, the township's population was 40,921, an increase of 3,252 (+8.6%) from the 2010 census count of 37,669, which in turn reflected a decline of 1,308 (−3.4%) from the 38,977 counted in the 2000 census. As of 2010, it was the 60th-most-populous municipality in New Jersey.

== History ==
Montclair was initially formed as a township on April 15, 1868, from portions of Bloomfield Township, so that a second railroad could be built to Montclair. After a referendum held on February 21, 1894, Montclair was reincorporated as a town three days later. It derives its name from the French mont clair, meaning "clear mountain" or "bright mountain."

In 1980, after multiple protests filed by Montclair officials regarding inequities built into the federal revenue-sharing system for local governments, Montclair voters passed a referendum changing its form of government to being a township, becoming the third of more than a dozen Essex County municipalities to reclassify their governmental organization in order to take advantage of federal revenue sharing policies that allocated townships a greater share of government aid to municipalities on a per capita basis.

Before cannabis was legalized for sale for both medical and recreational use in 2022, the state's first marijuana dispensary opened in Montclair in December 2012, joining Bellmawr, Cranbury, Egg Harbor Township, and Woodbridge Township as one of the five municipalities that had authorized the sale of medical cannabis.

== Geography ==
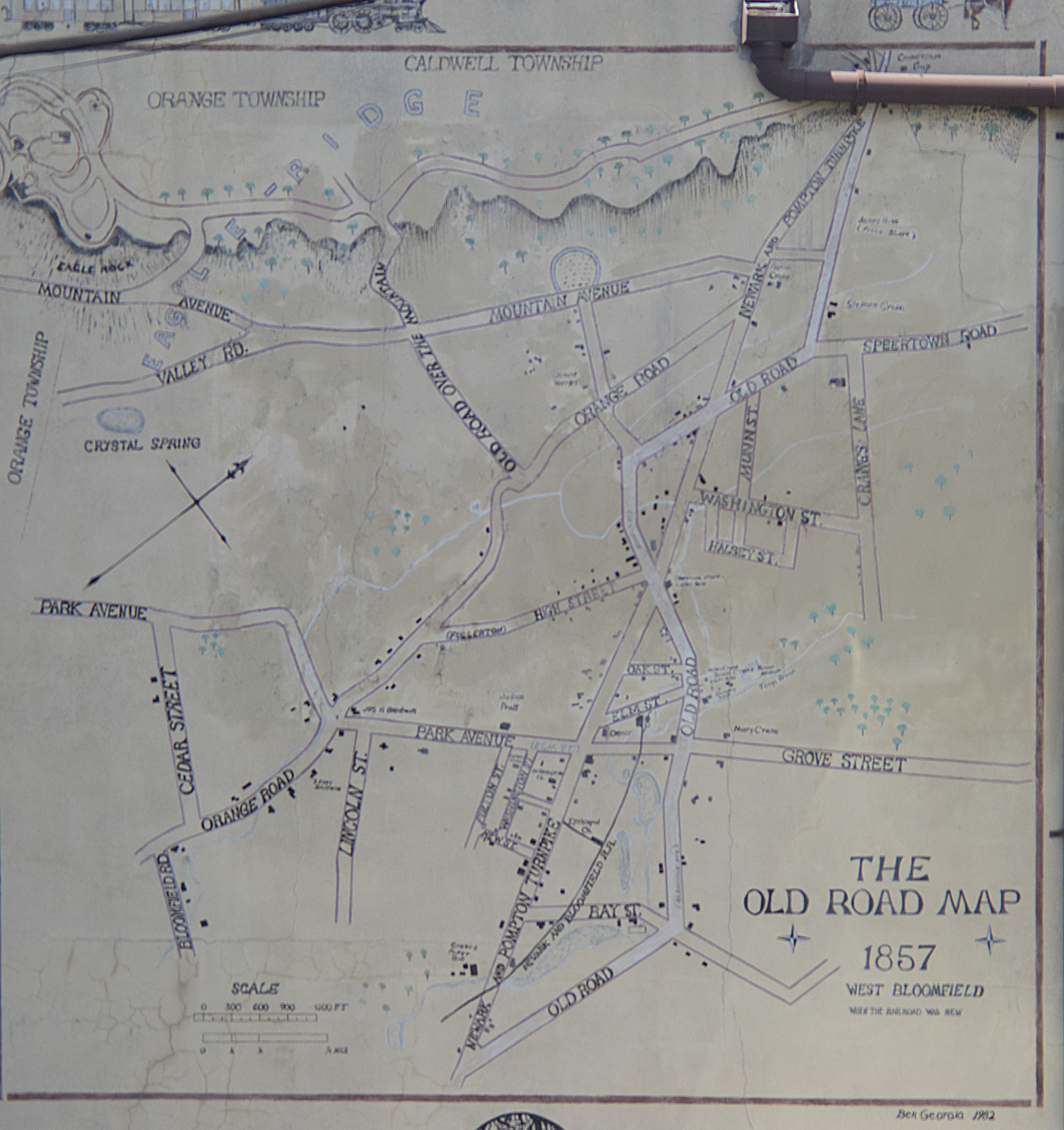
A mural of the road map of Montclair from 1857, when it was known as West Bloomfield

According to the U.S. Census Bureau, the township had a total area of 6.25 square miles (16.17 km^{2}), including 6.24 square miles (16.16 km^{2}) of land and 0.01 square miles (0.02 km^{2}) of water (0.11%).

Montclair is on the east side of the First Mountain of the Watchung Mountains. Some higher locations in the township provide excellent views of the surrounding area and of the New York City skyline about 12 miles (19 km) away.

Named localities in the township include Church Street, Frog Hollow, South End, Upper Montclair, and Watchung Plaza.

Montclair is split between two ZIP Codes. The central and southern parts of the township are designated 07042. Upper Montclair lies north of Watchung Avenue and has a separate ZIP code, 07043. Because the ZIP codes do not exactly match municipal boundaries, a few homes near the borders with neighboring towns fall into the ZIP codes for those communities. A few homes in some adjoining municipalities use one of the two ZIP codes assigned to Montclair, as does HackensackUMC Mountainside (07042, formerly known as Mountainside Hospital), whose campus straddles the border with Glen Ridge. Small areas in the southeast of the township fall into the Glen Ridge ZIP code 07028.

Several streams flow eastward through Montclair: Toney's Brook in the center, Nishuane Brook in the southeast, Wigwam Brook in the southwest, Pearl Brook in the northwest, and Yantacaw Brook in the northeast—all in the Passaic River watershed. Yantacaw and Toney's brooks are dammed in parks to create ponds. Wigwam, Nishuane, and Toney's brooks flow into the Second River, and the others flow into the Third River. Montclair lies just north of the northernmost extent of the Rahway River watershed.

Montclair borders the municipalities of Bloomfield, Cedar Grove, Glen Ridge, Orange, Verona, and West Orange in Essex County; and Clifton and Little Falls in Passaic County.

The southern border of Montclair is a straight line between Eagle Rock, on the ridge of the First Watchung Mountain, and the point where Orange Road begins at the foot of Ridgewood Avenue. The eastern border is roughly a straight line between that point and a point just southwest of where Broad Street crosses the Third River. The western border runs roughly along the ridge of the First Watchung Mountain between Eagle Rock and the Essex County/Passaic County border. The northern border is the border between those two counties.

=== Climate ===
Montclair has a temperate climate, with warm-to-hot, humid summers and cool-to-cold winters, as is characteristic of the Köppen climate classification humid continental climate. January tends to be the coldest month, with average high temperatures in the upper 30s Fahrenheit (2 to 4 C) and lows averaging −6 °C (21 °F). July, the warmest month, features high temperatures in the mid-80s °F (29 to 30 °C) and lows in the 70s °F (21 to 25 °C), with an average high of 30 °C (86 °F). From April to June and from September to early November, Montclair experiences temperatures from the lower 60s to the lower 70s °F (16 to 22 °C).

Montclair gets approximately 50 inches (1,300 mm) of rain per year, above the United States average of 39 inches (990 mm). Snowfall is common from December to early March and totals about 30 inches (76 cm) annually. The number of days each year in Montclair with any measurable precipitation is 90; the area has an average of 202 sunny days.

Montclair is one or two degrees warmer than the neighboring municipalities of Verona and Cedar Grove because of the mountain between them, which sometimes blocks winds and clouds, including warmer air from the ocean to the east.

== Demographics ==
Historical population
Census	Pop.	Note	%±
1870	2,853		—
1880	5,147		80.4%
1890	8,636		67.8%
1900	13,962		61.7%
1910	21,550		54.3%
1920	28,810		33.7%
1930	42,017		45.8%
1940	39,807		−5.3%
1950	43,927		10.3%
1960	43,129		−1.8%
1970	44,043		2.1%
1980	38,321		−13.0%
1990	37,729		−1.5%
2000	38,977		3.3%
2010	37,669		−3.4%
2020	40,921		8.6%
2025 (est.)	44,633		9.1%
Population sources: 1870–1920 1870–1910; 1870 1880–1890; 1890–1910 1900–1930; 1940–2000 2000; 2010 2020

The township has long been known for its ethnic diversity, a feature that has attracted many to the community. Its African-American community was once stable at around 30% of the population for decades, but has declined in both absolute and proportional terms in the 21st century, to 27% in 2010 and then to 22% in 2020. At the same time, the township's Hispanic population has increased, accounting for more than 10% of residents in 2020.

Montclair has attracted many former New Yorkers. Many residents are commuters to the city and its metro area. Some work for major media organizations there.

=== 2020 census ===
Montclair township, Essex County, New Jersey – Racial and Ethnic Composition (NH = Non-Hispanic) Note: the US Census treats Hispanic/Latino as an ethnic category. This table excludes Latinos from the racial categories and assigns them to a separate category. Hispanics/Latinos may be of any race.
Race / Ethnicity	Pop 1990	Pop 2000	Pop 2010	Pop 2020	% 1990	% 2000	% 2010	% 2020
White alone (NH)	24,013	22,268	21,920	22,593	63.65%	57.13%	58.12%	55.25%
Black or African American alone (NH)	11,464	12,194	9,902	9,008	30.39%	31.29%	26.25%	22.02%
Native American or Alaska Native alone (NH)	79	57	39	36	0.21%	0.15%	0.10%	0.09%
Asian alone (NH)	840	1,214	1,416	2,045	2.23%	3.11%	3.76%	5.00%
Pacific Islander alone (NH)	N/A	12	8	11	N/A	0.03%	0.02%	0.03%
Some Other Race alone (NH)	84	220	237	444	0.22%	0.56%	0.63%	1.08%
Mixed Race/Multi-Racial (NH)	N/A	1,017	1,337	2,480	N/A	2.61%	3.55%	6.07%
Hispanic or Latino (any race)	1,249	1,995	2,810	4,304	3.31%	5.12%	7.47%	10.53%
Total	37,729	38,977	37,669	40,921	100.00%	100.00%	100.00%	100.00%

=== 2010 census ===
The 2010 United States census counted 37,669 people, 15,089 households, and 9,446 families in the township. The population density was 5,971.2 per square mile (2,305.5/km^{2}). There were 15,911 housing units at an average density of 2,522.2 per square mile (973.8/km^{2}). The racial makeup was 62.16% (23,416) White, 27.16% (10,230) Black or African American, 0.16% (59) Native American, 3.81% (1,434) Asian, 0.02% (9) Pacific Islander, 2.19% (826) from other races, and 4.50% (1,695) from two or more races. Hispanic or Latino residents of any race were 7.46% (2,810) of the population.

Of the 15,089 households, 33.9% had children under the age of 18; 46.1% were married couples living together; 13.2% had a female householder with no husband present and 37.4% were non-families. Of all households, 30.9% were made up of individuals and 8.9% had someone living alone who was 65 years of age or older. The average household size was 2.47 and the average family size was 3.15.

25.5% of the population were under the age of 18, 6.2% from 18 to 24, 26.7% from 25 to 44, 30.3% from 45 to 64, and 11.3% who were 65 years of age or older. The median age was 39.9 years. For every 100 females, the population had 87.2 males. For every 100 females ages 18 and older there were 82.2 males.

The Census Bureau's 2006–2010 American Community Survey showed that (in 2010 inflation-adjusted dollars) median household income was $95,696 (with a margin of error of +/− $5,396) and the median family income was $126,983 (+/− $8,950). Males had a median income of $83,589 (+/− $5,955) versus $66,063 (+/− $3,616) for females. The per capita income for the township was $53,572 (+/− $2,671). About 4.6% of families and 2.7% of the population were below the poverty line, including 7.0% of those under age 18 and 4.6% of those age 65 or over.

== Economy ==
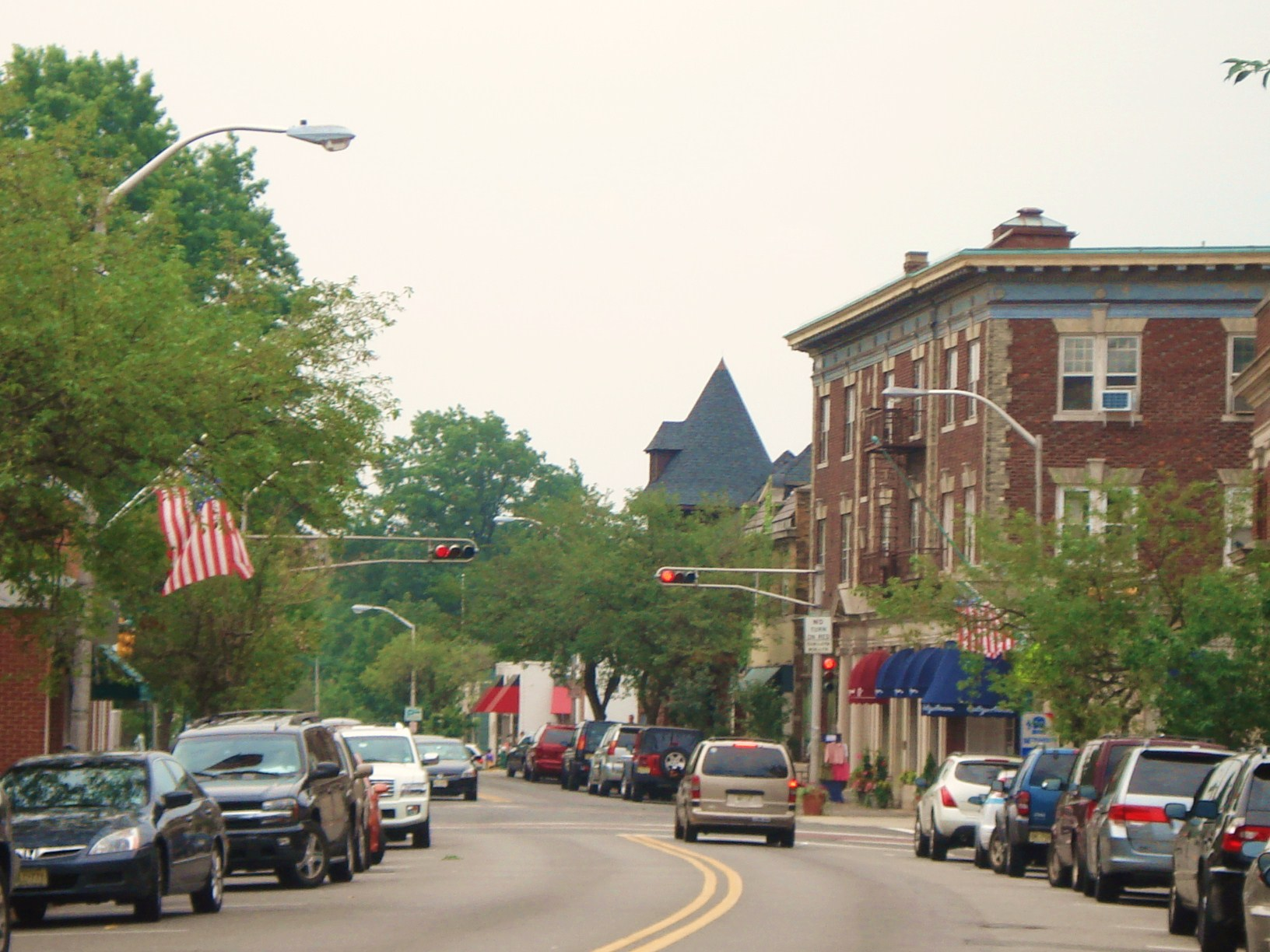
The Upper Montclair neighborhood

Montclair has six distinct commercial zones:

- Montclair Center, also known as Downtown Montclair, centered on the intersection of Bloomfield Avenue, South Fullerton Avenue, Glenridge Avenue, and Church Street, is the township's main commercial zone. This intersection is also known as Six Corners. It is home to some of Montclair's largest stores and restaurants and features many upscale restaurants and boutiques near the center of this commercial district. Near the eastern end of this district is Lackawanna Plaza, which once housed the Lackawanna railway station. There is a post office one block to the north of this area. In 2015, Montclair Center won the Great American Main Street Award from the National Trust for Historic Preservation.
- Upper Montclair, in the north of the town, is the second-largest commercial zone. The center is the intersection of Valley Road and Bellevue Avenue and incorporates the surrounding areas. The Upper Montclair Business District is home to several restaurants, shops, and in more recent times, chain stores. Upper Montclair is home to the Upper Montclair railway station, a post office, and Anderson Park, a 14.85-acre parcel of land donated by Montclair resident Charles W. Anderson in 1903. It was called Montclair Park until 1909 when the township requested the name change. The park was designed by John Charles Olmsted, the stepson of Frederick Law Olmsted.
- Watchung Plaza is located around the intersection of Watchung Avenue and Park Street and is on the divide between two Montclair ZIP Codes, 07042 and 07043. It is home to many "Mom and Pop Stores" and other small businesses. Watchung Plaza has its own post office. It is served by the Watchung Avenue station.
- Walnut Street, built around the Walnut Street train station. In the spring, summer, and fall it is home to the Montclair Farmer's Market. This commercial zone is home to many restaurants and cafes as well as home to Montclair Brewery, New Jersey's first black-owned microbrewery, and Montclair's only operating brewery.
- South End, in the south of town, at the intersection of Cedar Avenue and Orange Road.
- Valley Road, between Chestnut Street and Claremont Avenue, is known locally as "Frog Hollow." This area has some strip mall-style shops on one side, and on the other side, window shops with residential apartments on top of them.

== Arts and culture ==
=== Literature and film ===
In the 1948 biographical novel Cheaper by the Dozen, the principal characters Frank Bunker Gilbreth Sr. and Lillian Moller Gilbreth live in Montclair, as the authors did in real life.

Some scenes of the film "Seven Minutes in Heaven" (1986) were filmed in and around Montclair High School.

The 1989 film Bloodhounds of Broadway, which starred Madonna, Matt Dillon, and Jennifer Grey, was partially filmed in Montclair.

Pedro Almodóvar's 2024 film The Room Next Door features scenes filmed in the Montclair Book Center and Montclair State University.

The HBO drama The Sopranos features several scenes shot in and taking place in Montclair with numerous references to the township appearing in the show.

=== Music ===
Herman Hupfeld, composer of the song "As Time Goes By", was born, lived, and was buried in Montclair. The song was voted No. 2 on the AFI's 100 Years...100 Songs special, commemorating the best songs in film.

The indie rock band Pinegrove is from Montclair. In 2023, it released Montclair: Live at the Wellmont Theater, a film recording a 2021 performance in Montclair.

=== Theatre ===
In 1971, the actors Louis Zorich and his wife, the later Oscar-winning actress, Olympia Dukakis, founded a theatre group that included Remi Barclay, Jason Bosseau, Margery Fierst, Gerald Fierst, and many others. Some of the acting artistic and administrative participants were permanent, and semi-permanent. Performances were peppered with visits and occasional celebrity artists. Naming themselves Whole Theatre, they based themselves in Montclair. Located 12 miles (19 km) from Midtown Manhattan via the Lincoln Tunnel under the Hudson River, the Whole Theatre productions were readily available to New York City and New Jersey audiences.

In the two decades in which Whole Theatre flourished, it presented a long list of performances in a wide variety of genres. Productions included The Rose Tattoo, Mother Courage, Rabelais: a Dramatic Game (1985), and America at Full Moon (1986).

The theatre enjoyed the support of the local community and the theatre community of New York and New Jersey generally. For example, in 1975–1976 the company acknowledged over 120 substantial donors in their program as well as funding from the New Jersey State Council on the Arts and the Rockefeller Brothers Fund.

In 1989, Olympia Dukakis was named as the company's Artistic Director. Her two co-directors were Remi Barclay and Gerald Fierst, who were jointly responsible for Education and Outreach. In 2018 Brooke Lea Foster of The New York Times stated that it was one of several "least suburban of suburbs, each one celebrated by buyers there for its culture and hip factor, as much as the housing stock and sophisticated post-city life."

=== Art institutions ===
Montclair hosts many art institutions and theaters, and despite its relatively small size, has many art venues. It has its own art museum, the Montclair Art Museum, and several small galleries.

Montclair also hosts one cinema, the Claridge Cinema on Bloomfield Avenue that shows different types of movies from documentaries to small-scale indie films. The township hosted its first annual film festival in 2012 to provide a platform for filmmakers from New Jersey, the US, and the world.

Live theaters include The Montclair Operetta Company, the Wellmont Theater, Montclair State University's Kasser Theater, Montclair State University's theater in Life Hall, and the Studio Playhouse. On Bloomfield Avenue, there is a public stage used for concerts and other events. Dotted around Montclair there are also many art galleries, although most are centered in the Bloomfield Avenue Downtown Area. Concerts are held at the Wellmont Theater and at several churches and auditoriums sponsored by Outpost in the Burbs, a community-based organization. In 2017, The Montclair Orchestra was formed as a semi-professional orchestra, with professional musicians and students from top colleges.

Montclair was the setting for some of the stories in the HBO television series The Sopranos, and many Montclair streets, locations, and businesses were featured in the show, such as Bloomfield Avenue.

Montclair Public Library is one of the oldest public libraries in New Jersey, with the largest collection of materials in northern New Jersey. Following the COVID-19 pandemic, the Montclair city council cut library funding to the minimum levels required by New Jersey law. The library's director resigned following a forensic audit, in which no irregularities were found.

== Sports ==
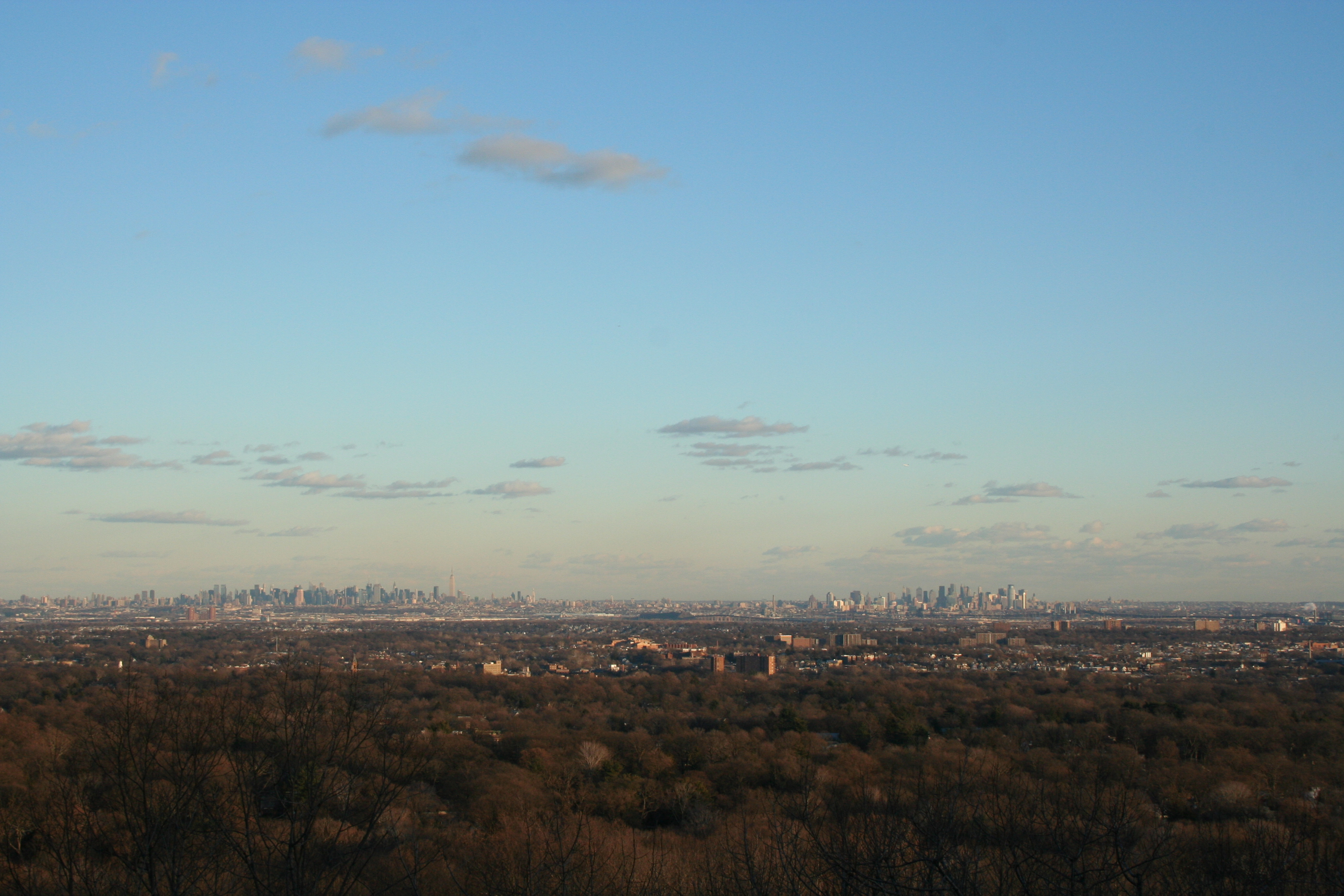
Skyline of New York City from Montclair at the start of the range of the Watchung Mountains

- Independent baseball league New Jersey Jackals of the Frontier League. From 1998 until 2022, the Jackals played at Yogi Berra Stadium, which has seating for 3,784, plus overflow capacity. The Jackals moved to Hinchliffe Stadium in Paterson, New Jersey.
- New York Red Bulls II, the USL Championship affiliate of Major League Soccer's New York Red Bulls, play at Montclair State University as of 2017.
- The New Jersey Pride of Major League Lacrosse played in Montclair for the 2004 and 2005 seasons.
- Montclair Rugby Football Club, also known as the Norsemen, of USA Rugby Division 2, play at Codey Field.
- Essex Eagles cricket team, a division III team in the Cricket League of New Jersey.
- Montclair United Soccer Club
- Amateur Baseball Association baseball team the Montclair Giants
- Montclair Athletic Club ice hockey team, member of the American Amateur Hockey League in 1897–1898 and 1898–1899.

== Parks and recreation ==
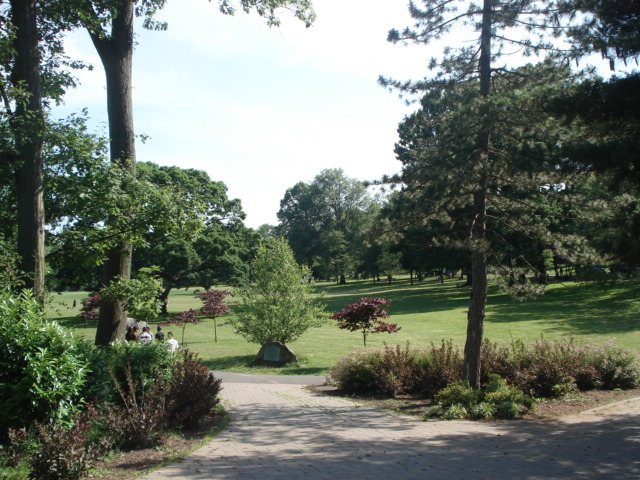
Anderson Park

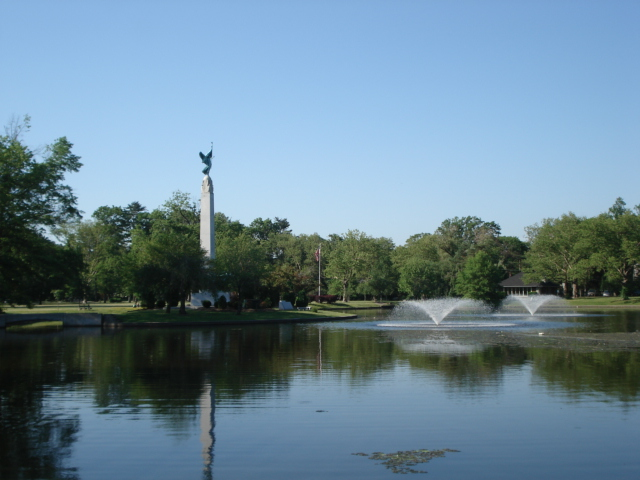
Edgemont Memorial Park

Montclair is home to many parks and nature reserves. Parks in Montclair are both county and municipal. Additional open space includes the Presby Memorial Iris Gardens, and many school-owned sports fields, viz., Montclair State University's Sprague Field. In total Montclair has 153.9 acres (0.623 km^{2}) of township park land spread over 18 parks and 123.8 acres (0.501 km^{2}) of county park land consisting of five parks.

Municipal parks include Mountainside Park, the township's largest at 33.2 acres (13.4 ha), which offers extensive tennis and recreation facilities, and includes the Presby Memorial Iris Gardens, a 6.5-acre (2.6 ha) living museum donated by the family of Frank Presby that is maintained by volunteers and dedicated to the iris. Covering nearly 20 acres (8.1 ha) of wetlands and uplands along the Third River, the Alonzo F. Bonsal Wildlife Preserve offers hiking trails and other passive recreation. Yantacaw Brook Park, covering 11.5 acres (4.7 ha), surrounds a pond that is fed by Yantacaw Brook and that in turn feeds into the Third River on its way towards the Passaic River.

The township has 17 public tennis courts, four skating rinks (two of which are indoor), and three public swimming pools: the Mountainside pool, the Nishuane pool, and the Essex pool.

In 2007, township residents advocated for the construction of a public skatepark. Community members revitalized the effort in 2010 and lobbied the Parks and Recreation Committee for support. The township council passed a resolution expressing approval of the project but allocated no funds for it. In the spring of 2020, an impromptu skatepark was created by community members on two of the unused tennis courts at Rand Park on North Fullerton Avenue during the COVID-19 pandemic. In July 2020, the township held a ribbon-cutting ceremony to officially recognize this space as a temporary skatepark. The township's playground insurance covers skateboarding, allowing it to allocate funds to the park. The township paid for signs for the skatepark using its playground fund. All skating equipment (ramps, rails, etc.) at Rand Park has been provided by community members with no financial support from the township.

== Media ==
Montclair has one local newspaper, the Montclair Local.

In addition, there is a radio station at 90.3 FM on the campus of Montclair State University, WMSC.

There is a pirate radio station broadcasting at 91.9 FM on Valley Road, between Bellevue Rd. and Lorraine Ave. playing "I'll make love to you" by Boyz II Men. The transponder, owned by George Louvis, has been broadcasting the song on repeat since 2007.

The township has a municipal public service television channel, Channel 34, where township council and school board meetings are broadcast. Montclair High School has its own paper the Mountaineer, and Montclair State University has its own student-run paper, the Montclarion. WNJN, one of four stations of state-wide PBS member station NJTV, is also located there.

== Government ==
=== Local government ===
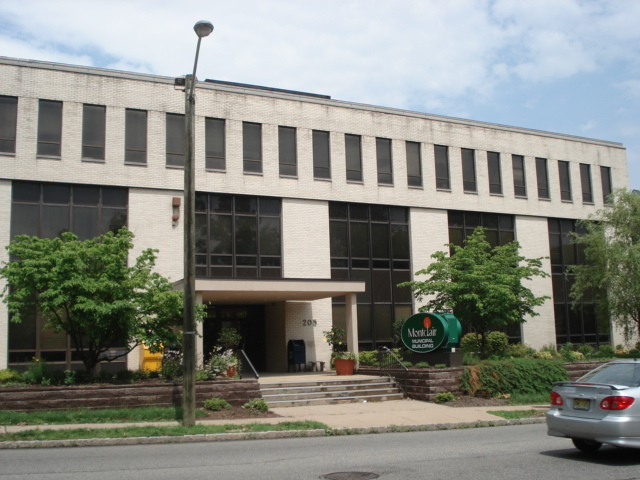
Montclair Municipal Building, the town's government building

Since July 1, 1988, Montclair has been governed under the Council-Manager Plan 13 form of municipal government under the Faulkner Act, whose originator, Bayard H. Faulkner, was a former mayor of Montclair. The township is one of 42 municipalities (of the 564) statewide that use this form of government. The governing body is comprised of the mayor and the township council, who are elected to concurrent four-year terms on a non-partisan basis in elections held as part of the May municipal elections. The mayor is elected directly by the voters. The township council includes six members, of which two council seats are elected from the township at-large and one council seat is elected from each of four wards. A deputy mayor is selected by the six council members from their members, and this position is largely ceremonial. The mayor has no executive powers, but presides over council meetings and has both a voice and vote in its proceedings. The mayor appoints members to many local governing groups, most notably the board of education.

As of 2025, the mayor of Montclair is Renee Baskerville, who became the township's first African-American woman elected as mayor. Members of the township council are Deputy Mayor Susan Shin Andersen (At-Large), Eileen Birmingham (Second Ward), Erik D'Amato (First Ward), Carmel Loughman (At-Large), Aminah Toler (Fourth Ward), and Rahum Williams (Third Ward), all serving terms of office expiring on June 30, 2028.

=== Federal, state, and county representation ===
Logo of Montclair, depicting the letter 'l' as the memorial obelisk in Edgemont Memorial Park

Montclair is split between the 10th and 11th Congressional Districts and is part of New Jersey's 27th state legislative district.

Prior to the 2010 Census, Montclair had been part of the 8th Congressional District and the 10th Congressional District, a change made by the New Jersey Redistricting Commission that took effect in January 2013, based on the results of the November 2012 general elections. The split that took effect in 2013 drew the southern section of the township (26,730 residents) into the 10th District, while the northern portion (11,299 residents) moved to the 11th District.

For the 119th United States Congress, New Jersey's 10th congressional district is represented by LaMonica McIver (D, Newark). For the 119th United States Congress, New Jersey's 11th congressional district is represented by Analilia Mejia (D, Glen Ridge) who was elected in a 2026 special election to serve for the remainder of the Congress following the resignation Mikie Sherrill (D, Montclair), who was elected Governor of New Jersey in 2025. New Jersey is represented in the United States Senate by Democrats Cory Booker (Newark, term ends 2027) and Andy Kim (Moorestown, term ends 2031).

For the 2026–2027 session, the 27th legislative district of the New Jersey Legislature is represented in the State Senate by John F. McKeon (D, West Orange) and in the General Assembly by Rosy Bagolie (D, Livingston) and Alixon Collazos-Gill (D, Montclair).

Essex County is governed by a directly elected county executive, with legislative functions performed by the Board of County Commissioners. As of 2025, the County Executive is Joseph N. DiVincenzo Jr. (D, Roseland), whose four-year term of office ends December 31, 2026. The county's Board of County Commissioners is composed of nine members, five of whom are elected from districts and four of whom are elected on an at-large basis. They are elected for three-year concurrent terms and may be re-elected to successive terms at the annual election in November. Essex County's Commissioners are:

Robert Mercado (D, District 1 – Newark's North and East Wards, parts of Central and West Wards; Newark, 2026), A'Dorian Murray-Thomas (D, District 2 – Irvington, Maplewood and parts of Newark's South and West Wards; Newark, 2026), Vice President Tyshammie L. Cooper (D, District 3 - Newark: West and Central Wards; East Orange, Orange and South Orange; East Orange, 2026), Leonard M. Luciano (D, District 4 – Caldwell, Cedar Grove, Essex Fells, Fairfield, Livingston, Millburn, North Caldwell, Roseland, Verona, West Caldwell and West Orange; West Caldwell, 2026), President Carlos M. Pomares (D, District 5 – Belleville, Bloomfield, Glen Ridge, Montclair and Nutley; Bloomfield, 2026), Brendan W. Gill (D, at large; Montclair, 2026), Romaine Graham (D, at large; Irvington, 2026), Wayne Richardson (D, at large; Newark, 2026), Patricia Sebold (D, at-large; Livingston, 2026).

Constitutional officers elected countywide are: Clerk Christopher J. Durkin (D, West Caldwell, 2025), Register of Deeds Juan M. Rivera Jr. (D, Newark, 2029), Sheriff Amir Jones (D, Newark, 2027), and Surrogate Alturrick Kenney (D, Newark, 2028).

=== Politics ===
As of March 2011, there were a total of 27,289 registered voters in Montclair, of whom 14,782 (54.2%) were registered as Democrats, 2,581 (9.5%) were registered as Republicans and 9,903 (36.3%) were registered as unaffiliated. There were 23 voters registered as Libertarians or Greens. Montclair has consistently ranked as one of the most steadfastly Democratic suburbs in New Jersey, with no presidential candidate breaking 20% of the vote since George W. Bush. No candidate has broken 30% of the vote in any statewide election in the 2000s, even in the 2013 gubernatorial election.

United States presidential election results for Montclair
Year	Republican		Democratic		Third party(ies)	
Year	No.	%	No.	%	No.	%
2024	2,669	11.98%	19,159	86.03%	443	1.99%
2020	2,430	10.25%	21,015	88.66%	258	1.09%
2016	2,318	11.02%	18,048	85.83%	661	3.14%
2012	3,034	15.93%	15,811	83.01%	201	1.06%
2008	3,294	15.82%	17,396	83.55%	132	0.63%
2004	3,995	20.23%	15,597	78.98%	157	0.79%

In the 2016 presidential election, Democrat Hillary Clinton received 85.8% of the vote (18,048 votes), ahead of Republican Donald Trump with 11.0% (2,318 votes), and other candidates with 3.1% (661 votes), among the 21,382 ballots cast by the township's 31,610 registered voters (355 ballots were spoiled), for a turnout of 67.6%. In the 2012 presidential election, Barack Obama received 83.0% of the vote (15,811 cast), ahead of Republican Mitt Romney with 15.9% (3,034 votes), and other candidates with 1.1% (201 votes), among the 19,576 ballots cast by the township's 29,463 registered voters (530 ballots were spoiled), for a turnout of 66.4%. In the 2008 presidential election, Democrat Barack Obama received 83.0% of the vote (17,396 cast), ahead of Republican John McCain with 15.7% (3,294 votes) and other candidates with 0.6% (132 votes), among the 20,951 ballots cast by the township's 27,476 registered voters, for a turnout of 76.3%. In the 2004 presidential election, Democrat John Kerry received 78.8% of the vote (15,597 ballots cast), outpolling Republican George W. Bush with 20.2% (3,995 votes) and other candidates with 0.6% (157 votes), among the 19,804 ballots cast by the township's 25,762 registered voters, for a turnout percentage of 76.9.

Gubernatorial election results for Montclair
Year	Republican		Democratic		Third party(ies)	
Year	No.	%	No.	%	No.	%
2025	2,111	10.94%	17,126	88.75%	60	0.31%
2021	1,858	12.54%	12,810	86.49%	143	0.97%
2017	1,262	10.27%	10,765	87.63%	258	2.10%
2013	3,057	28.30%	7,613	70.48%	131	1.21%
2009	2,573	18.90%	10,139	74.46%	905	6.65%
2005	2,623	20.28%	10,030	77.54%	282	2.18%

In the 2013 gubernatorial election, Democrat Barbara Buono received 70.5% of the vote (7,613 cast), ahead of Republican Chris Christie with 28.3% (3,057 votes), and other candidates with 1.2% (131 votes), among the 10,941 ballots cast by the township's 29,768 registered voters (140 ballots were spoiled), for a turnout of 36.8%. In the 2009 gubernatorial election, Democrat Jon Corzine received 73.9% of the vote (10,139 ballots cast), ahead of Republican Chris Christie with 18.7% (2,573 votes), Independent Chris Daggett with 5.8% (801 votes) and other candidates with 0.8% (104 votes), among the 13,723 ballots cast by the township's 26,843 registered voters, yielding a 51.1% turnout.

United States Senate election results for Montclair1
Year	Republican		Democratic		Third party(ies)	
Year	No.	%	No.	%	No.	%
2024	2,640	12.05%	18,770	85.66%	501	2.29%
2018	2,118	12.93%	13,834	84.43%	434	2.65%
2012	2,875	16.03%	14,671	81.79%	391	2.18%
2006	2,552	19.14%	10,619	79.66%	159	1.19%

United States Senate election results for Montclair2
Year	Republican		Democratic		Third party(ies)	
Year	No.	%	No.	%	No.	%
2020	2,652	11.32%	20,386	87.05%	382	1.63%
2014	1,570	14.24%	9,317	84.53%	135	1.22%
2013	1,301	13.56%	8,234	85.83%	58	0.60%
2008	3,385	18.38%	14,691	79.76%	343	1.86%

== Education ==
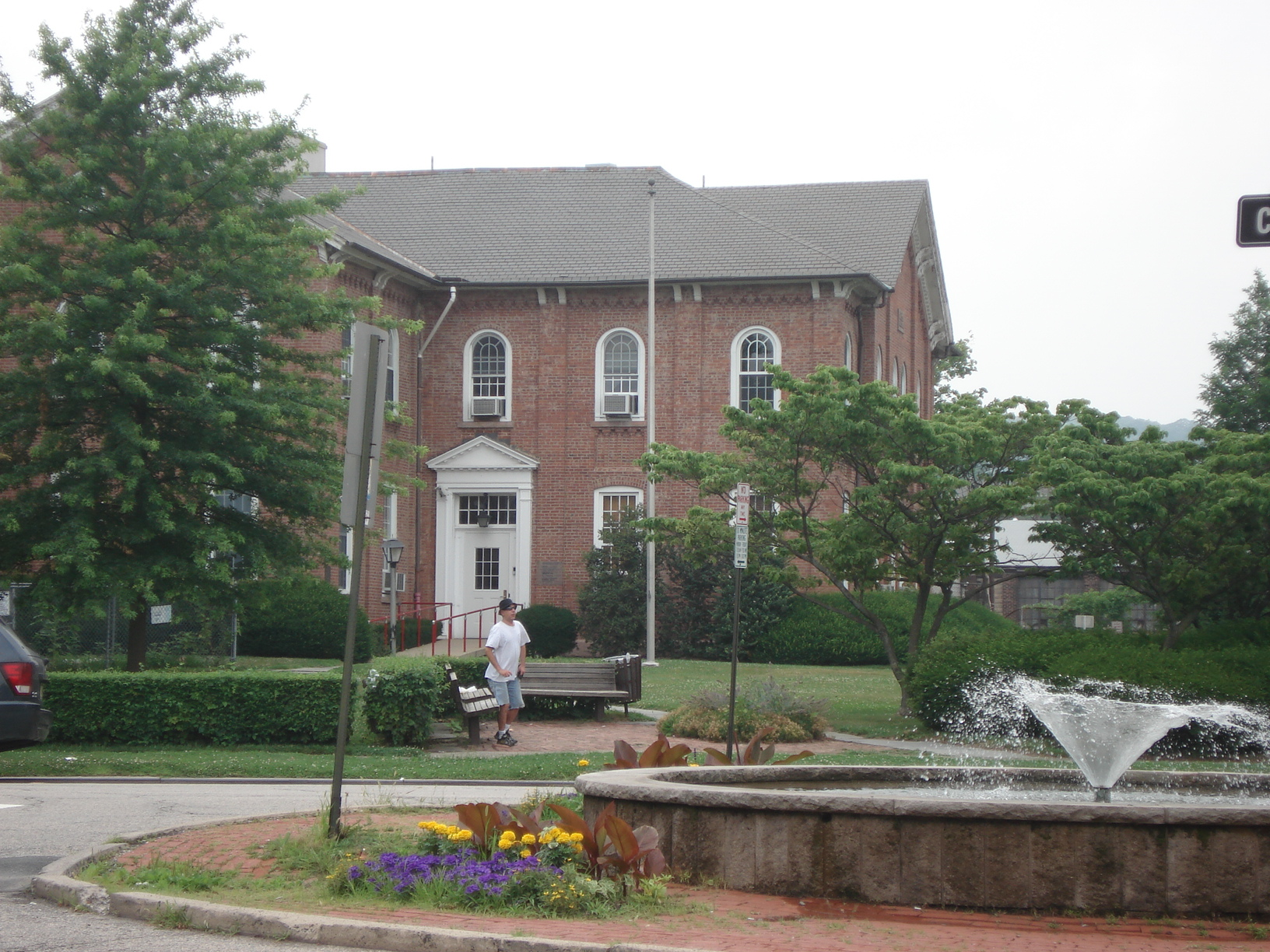
Board of Education Building

The Montclair Public Schools serve students in kindergarten through twelfth grade. The district consists of seven elementary schools, three middle schools, and one high school. As of the 2022–23 school year, the district, comprised of 11 schools, had an enrollment of 6,216 students and 564.6 classroom teachers (on an FTE basis), for a student–teacher ratio of 11.0:1. Schools in the district (with 2022–23 enrollment data from the National Center for Education Statistics) are Bradford Elementary School (375 students in grades K-5), Charles H. Bullock Elementary School (428, K-5), Edgemont Elementary School (255, K-5), Hillside Elementary School (581, 3–5), Nishuane Elementary School (412, PreK-2), Northeast Elementary School (374, K-5), Watchung Elementary School (385, K-5), Buzz Aldrin Middle School (607, 6–8), Renaissance Middle School at the Rand Building (201, 6–8) and Montclair High School (1,961; 9–12).

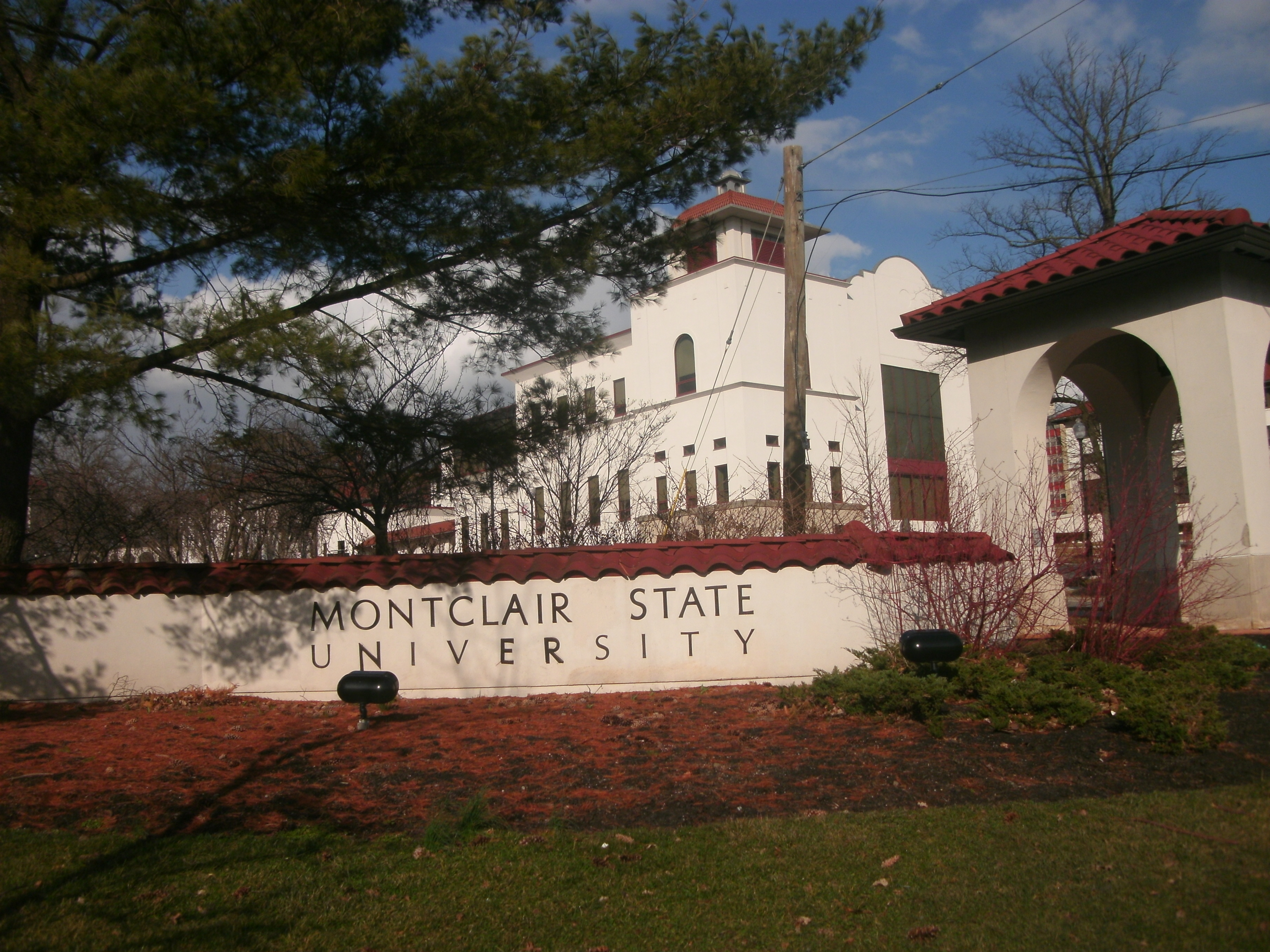
Main entrance to Montclair State University

Montclair is home to Montclair State University, which was founded in 1908 as the New Jersey State Normal School at Montclair.

The Roman Catholic Archdiocese of Newark supervises the operation of Lacordaire Academy (for girls) at the high school level and Lacordaire Academy Lower Division and St. Cassian School for grades Pre-K–8. In 2016, St. Cassian School was one of ten schools in New Jersey, and one of four private schools in the state, recognized as a National Blue Ribbon School by the United States Department of Education, a recognition celebrating excellence in academics. the diocese operated Immaculate Conception High School (coed) until it closed in 2025.

Montclair is also home to a host of public and private schools, including Montclair Kimberley Academy, Montclair Community Pre-K, Montclair Cooperative School, Virginia Harkness Sawtelle Learning, Maria Montessori Early Learning, Trinity Academy, and Deron School II.

== Infrastructure ==
=== Transportation ===
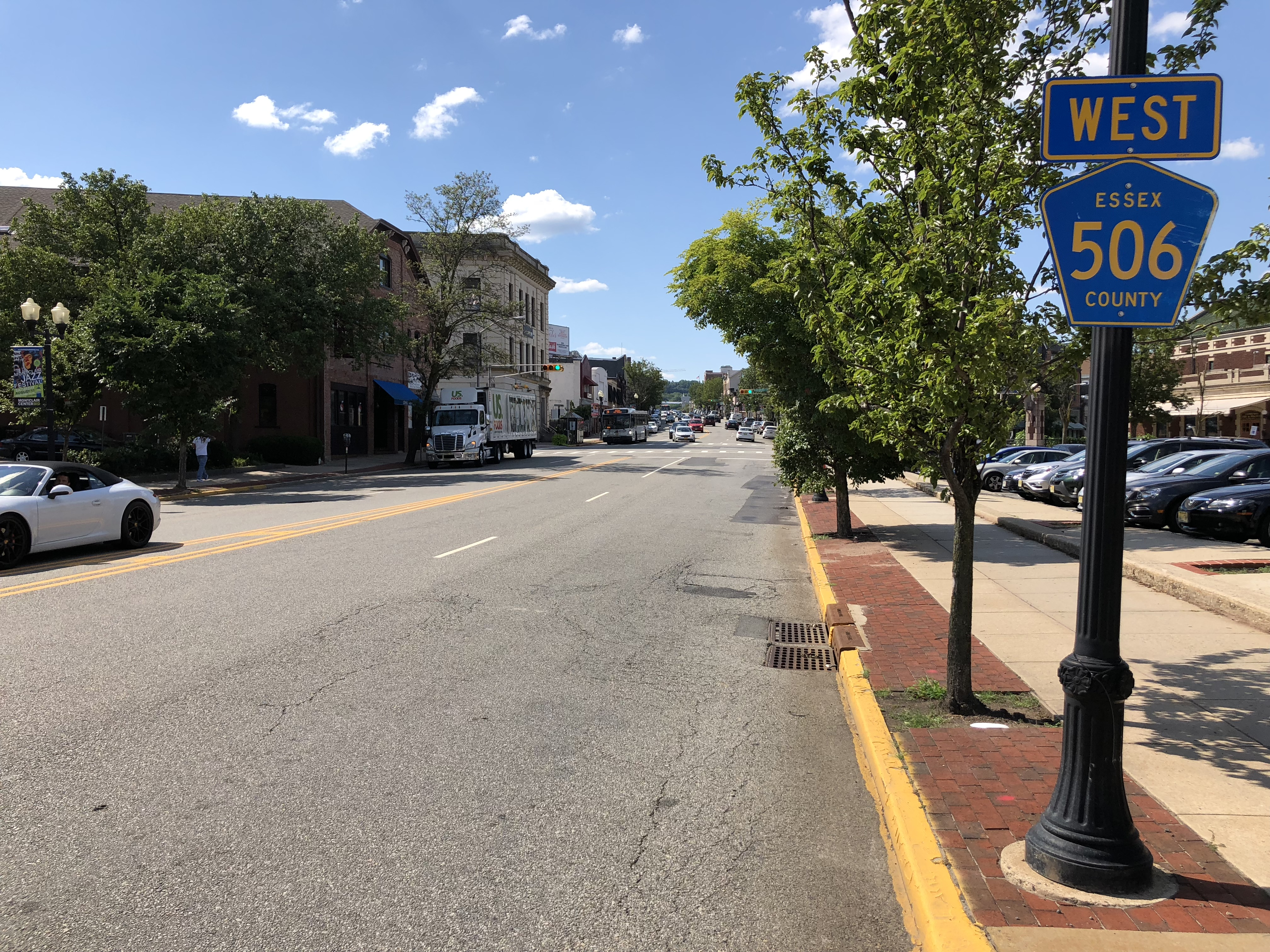
County Route 506 (Bloomfield Avenue) westbound in Montclair

Montclair is considered a commuter suburb of New York City. NJ Transit is the provider of public transportation. The average Montclair commute is 38 minutes each way. About 24% of commuters take mass transit, while 59% drive alone. Twelve times more Montclair commuters take mass transit than the national average.

==== Roads and highways ====
As of May 2010, the township had a total of 100.62 miles (161.93 km) of roadways, of which 86.68 miles (139.50 km) were maintained by the municipality and 13.94 miles (22.43 km) by Essex County Road Dept.

Major roads in the township include County Route 506 (Bloomfield Avenue).

There is a taxi stand near Bloomfield Avenue in eastern Montclair, in front of Lackawanna Plaza, formerly the Montclair train station.

==== Public transportation ====
===== Rail =====
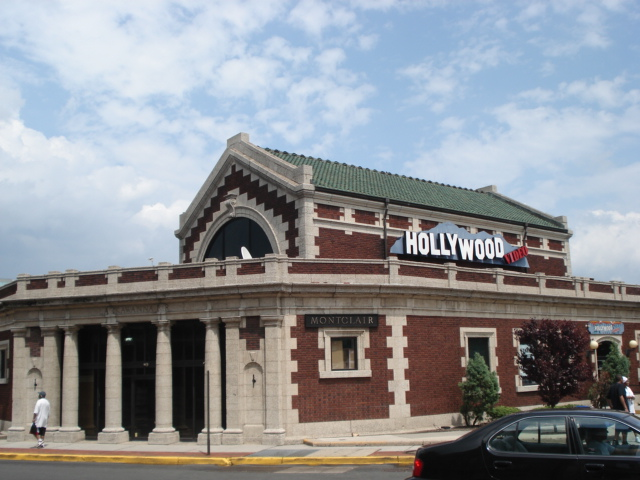
The former Lackawanna Railroad terminal, photographed when it housed a Hollywood Video store

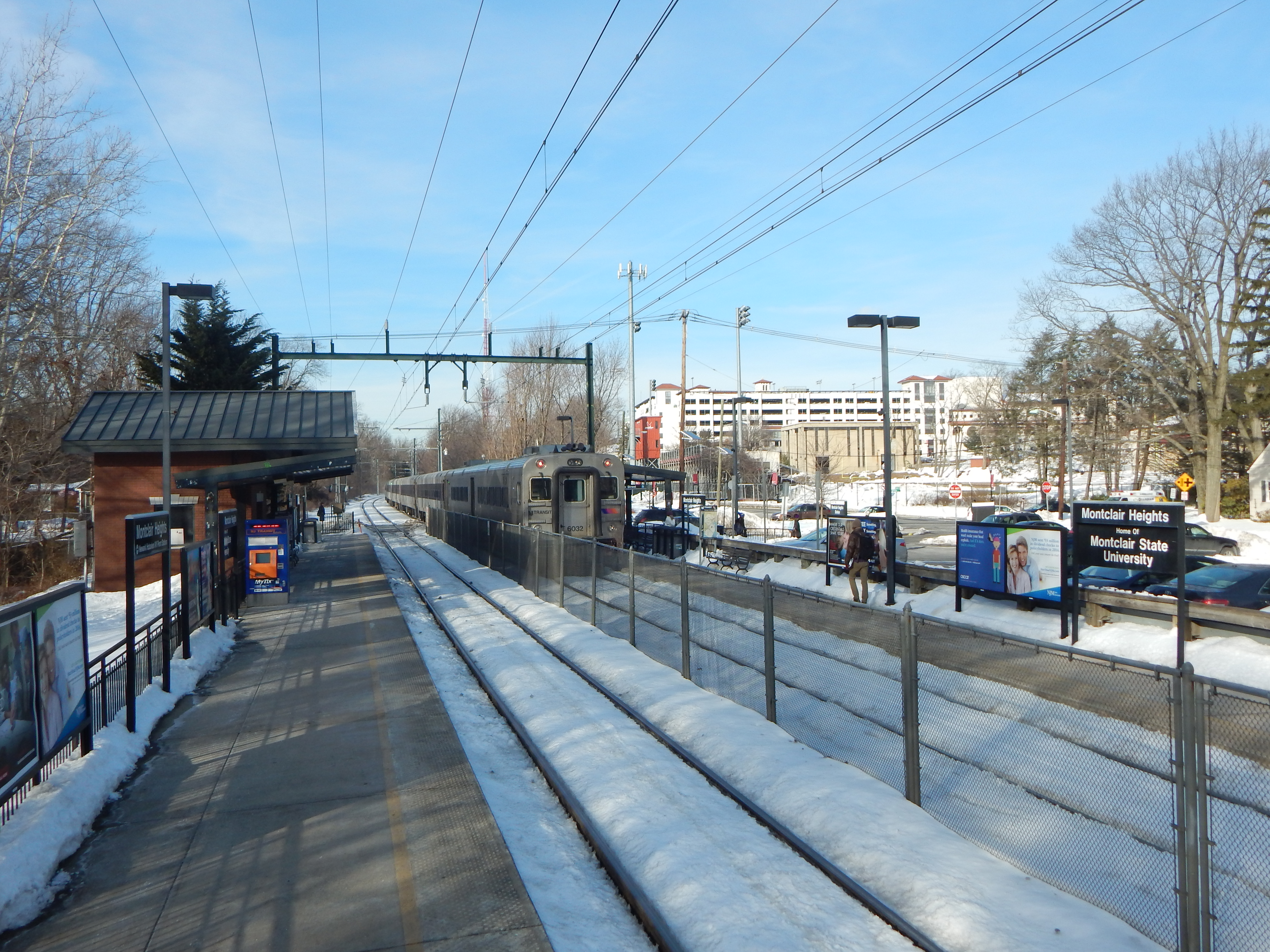
Montclair-Boonton Line at Montclair Heights station

Running through Montclair is the Montclair-Boonton Line, serving New York Penn Station and Hoboken Terminal to the east, and Hackettstown to the west. Seven NJ Transit Rail stations serve Montclair: Bay Street, Walnut Street, Watchung Avenue, Upper Montclair, Mountain Avenue, and Montclair Heights in Montclair, and Montclair State University station in the Great Notch area of Little Falls. Only Bay Street station has weekend train service.

Montclair has a long history of railroads. The first railroad to Montclair was built in 1856 by the Newark and Bloomfield Railroad. It terminated at a station in Downtown Montclair. First the Morris and Essex Railroad, then the Delaware, Lackawanna and Western Railroad leased the line.

In 1868, the Montclair Railway built another line through Montclair, which caused disputes leading to Montclair's separation from Bloomfield. Shortly afterward it was taken over by the New York and Greenwood Lake Railway, a subsidiary of the Erie Railroad. A third railroad to Morristown was planned in 1860 and construction began, but the Panic of 1873 ended the project. In 1912 the Lackawanna Railroad built a large terminal at the end of their line. The Erie and Lackawanna Railroads later merged, forming the Erie-Lackawanna Railroad, which operated both lines for many decades. They were next operated by Conrail for approximately one year, after which NJ Transit took over passenger operations and Conrail continued freight operations. Meanwhile, the 1912 terminal was closed in 1981 and converted into shops. This station was replaced by the Bay Street station. In 2002, the two railway lines were connected with the construction of the Montclair Connection.

===== Bus =====
NJ Transit buses 11, 28, 29, 34, 97, 191, and 705 run through Montclair, most going along the main street, Bloomfield Avenue. The NJ transit bus routes are:

- #11 from Downtown Newark through Verona, Cedar Grove, and Little Falls to Willowbrook Mall in Wayne. The only Montclair street it goes along is Bloomfield Avenue.
- #28 follows the route of #29 on Bloomfield Avenue until halfway through Montclair, where it goes north along Park Street, Watchung Avenue, and Valley Road to Montclair State University, and to Willowbrook Mall on weekends.
- #29 between West Caldwell and Newark, passing through Caldwell, Verona, Montclair, Glen Ridge, and Bloomfield on Bloomfield Avenue. It goes to Parsippany at rush hour. The only Montclair street it goes along is Bloomfield Avenue.
- #34 to Newark through East Orange and Orange on some trips; otherwise it goes to Bloomfield along Orange Road, Elm Street, and Bloomfield Avenue. It goes farther to the Montclair High School during that school's start and end times.
- #97 goes from the Montclair Center south along Orange and Harrison Roads through the Oranges.
- #191 goes from Willowbrook Mall through Little Falls to Montclair State University, then to the Port Authority Bus Terminal in Midtown Manhattan.
- #705 goes from Passaic along Alexander Avenue, Grove Street (for one block), Mt. Hebron Road, and through Montclair State University to Willowbrook Mall.

All of these routes except #97, #191, and #705 were trolley lines originally, operated by the Public Service Railway. A trolley garage existed on Bloomfield Avenue. In the 1930s and 1950s, the trolleys were destroyed and replaced with buses.

DeCamp Bus Lines routes 33 and 66 ran through Montclair to the Port Authority Bus Terminal in New York City until April 2023, carrying primarily commuters.

- #33 went along Bloomfield Avenue, with some buses going onto Grove Street
- #66 went along Orange Road, Park Street, Valley Road, and Mt. Hebron Road

Montclair State University has shuttle buses going around its campus.

The township of Montclair formerly operated its own jitney in the evening, from the Bay Street train station to the southern end of Montclair.

=== Healthcare ===
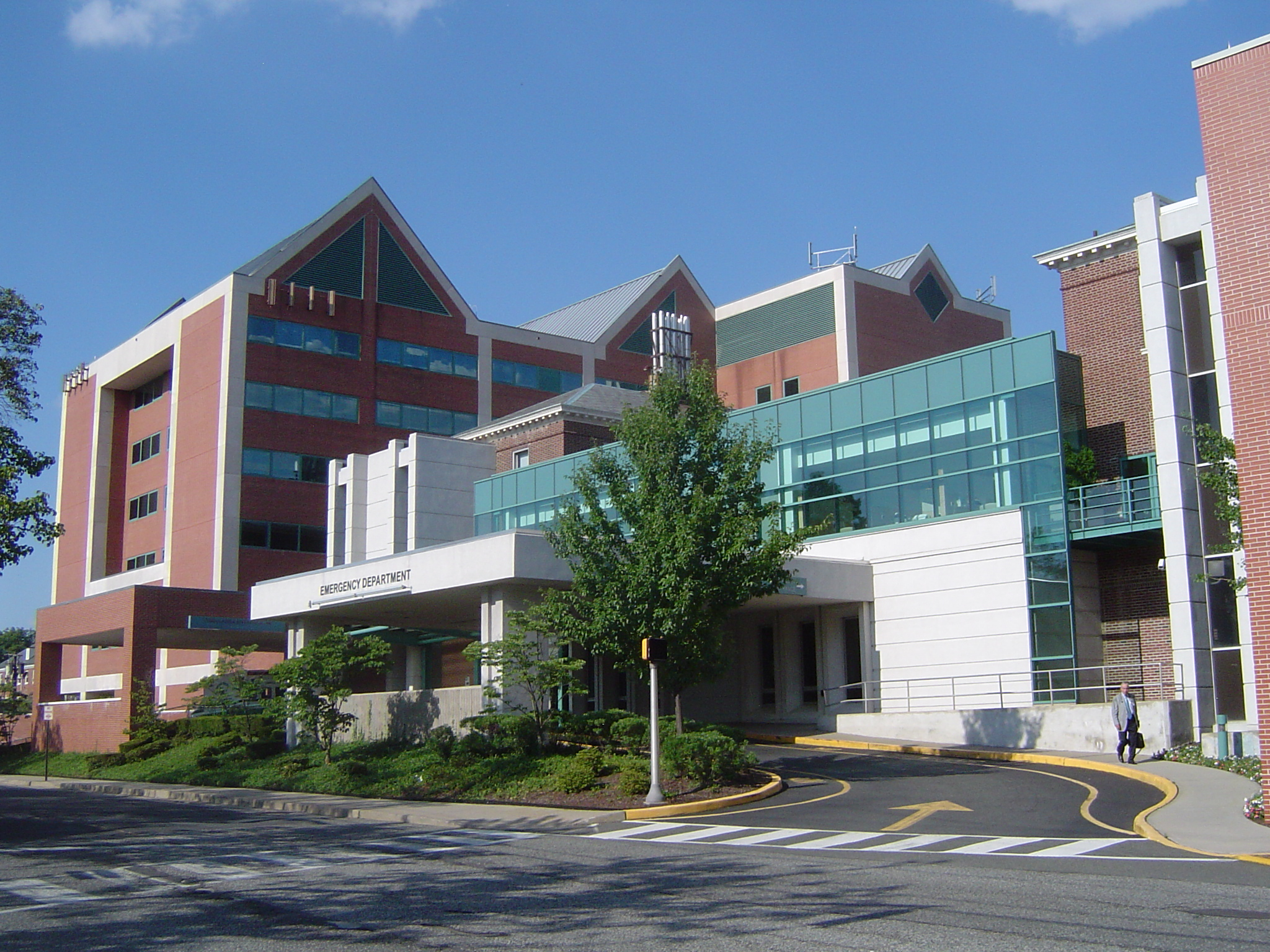
Mountainside Medical Center

Mountainside Medical Center, also known as Mountainside Hospital, is a 398-bed acute-care hospital located in Montclair that serves Northern Essex County. A part of the Hackensack Meridian Health, Mountainside Hospital is one of only two for-profit hospitals in New Jersey. It is also a clinical campus and affiliate of the New York Institute of Technology College of Osteopathic Medicine and provides clinical clerkship education for the medical school's osteopathic medical students. As of 2020, Mountainside Hospital provides 12 specialties and hosts 47 full-time interns and residents.

=== Housing ===
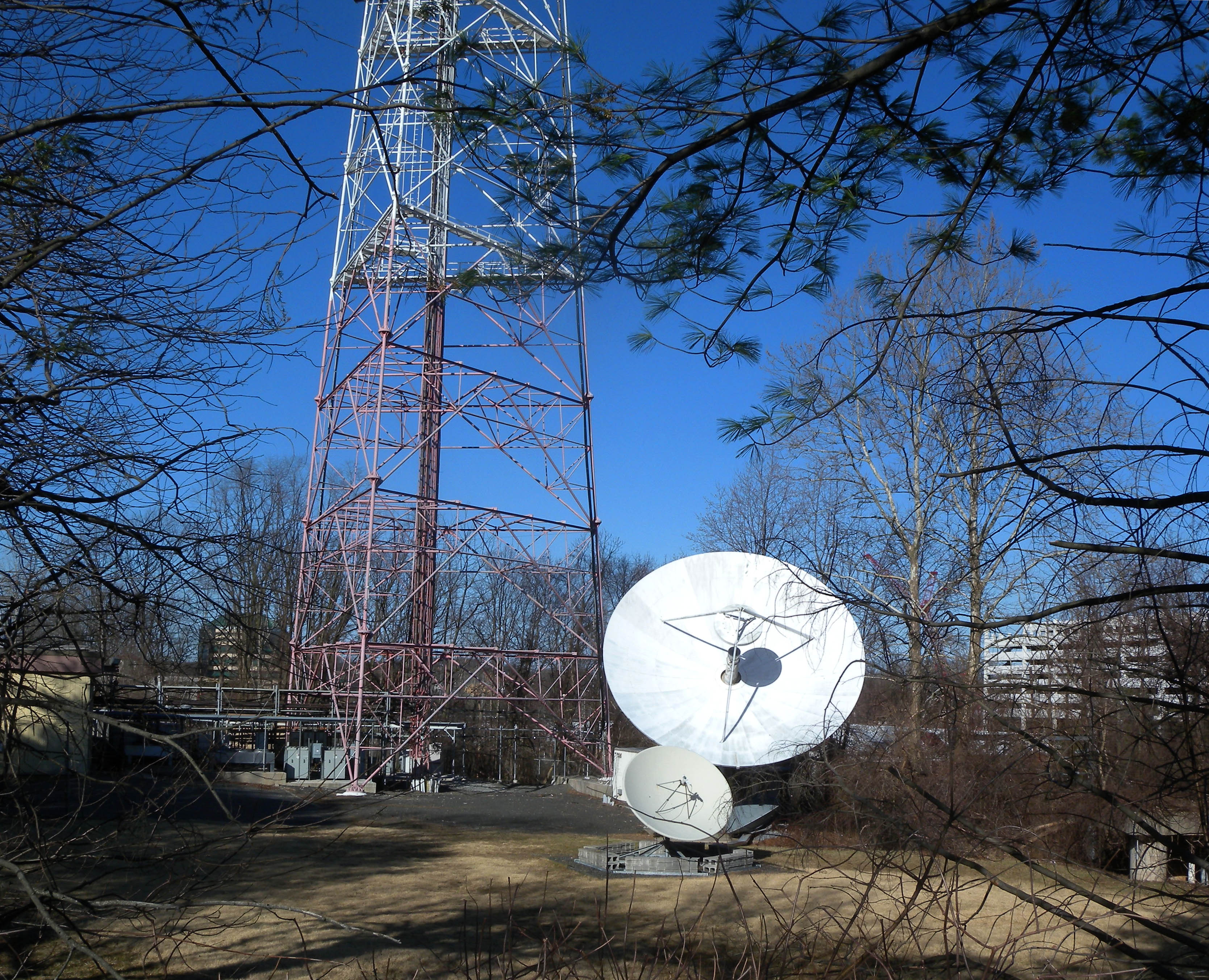
WNJN-TV transmitter site

Montclair is noted for its historic architecture. It is home to six historic districts listed on the Register of Historic Places of both the state and country as a whole, 92 individually listed landmarks, and two locally designated commercial districts. Works by significant architects include designs by Van Vleck and Goldsmith, Charles Follen McKim, McKim, Mead, and White, Henry Hudson Holly, Charles A. Platt, Alexander Jackson Davis, Dudley Van Antwerp, Effingham R. North, Montrose Morris, and Frances Nelson, among others.

In 2018, Bobbi Brown, founder and ex-CCO of Bobbi Brown Cosmetics, and her husband, realtor Steven Plofker opened The George, a 32-room boutique hotel on North Mountain Avenue that was originally a private home constructed in 1902.

Montclair has also housed many hotels, such as the defunct Hotel Montclair. In 2013, plans were announced to bring a new hotel to Montclair, featuring 100 rooms and a liquor license.

=== Public safety ===
==== Montclair Fire Department ====
The Montclair Fire Department is a career fire department that provides coverage to the Township of Montclair and Borough of Glen Ridge, a coverage area 7.53 square miles and a combined population of 48,743. The department is run by Fire Chief Robert Duncan and currently has two fire stations in operation. The department currently has a staffing level sitting at approximately 70, including one Fire Chief, two Deputy Chiefs, four Battalion Chiefs. The department is divided into an operations section and an administrative section, both led by a Deputy Chief, the operations section is split into four groups which staff the on-duty apparatus, the administration section has an Office of Fire Prevention which employs a Fire Official, and subordinate fire inspectors as well as part time secretaries. The department's personnel are represented by the FMBA Local 20, a subordinate of the New Jersey Firefighters Mutual Benevolent Association. With a minimum daily staffing at 14, reduced recently from 16 to 17. The department has an annual call volume of 2,282 with an annual increase of around 4.5%. Emergency calls are dispatched through the Montclair Police Department communications center which is located in fire headquarters.

- Department History
  - The Montclair History website has a well put together history of the Montclair Fire Department that is available on the Montclair History website.
- Fire Stations
  - Fire Station 1 (Fire Department Headquarters) - Pine St, Montclair, NJ 07042
  - Fire Station 2 - 588 Valley Road, Montclair, NJ 07043
- Fire Prevention Bureau
  - The bureau is led by Fire Official Lieutenant Justin Thompson.
  - The bureau is responsible for fire service activity that involves a decrease in the incidence of uncontrolled fire. Members of the bureau conduct inspections which includes engineering, code code enforcement, public fire safety education and fire investigations. They also are responsible for all fire investigation and fire department statistics.
- Department Apparatus
  - On duty for each group the department staffs the following apparatus:
    - Engine 1 (Station 1)
    - Engine 2 (Station 2)
    - Engine 3 (Station 1)
    - Truck 1 (Station 1)
    - Truck 2 (Station 2) - This truck has been Browned Out.
    - Rescue 1 (Station 1) - This is not staffed full time, it is cross staffed and staffed when needed.
    - Battalion Chief
- Medical Response
  - The Montclair Fire Department handles a minimal number of medical calls. Most medical calls are handled by the Montclair Ambulance Unit but in the case of forced entry, extrication, lift assists or other requests by the Montclair Ambulance Unit the fire department is dispatched to assist with the call.
  - All members in the department maintain a minimum certification level of Emergency Medical Responder.
- Mutual Aid
  - The town receives fire service mutual aid from many towns, you can view a full list here along with the terms of the agreement.

== Sister cities ==
Montclair's sister cities are:

- Aquilonia, Italy
- Barnet, London, United Kingdom
- Graz, Austria

In 2022, the town ended its relationship with the city of Cherepovets, in protest against the invasion of Ukraine by Russia.

== Points of interest ==
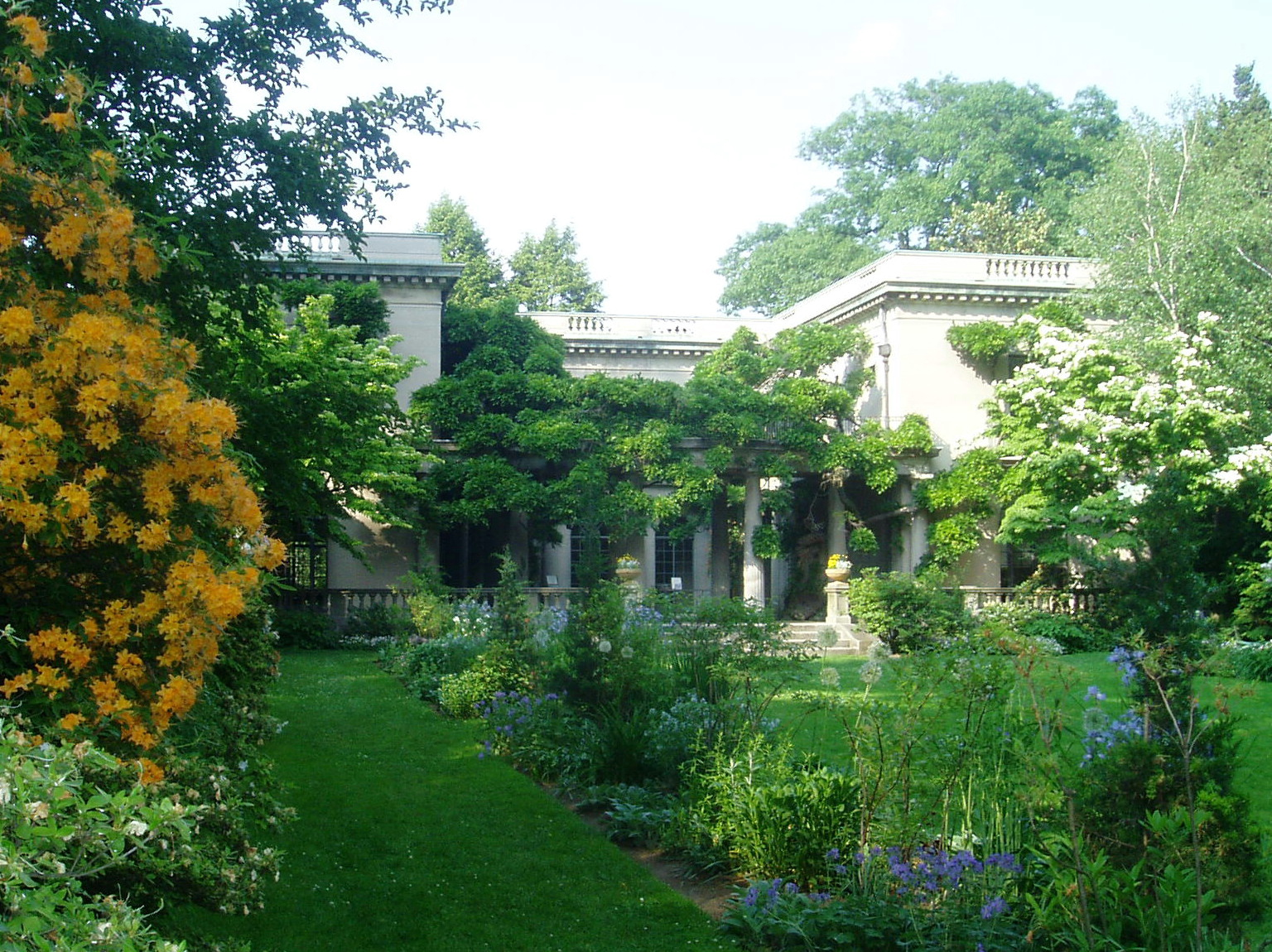
Van Vleck House and Gardens

- Montclair Art Museum
- Howard Van Vleck Arboretum
- Presby Memorial Iris Gardens
- Van Vleck House and Gardens
- Crane House and Museum
- The Montclair History Center, which consists of:
  - Crane House and Historic YMCA
  - Clark House
- Yogi Berra Stadium and the Yogi Berra Museum and Learning Center
- Revolutionary War site markers for the temporary headquarters of Marquis de Lafayette and George Washington
  - Note: There is no written record to verify that Washington had spent time in Montclair (then called "Cranetown") or Upper Montclair (then called "Speertown") during the time period, but the story was passed down by generations orally and the two markers were placed in the 1900s.
- Brookdale Park
- Parks and dining in Upper Montclair

== Historic sites ==
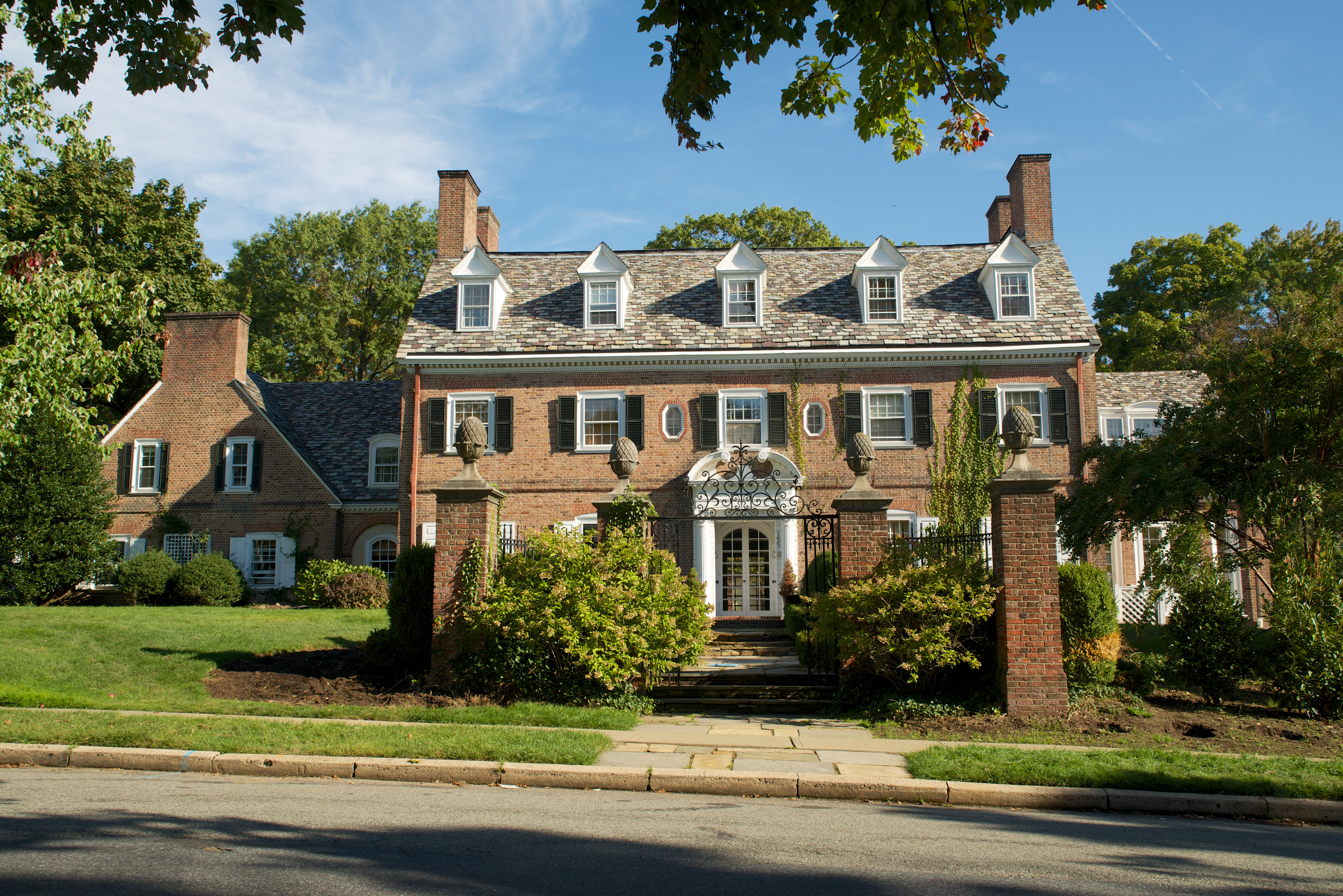
The Anchorage

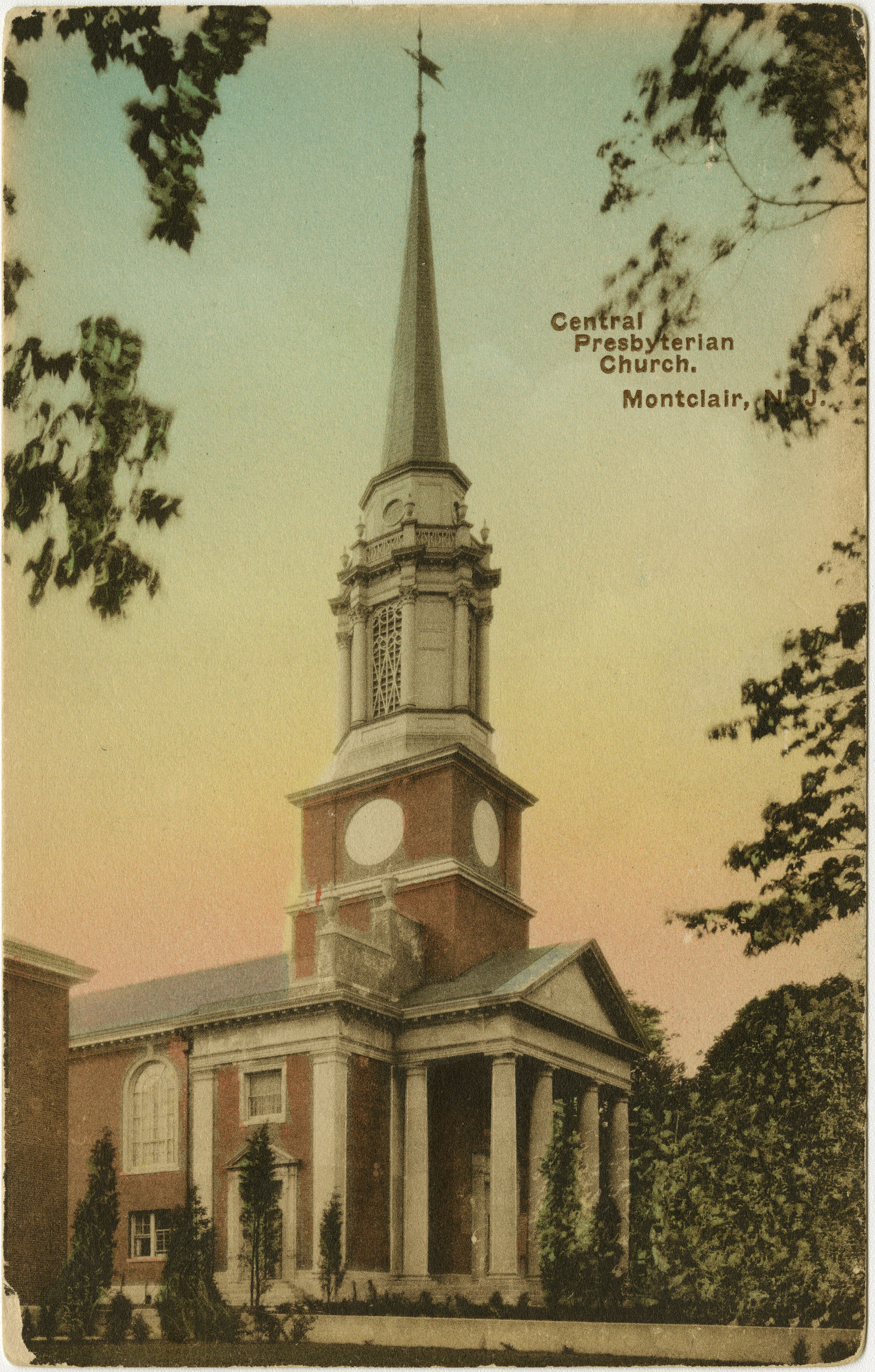
Central Presbyterian Church

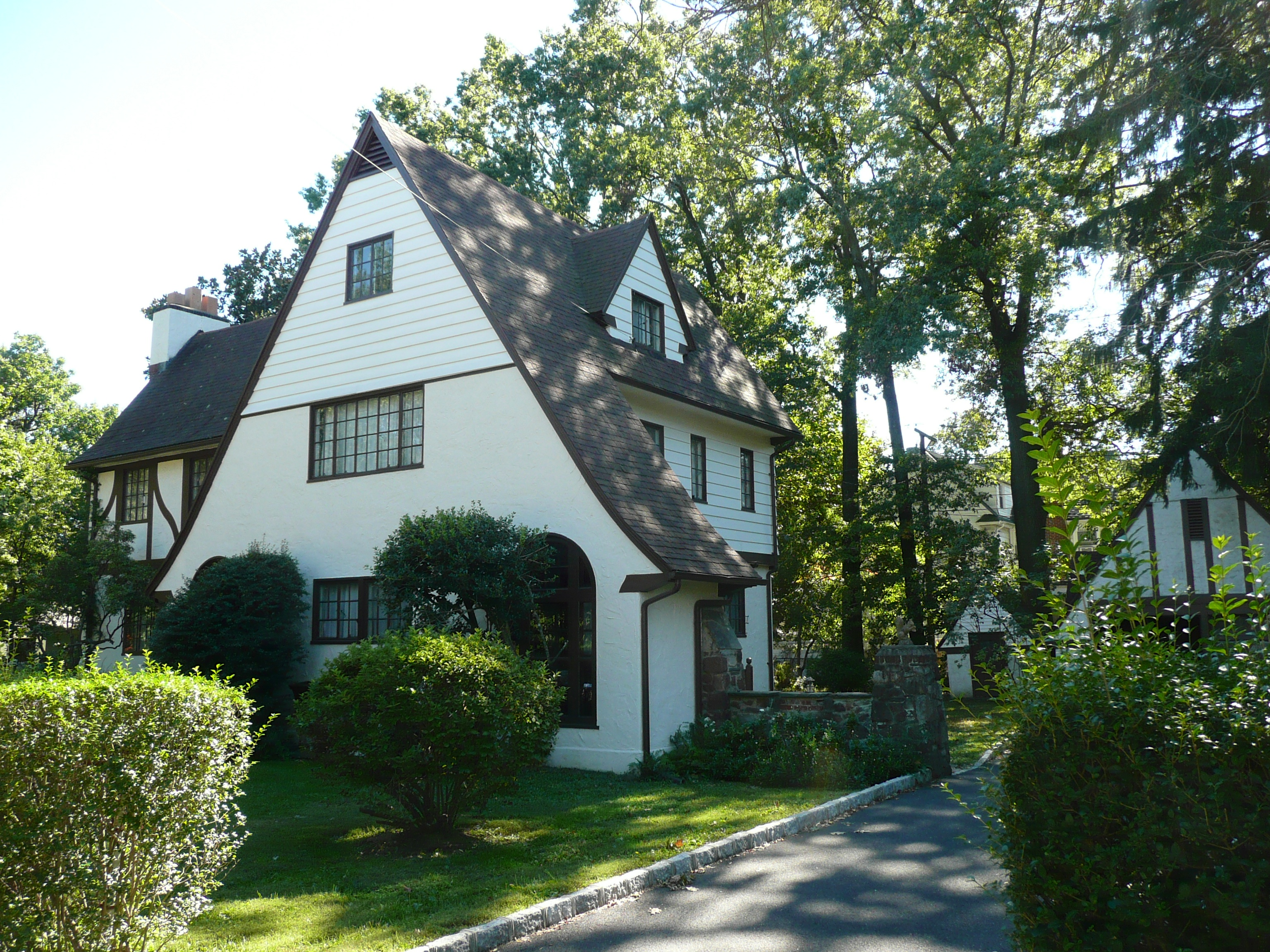
The House that Lives

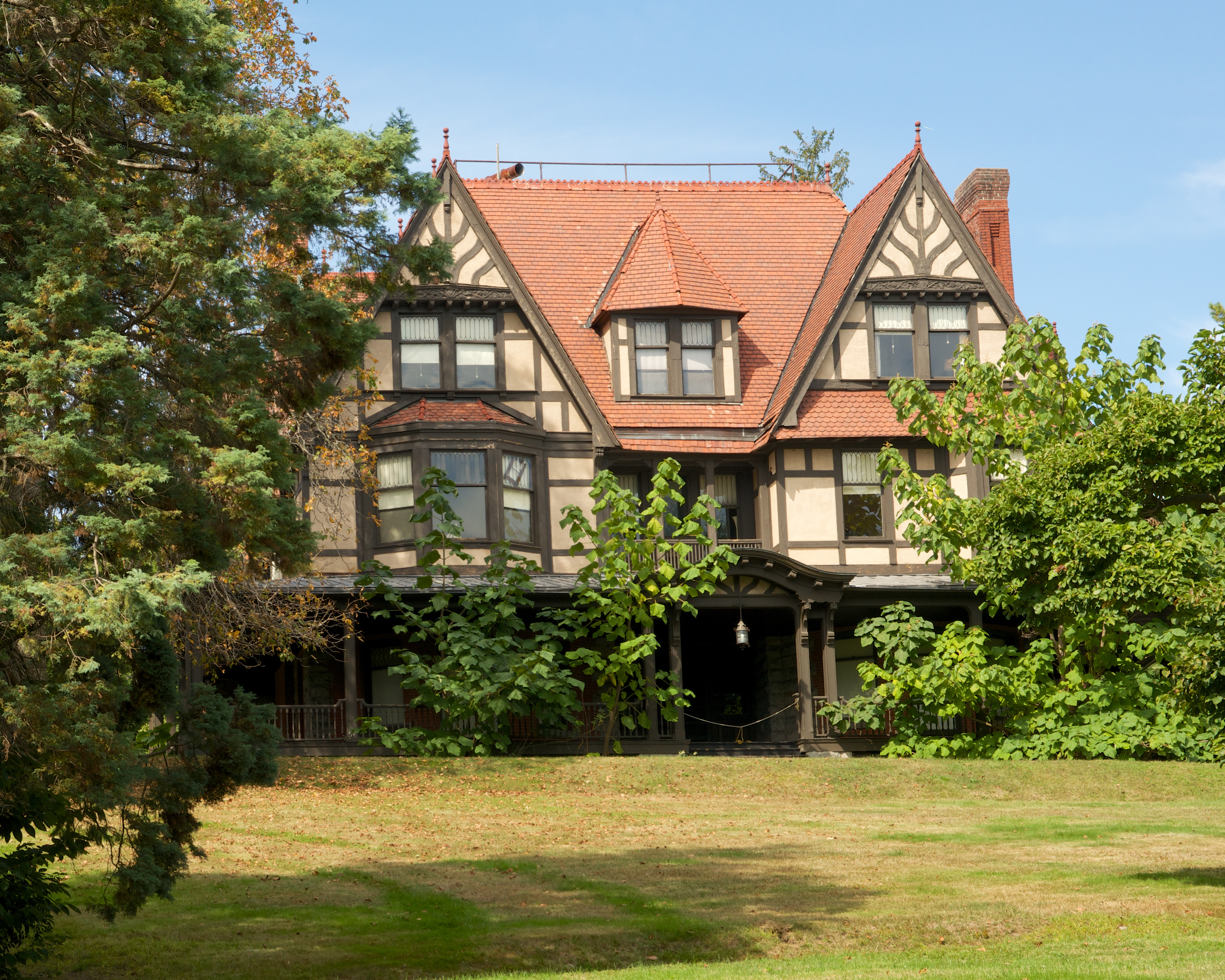
Charles S. Shultz House

Montclair is home to the following locations on the National Register of Historic Places:

- The Anchorage – 155 Wildwood Avenue (added 1988)
- Anderson Park – SE corner of Bellevue and North Mountain Avenue (added 2009)
- Joseph Bardsley House – 345 Park Street (added 1988)
- Bradner's Pharmacy – 33 Watchung Plaza (added 1988)
- Carnegie Library – Church Street at Valley Road (added 1988)
- Casa Deldra – 35 Afterglow Way (added 1988)
- Central Presbyterian Church – 46 Park Street (added 1986)
- J. M. Chapman House – 10 Rockledge (added 1988)
- Cliffside Hose Company No. 4 – 588 Valley Road (added 1988)
- Congregational Church – 42 South Fullerton Avenue (added 1988)
- Israel Crane House – 110 Orange Road(added 1973)
- Eastward – 50 Lloyd Road (added 1988)
- Egbert Farm – 128 North Mountain Avenue (added 1988)
- Henry Fenn House – 208 North Mountain Avenue (added 1988)
- First Methodist Episcopal Church – 24 North Fullerton Avenue (added 1988)
- Free Public Library, Upper Montclair Branch – 185 Bellevue Avenue (added 1988)
- Frank Goodwillie House – 17 Wayside Place (added 1988)
- Haskell's Bloomfield Villa – 84 Llewellyn Road (added 1988)
- House at 147 Park Street – 147 Park Street (added 1988)
- The House that Lives – 83 Watchung Avenue (added 1988)
- Marlboro Park Historic District – Roughly along Fairfield Street, Waterbury Road, Montclair Avenue, and Watchung Avenue between North Fullerton and Grove Streets (added 1988)
- Marsellis House – 190 Cooper Avenue (added 1988)
- Miller Street Historic District – Miller and Fulton Streets between Elmwood Avenue, Elm, and New Streets (added 1988)
- George A. Miller House – 275 Claremont Avenue (added 1988)
- Montclair Art Museum – 3 South Mountain Avenue (added 1986)
- Montclair Railroad Station – Lackawanna Plaza (added 1973)
- Mountain Avenue station – 451 Upper Mountain Avenue (added 1984)
- Mountain District – Roughly bounded by Highland, Bradford, Upper Mountain, and Claremont Avenue (added 1988)
- Mulford House – 207 Union Street (added 1988)
- Pine Street Historic District – Roughly bounded by Glenridge Avenue, the NJ Transit Boonton Line, Pine, and Baldwin Streets (added 2000)
- Post Office Building, Upper Montclair – 242–244 Bellevue Avenue (added 1988)
- Presby Memorial Iris Gardens Horticultural Center – 474 Upper Mountain Avenue (added 1980)
- M. F. Reading House – 87 Midland Avenue (added 1988)
- Red Gables – 99 South Fullerton Avenue (added 1988)
- Charles S. Shultz House – 30 North Mountain Avenue (added 1979)
- S. C. Smith House – 40 Northview Avenue (added 1988)
- St. Luke's Church – 69 South Fullerton Avenue (added 1988)
- Stone Eagles – 60 Undercliff Road (added 1988)
- Upper Montclair station – 275 Bellevue Avenue (added 1984)
- Van Reyper-Bond House – 848 Valley Road (added 1979)
- Von Schmid House – 580 Park Street (added 1988)
- Watchung Avenue station – Park Street (added 1984)
- Allyn Wight House – 75 Gates Avenue (added 1988)
