= Charles S. Shultz House =

Historic house in New Jersey, United States

- U.S. National Register of Historic Places
- New Jersey Register of Historic Places
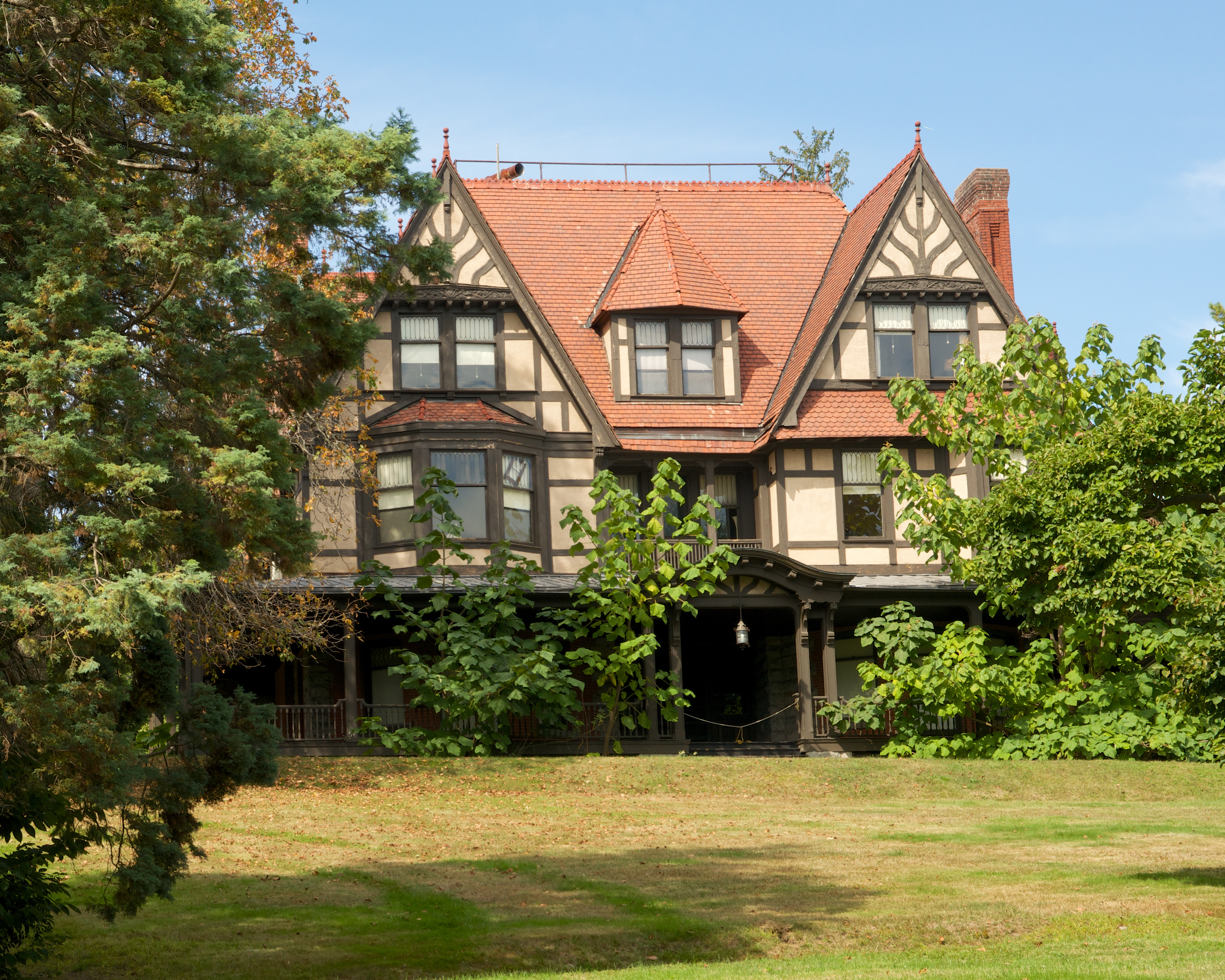

- Location within Essex County, New Jersey Location within New Jersey Location within the United States
- Location: 30 North Mountain Avenue, Montclair, New Jersey
- Coordinates: 40°49′17″N 74°13′24″W
- Area: 2.8 acres (1.1 ha)
- Built: 1896
- Architect: Michel Moracin LeBrun
- Architectural style: Queen Anne
- NRHP reference No.: 79001482
- NJRHP No.: 1175

Significant dates
- Added to NRHP: July 22, 1979
- Designated NJRHP: September 15, 1978

The Charles S. Shultz House, also known as Evergreens and now known as "Evergreens House", is a historic house located at 30 North Mountain Avenue in Montclair in Essex County, United States. It was built in 1896 and was added to the National Register of Historic Places on July 22, 1979, for its significance in architecture.

In the late 1800s, Montclair was changing from a farming community into a wealthy suburb due in part to many wealthy individuals moving from the cities, filled with pollution and crowded streets, to the suburbs, where there was plenty of clean air and open land. Charles S. Shultz, president of the Hoboken Savings Bank, was one of these individuals, moving to Montclair from Hoboken and building his home, Evergreens, in the flourishing city.

Built by New York architect Michel LeBrun, the three-story, 21-room mansion was built on the corner of North Mountain and Claremont Avenues in 1896. By 1952, the house had been passed on through three consecutive generations (Charles's daughter, Emily, being the second owner), leaving Shultz's granddaughter Marian (Molly) Shultz as the owner of the full property. In 1997 the house was bequeathed to the Montclair History Center (at the time the Montclair Historical Society) and turned into an historic house museum. With all of its original furnishings and family artifacts, the property encapsulated what a wealthy family's home would have looked like during the late 19th and early 20th centuries in Montclair, New Jersey.

Commissioned because of his impressive legacy of work - churches, New York firehouses, the once tallest building in America from 1909 to 1913, and most importantly the Hoboken Bank for Savings in 1890–Michel LeBrun took on the job of building the Shultz home. Earning its name of Evergreens from the evergreen trees that surrounded the property, the forty foot building drew several different inspirations based on Shultz's experiences in Europe. Asymmetrical with uneven windows, an arched hood, and a veranda were suited to Shultz and to the style of the time. The first floor is made predominantly of masonry in fear of a fire happening. Wanting to incorporate what was considered at the time advanced technology, Shultz wanted his home to have gas and electric lighting, an electric burglar alarm, an enunciator system, an elevator, a heating system, the most current plumbing, and ice box but cautioned the potential dangers of each technology in his home. He took on safety precautions, allowing the house to still remain today.

The Charles Shultz House was operated as a historic house museum by the Montclair History Center from 1997 to 2021.

Today the Shultz house is no longer a museum. It is now a private home.

== See also ==
- National Register of Historic Places listings in Essex County, New Jersey
