= Montrose Park Historic District =

Historic district in New Jersey, United States

- U.S. National Register of Historic Places
- U.S. Historic district
- New Jersey Register of Historic Places
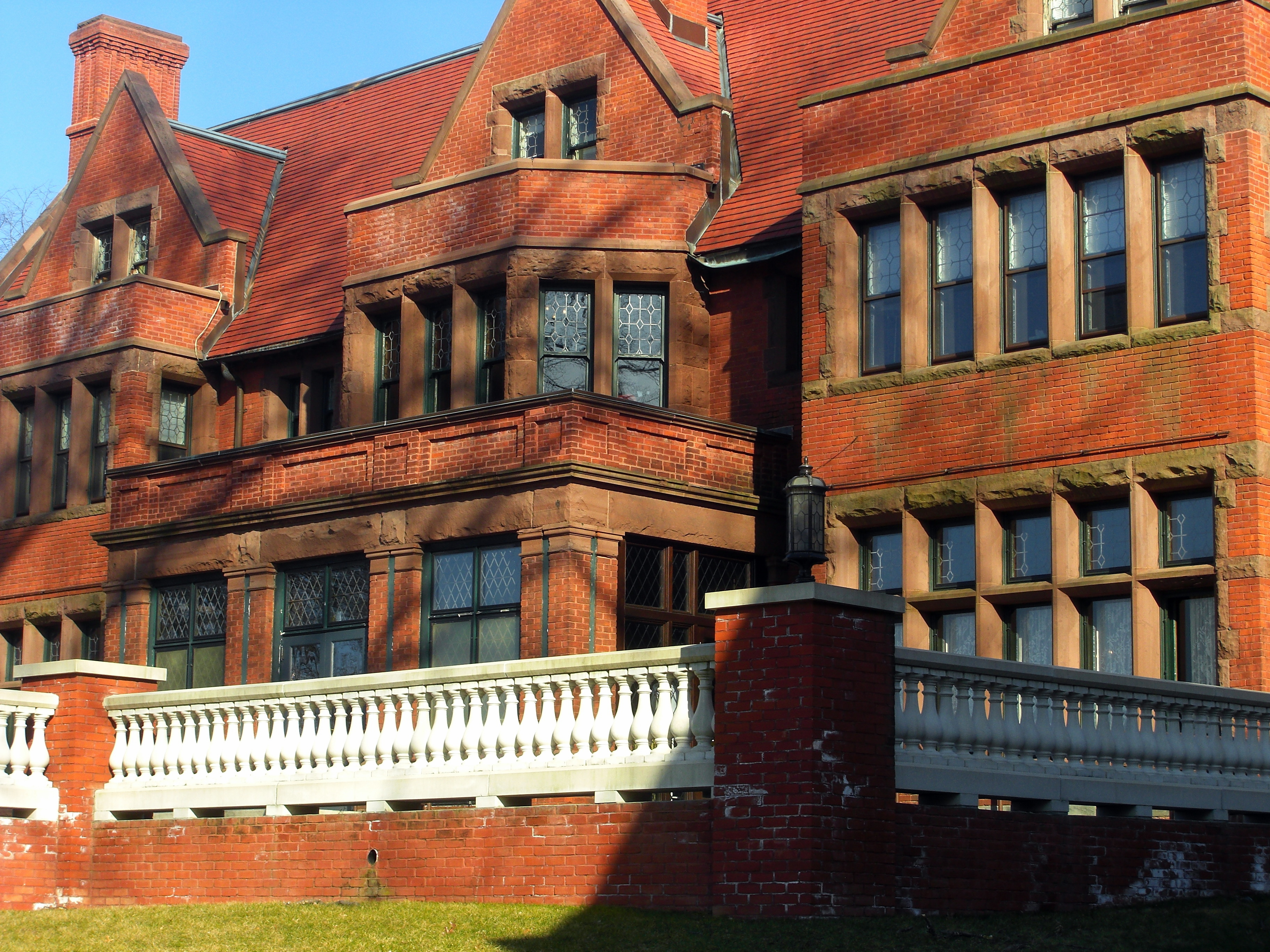
- The Kip-Riker House by Henry Ives Cobb

- Location within Essex County, New Jersey Location within New Jersey Location within the United States
- Location: South Orange, Sanford, and Heywood Aves., and Holland Rd., South Orange, New Jersey
- Coordinates: 40°44′57″N 74°14′52″W
- Built: c. 1870–c. 1930
- Architect: Multiple
- Architectural style: Colonial Revival, Shingle Style, Queen Anne
- NRHP reference No.: 97000978
- NJRHP No.: 3147

Significant dates
- Added to NRHP: August 29, 1997
- Designated NJRHP: July 16, 1997

Montrose Park Historic District is a historic district located in South Orange, Essex County, New Jersey, United States. The buildings in the district were built between c. 1870 and c. 1930 and were added to the National Register of Historic Places on August 29, 1997.

== History ==
Montrose Park is primarily a residential neighborhood, located in the northeast corner of the township of South Orange. The general geographic boundaries are the Morris and Essex Railroad on the west, the municipal boundary between the City of Orange and the Village of South Orange on the north, the municipal boundary with the City of Newark on the east, and South Orange Avenue on the south. The neighborhood is characterized by elegant, large-scale homes, dating from the last quarter of the 19th century into the 1930s. The houses are set on large, landscaped lots, outlined by bluestone sidewalks and curbs, framed by mature trees and shrubbery, and lit by gaslight.

Several of the streets were originally developed by John Gorham Vose and Henry A. Page between 1867 and 1874 as part of a residential development called Montrose, intended to attract wealthy New York businessmen to rural South Orange. After 1891, a number of other streets were developed by Thomas A. Kingman (as Montrose Park), who insisted that lots measure no less than 100 by 200.

Within the historic district, there are 900 contributing buildings (mostly single family dwellings), 229 noncontributing buildings, and 1 contributing site. Of the key buildings, two, the Old Stone House and Mountain Station, are already listed on the National Register of Historic Places. Except for two synagogues and one school, most of the primary buildings are residential.

=== Architectural styles ===
Montrose Park contains a collection of Victorian and period revival architecture, dating from 1870 to 1930, with some earlier exceptions. The most commonly represented styles include the Colonial Revival, with Georgian, Adam and Dutch Colonial influences the most dominant, followed by the Shingle Style. The following styles are also represented, in descending order of frequency: Tudor Revival, Queen Anne, Italian Renaissance Revival, Italianate, French Second Empire, Mission, Romanesque Revival, French Eclectic, medievalizing, Art Deco and Gothic Revival.

=== Extant properties ===
- Old Stone House, at 219 South Orange Avenue, c. 1670 (rebuilt 1773).
- Abel Ward House, at 497 South Orange Avenue, 1785.
- Benjamin Baldwin House (also known as the House with the White Chimneys), at 311 Centre Street, 1804.
- Kip-Riker House (known as "Montrose"), at 432 Scotland Road, designed by Henry Ives Cobb for Ira A. Kip Jr., 1903.
- Mrs. N. V. L'Hommedieu House, by Dillon, McLellan & Beadel, c. 1914.
- Clarence Bonynge House, by Davis, McGrath & Kiessling, c. 1916
- John McElroy House, by Davis, McGrath & Kiessling c. 1916
- Carl F. Stiefel House, at 150 Scotland Road, c. 1920
- Edward Gregory House, at 470 Berkeley Ave., 1922.
- Marshall Elementary School, at 262 Grove Rd., by Guilbert and Betelle, c. 1922.
- A.L. Browne House, at 253 Highland Rd., by Stanley and Wheeler, c. 1928.

=== Demolished properties ===
- The Arthur Burtis Leach House ("Pleasant Home"), at 321 Scotland Road by George W. Maher, (Note: George W. Maher also designed the Frederick Taylor Gates House, at 66 South Mountain Avenue in nearby Montclair, New Jersey, 1902.) 1899.

=== Nearby properties ===
- South Orange Village Hall, by Rossiter & Wright, South Orange Avenue and Scotland Road, 1894; it is immediately outside the boundaries of the historic district.

== Gallery ==
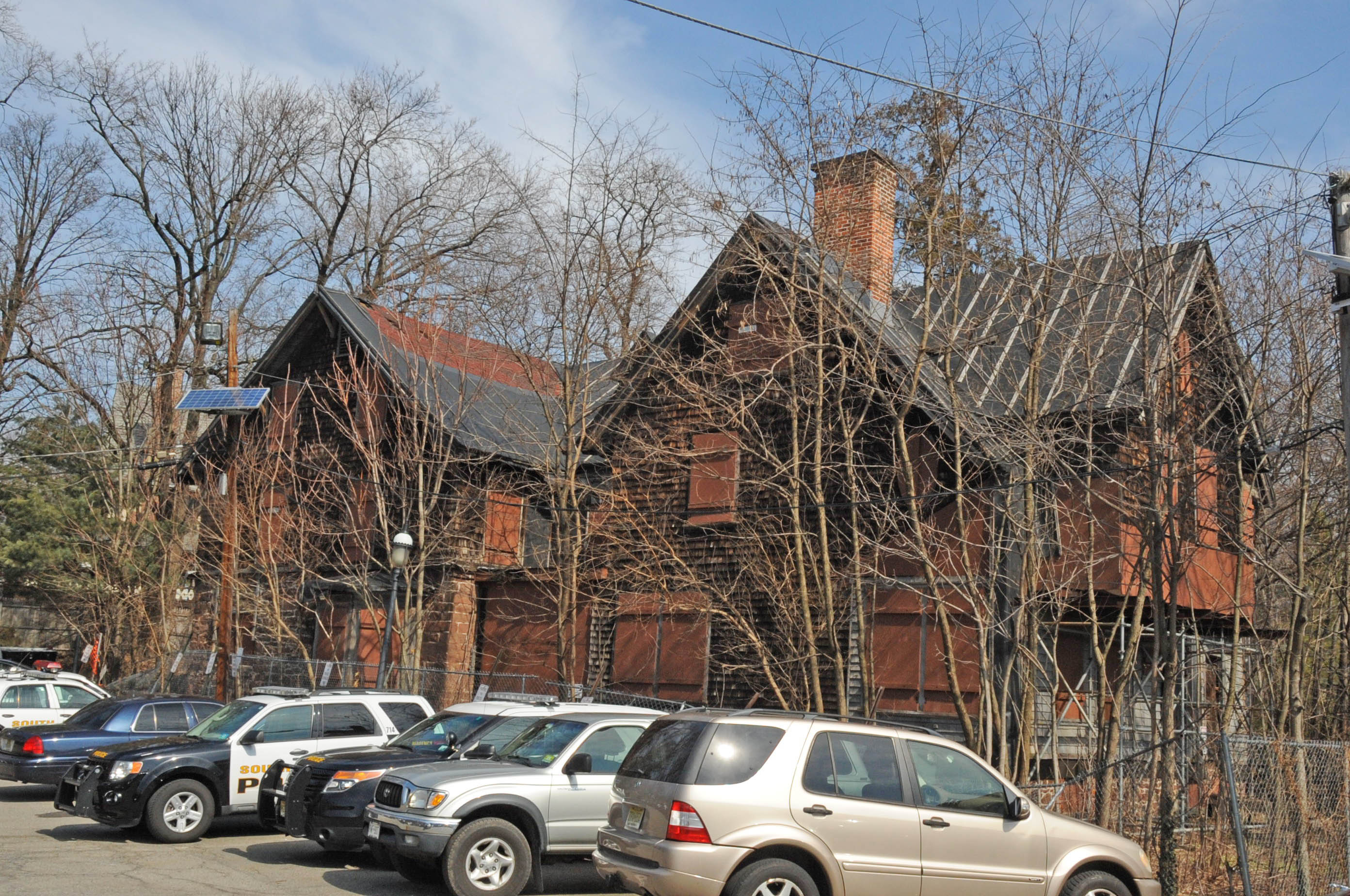
Old Stone House, c. 1670 (rebuilt 1773)

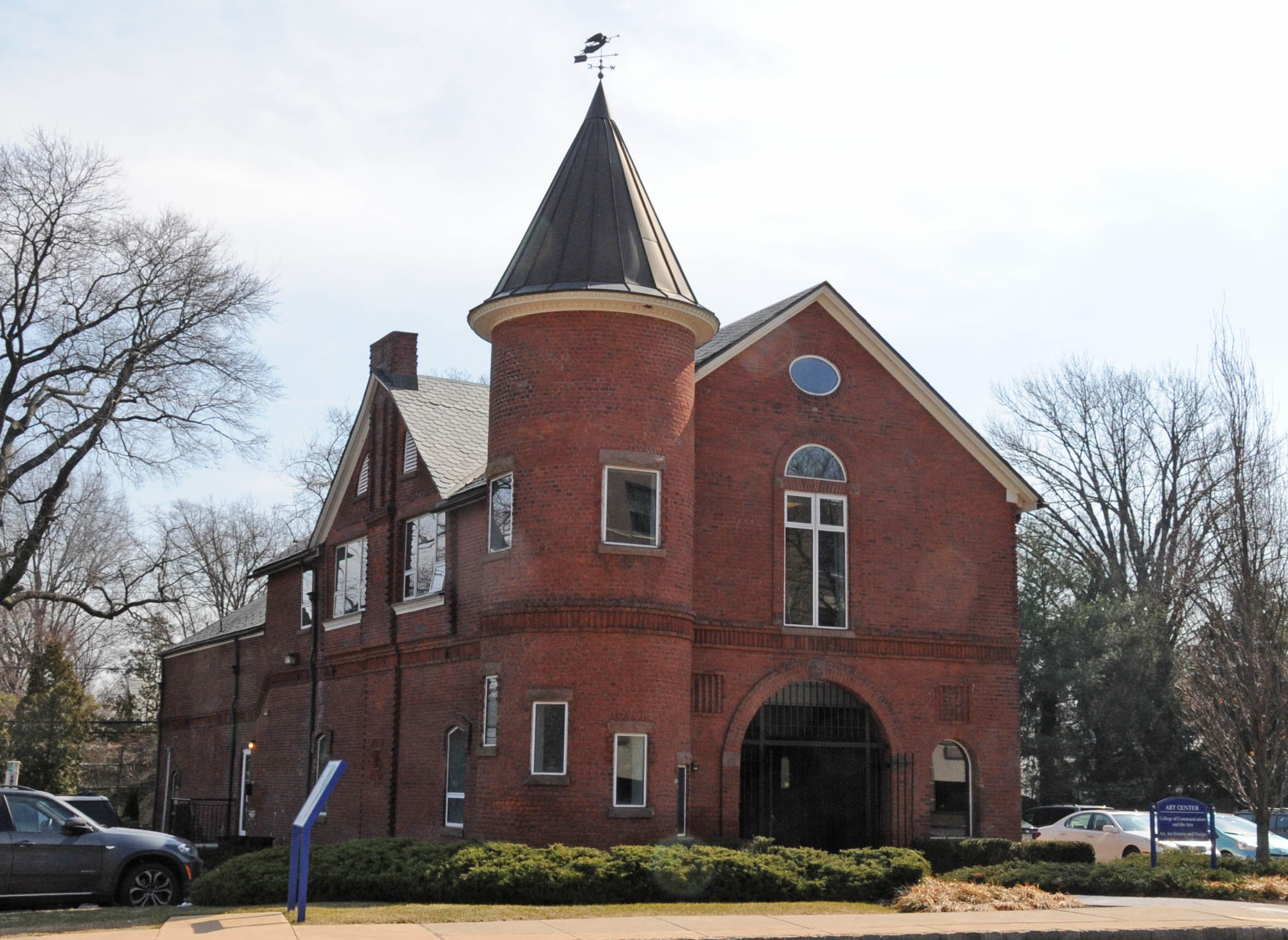
Eugene V. Kelly Carriage House, 1887

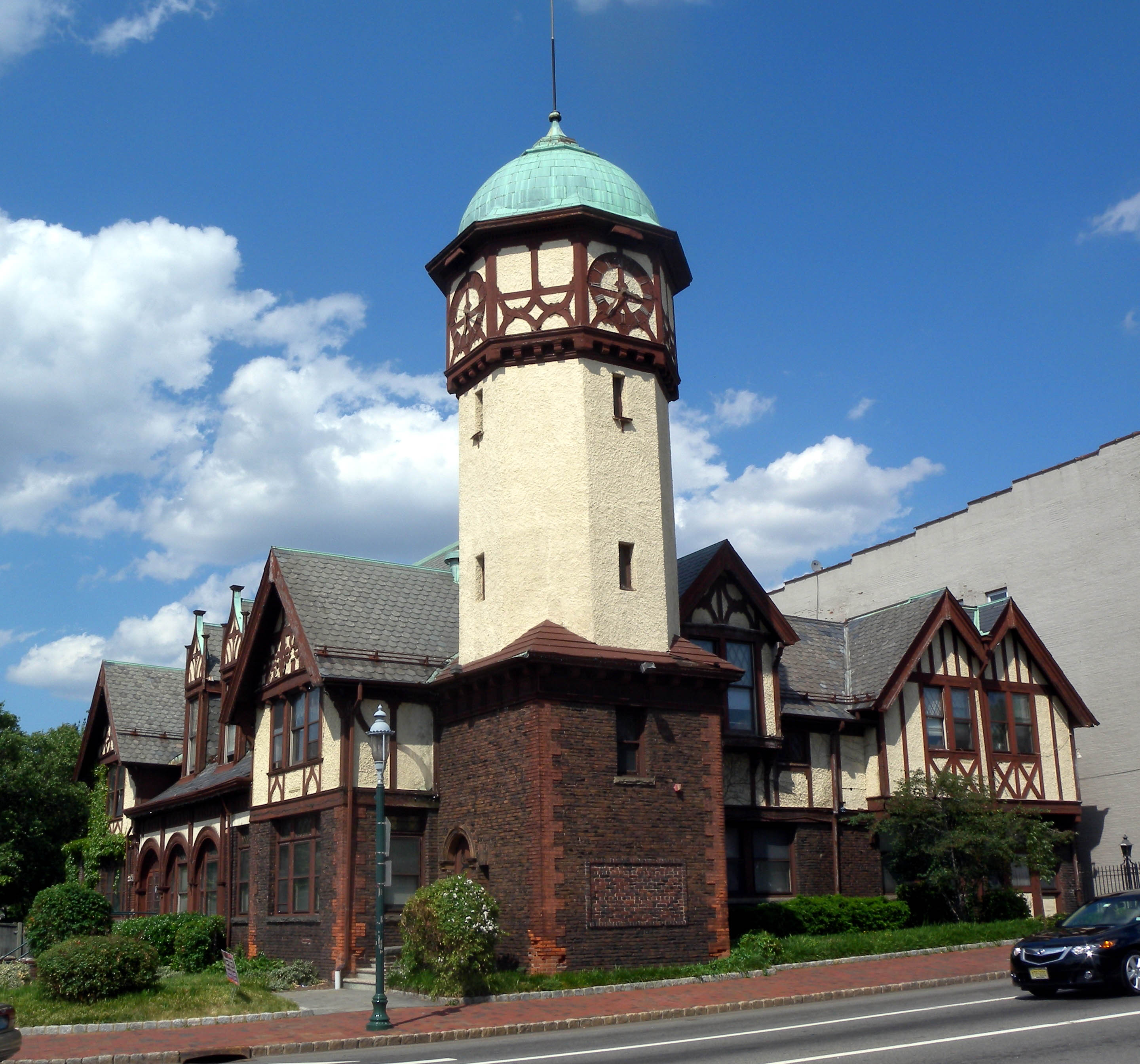
South Orange Village Hall, by Rossiter & Wright, 1894

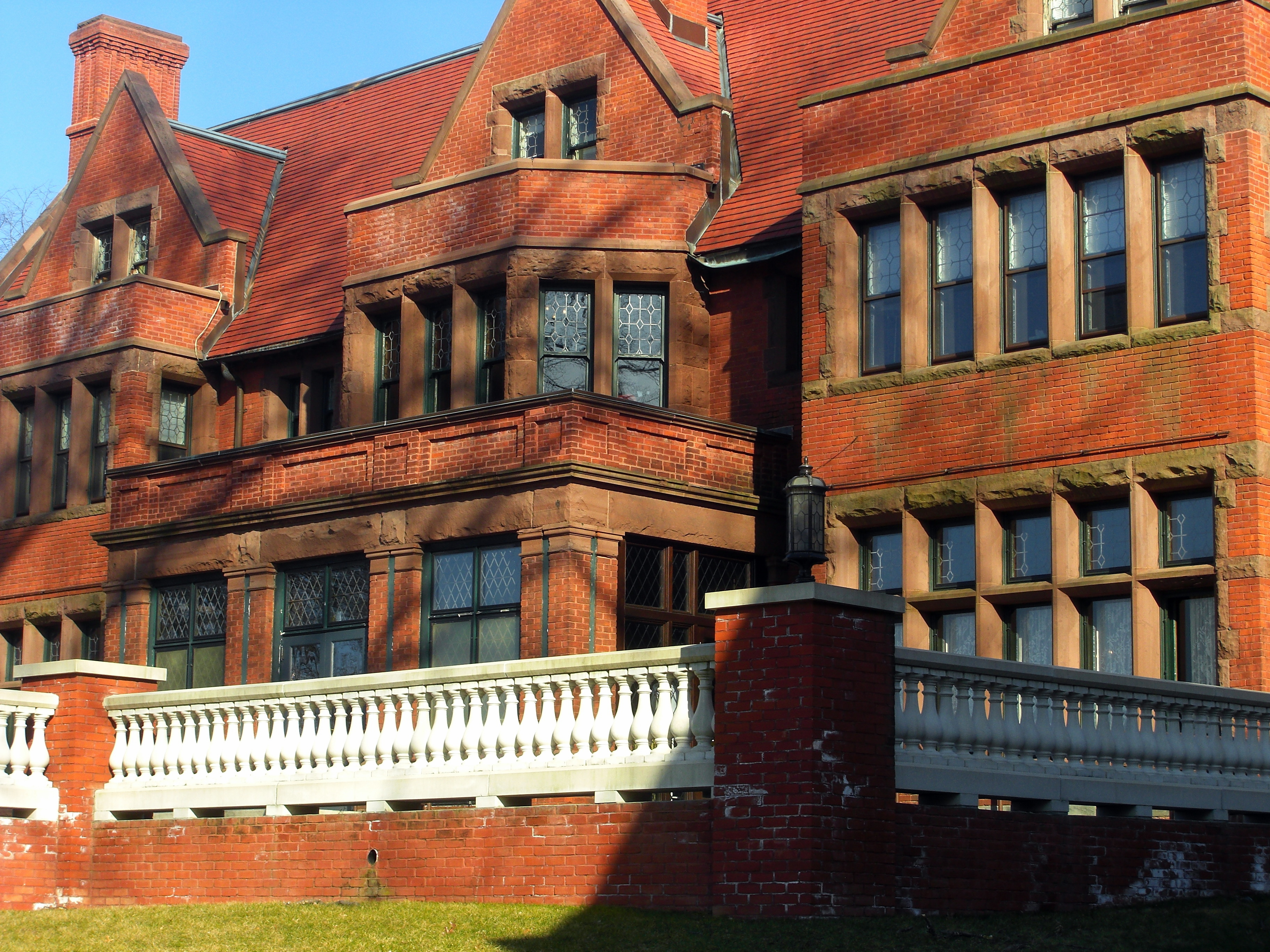
The Kip-Riker House (known as "Montrose"), today Temple Sharey Tefilo Israel, designed by Henry Ives Cobb for Ira A. Kip Jr., 1903.

== See also ==
- National Register of Historic Places listings in Essex County, New Jersey
