= Stone House by the Stone House Brook =

Historic house in New Jersey, United States

- U.S. National Register of Historic Places
- New Jersey Register of Historic Places
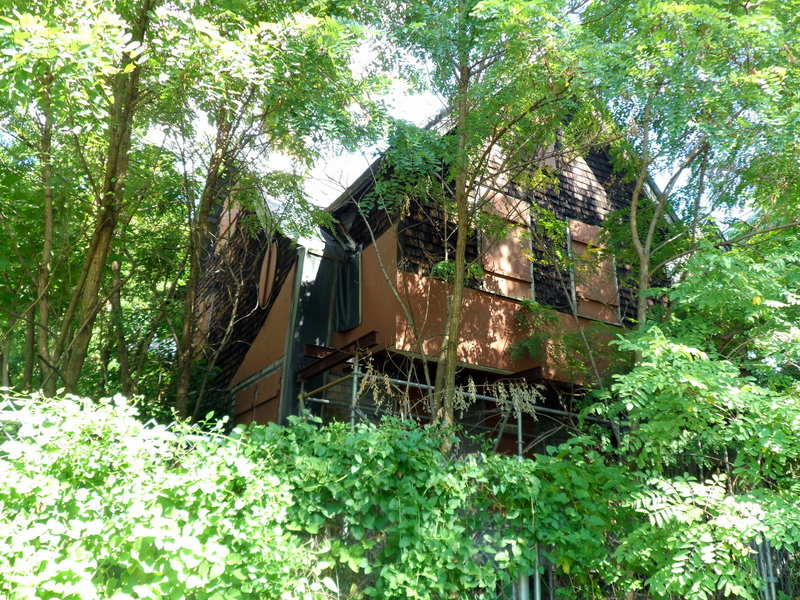
- The Old Stone House in 2014

- Location within Essex County, New Jersey Location within New Jersey Location within the United States
- Location: 219 South Orange Avenue, South Orange, New Jersey
- Coordinates: 40°44′42″N 74°15′13″W
- Area: 0.5 acres (0.20 ha)
- Built: pre-1680
- Architectural style: Queen Anne, Shingle Style
- NRHP reference No.: 87001333
- NJRHP No.: 1364

Significant dates
- Added to NRHP: November 22, 1991
- Designated NJRHP: October 4, 1991

Stone House by the Stone House Brook, also known as Old Stone House, is located at 219 South Orange Avenue in South Orange, Essex County, New Jersey, United States. It is one of the oldest extant structures in New Jersey, the original portion house built prior to 1680. The building was added to the National Register of Historic Places on November 22, 1991, for its significance in historic archaeology, education, community planning and development, and politics/government.

== History ==
The earliest reference to the Stone House by Stone House Brook dates to September 27, 1680, when it was mentioned in the minutes of a Newark town meeting to discuss and distribute land grants. It would have been built sometime after 1660 when the Dutch settled Bergen. A group of Pilgrims settled Newark in 1666 but the English or New England colonial houses of this period were generally built of wood. Dutch (or Flemish) colonial houses were usually built of brick, clay, or stone. The original house was one-and-a-half stories with a foundation of native rubble stone. Three of the original walls are still visible from the exterior of the greatly expanded house and a fourth wall is visible from the interior.

Nathaniel Wheeler is the first owner, circa 1680, for whom records exist. Dr. Bethuel Pierson, a Revolutionary War patriot and successful mill operator, owned the property 1773-1791 and enlarged it in a similar style using rubble stone. The house was purchased by William Augustus Brewer Jr. in 1866 and occupied by his family 1867–1916. Brewer became President of Washington Life Insurance Company in New York City and was influential in the development of the Village of South Orange as an early President of the board of trustees for two terms 1877–1880. Brewer greatly enlarged the house and turned it into a Queen Ann shingle-style mansion. Brewer named the house Aldworth. In 1915, the house was sold to Dr. George C. Albee. The house was sold to the Village of South Orange in 1953 and was used as offices for the school district until 1983.

In 1953 the Village of South Orange used the western portion of the property to form the parking lot for the relocated police station. In 1991, much of the remaining land was sold for $1 to the South Mountain B'nai B'rith Federation for development of HUD-approved senior housing. In 2008, stabilization work was done on the Old Stone House. In 2013, the Township of South Orange Village attempted to sell the landmark without success.

Preservation New Jersey included it on the list of New Jersey's Ten Most Endangered Historic Sites for 2020. The South Orange Historical and Preservation Society is fund raising to preserve the landmark for cultural and educational uses.

== See also ==
- National Register of Historic Places listings in Essex County, New Jersey
- List of the oldest buildings in New Jersey
