= Hepburn Library =

- U.S. National Register of Historic Places
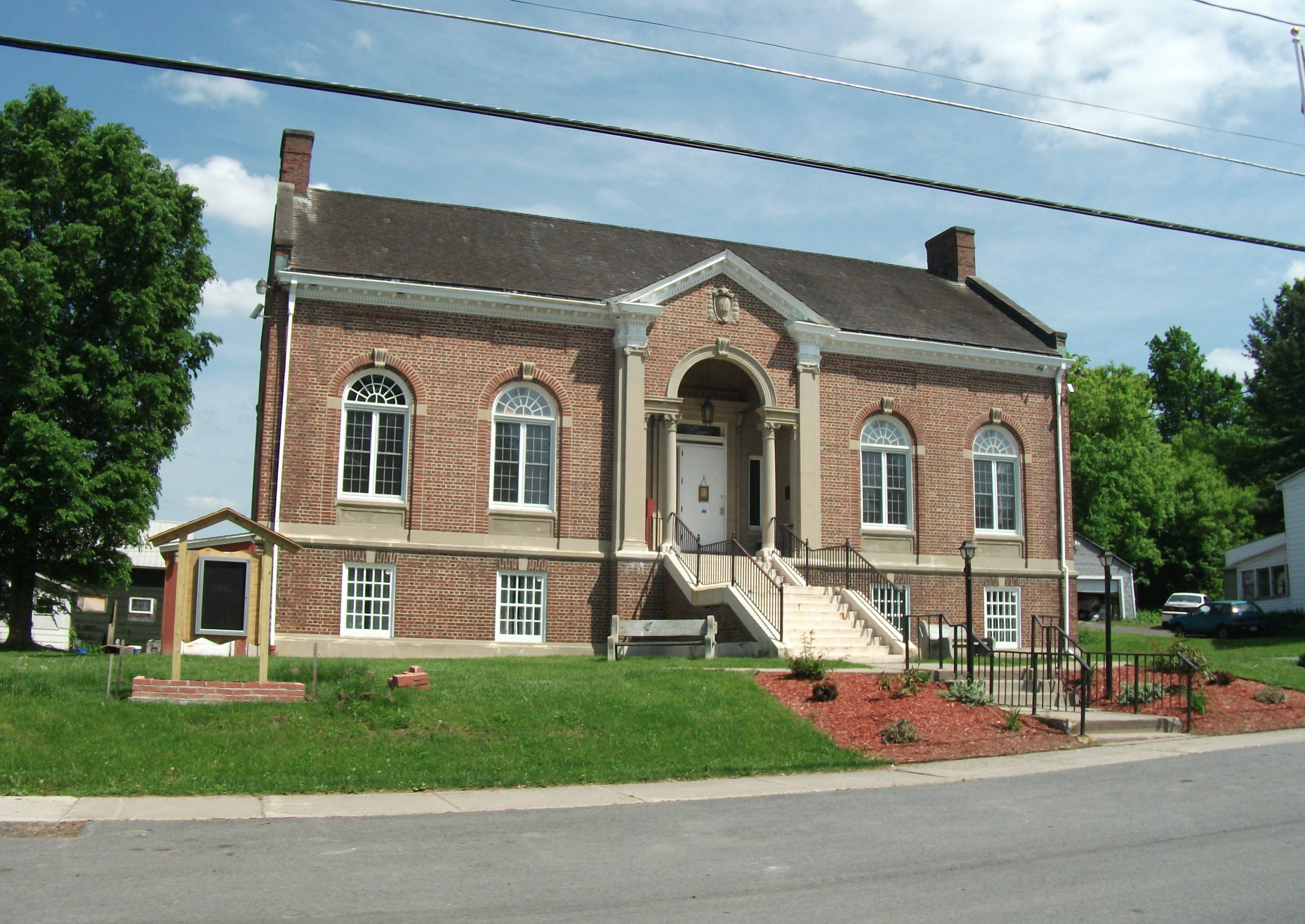
- Hepburn Library, May 2011

- Location within New York Location within the United States
- Location: 1 Hepburn St. Norfolk, New York, U.S.
- Coordinates: 44°48′9″N 74°59′29″W
- Area: less than one acre
- Built: 1919
- Architect: Rossiter & Muller
- Architectural style: Classical Revival, Colonial Revival
- NRHP reference No.: 04001056
- Added to NRHP: September 24, 2004

Hepburn Library is a historic library building located at Norfolk in St. Lawrence County, New York. It was designed by architects Rossiter & Muller and built in 1919–1920. It is a T-shaped, cross-gable-roofed Georgian Revival style brick building on a full, raised basement. Funding for its construction was provided by local philanthropist A. Barton Hepburn.

It was listed on the National Register of Historic Places in 2004.
