= Scott, New York =

- Town
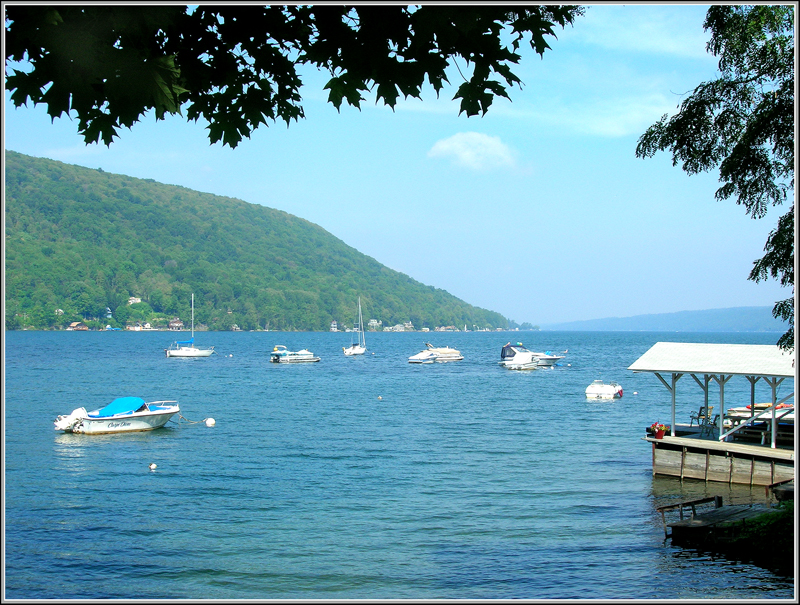
- Skaneateles Lake marina, hamlet of Fair Haven

- Location within Cortland County and New York

- Location in the United States Scott (New York)
- Coordinates: 42°43′46″N 76°13′54″W
- Country: United States
- State: New York
- County: Cortland

Government
  - Type: Town Council
  - Town Supervisor: Louis S. Martin (R)
  - Town Council: Members' List: • Necca Root (R); • Paula Arnold (R); • Louis Martin (R); • Trevor Adams (R)

Area
  - Total: 22.39 sq mi (57.99 km^{2})
  - Land: 22.24 sq mi (57.61 km^{2})
  - Water: 0.15 sq mi (0.38 km^{2})
- Elevation: 1,795 ft (547 m)

Population (2010)
  - Total: 1,176
  - Estimate (2016): 1,139
  - Density: 51.2/sq mi (19.77/km^{2})
- Time zone: UTC-5 (Eastern (EST))
  - Summer (DST): UTC-4 (EDT)
- ZIP Code: 13077 (Homer)
- Area code: 607
- FIPS code: 36-023-65915
- GNIS feature ID: 0979477
- Website: scott-ny.org

Scott is a town in Cortland County, New York, United States. The population was 1,176 at the 2010 census. The town was named after General Winfield Scott. It is in the northwestern corner of Cortland County and is northwest of the City of Cortland.

== History ==
Scott is within the former Central New York Military Tract. The first white settler arrived around 1799.

The town was formed in 1815 from the town of Preble. The population in 1865 was 1,149.

The town is the birthplace of James Henry Salisbury, who later went on to create the Salisbury Steak.

== Geography ==
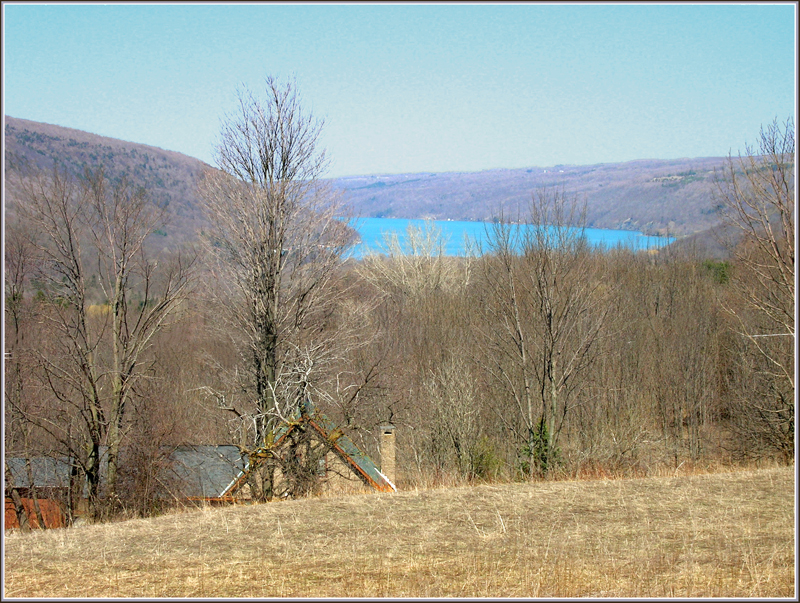
Skaneateles Lake from above Glen Haven

According to the United States Census Bureau, the town has a total area of 22.4 square miles (58.1 km^{2}), of which 22.3 square miles (57.7 km^{2}) is land and 0.15 square miles (0.4 km^{2}), or 0.65%, is water.

The western town line is the border of Cayuga County, and the northern town boundary is the border of Onondaga County. New York State Route 41 is a north-south highway in Scott.

The southern end of Skaneateles Lake, one of the Finger Lakes, is in the northwestern part of the town. Grout Brook, a noted trout-fishing stream, flows into the lake from the town. The hamlet of Fair Haven in the town of Scott, together with adjoining Glen Haven in the town of Niles and Spafford Landing in the town of Spafford, constitute a scenic destination for visitors as well as an attractive community for residents. Lodging and dining facilities are available, together with docking and a marina (below).

The eastern two-thirds of the town drains southward via Cold Brook and Factory Brook to the West Branch of the Tioughnioga River, part of the Susquehanna River watershed.

Hewitt State Forest, also known as Cortland Reforestation Area #1, is New York State’s first State Forest, comprising 937 acres, and is located in the Town of Scott, just off of State Route 41 on Hewitt Road.

== Demographics ==
Historical population
Census	Pop.	Note	%±
1820	775		—
1830	1,452		87.4%
1840	1,368		−5.8%
1850	1,293		−5.5%
1860	1,211		−6.3%
1870	1,083		−10.6%
1880	980		−9.5%
1890	987		0.7%
1900	852		−13.7%
1910	718		−15.7%
1920	625		−13.0%
1930	544		−13.0%
1940	535		−1.7%
1950	527		−1.5%
1960	600		13.9%
1970	805		34.2%
1980	1,193		48.2%
1990	1,167		−2.2%
2000	1,193		2.2%
2010	1,176		−1.4%
2016 (est.)	1,139		−3.1%
U.S. Decennial Census

As of the census of 2000, there were 1,193 people, 417 households, and 321 families residing in the town. The population density was 53.6 inhabitants per square mile (20.7/km^{2}). There were 478 housing units at an average density of 21.5 per square mile (8.3/km^{2}). The racial makeup of the town was 98.32% White, 0.08% African American, 0.42% Native American, 0.34% Asian, and 0.84% from two or more races. Hispanic or Latino of any race were 0.17% of the population.

There were 417 households, out of which 41.7% had children under the age of 18 living with them, 64.7% were married couples living together, 7.4% had a female householder with no husband present, and 22.8% were non-families. 15.6% of all households were made up of individuals, and 7.0% had someone living alone who was 65 years of age or older. The average household size was 2.86 and the average family size was 3.18.

In the town, the population was spread out, with 29.9% under the age of 18, 7.5% from 18 to 24, 31.3% from 25 to 44, 23.3% from 45 to 64, and 8.0% who were 65 years of age or older. The median age was 36 years. For every 100 females, there were 102.9 males. For every 100 females age 18 and over, there were 101.0 males.

The median income for a household in the town was $39,000, and the median income for a family was $43,438. Males had a median income of $32,313 versus $20,817 for females. The per capita income for the town was $15,588. About 7.7% of families and 9.9% of the population were below the poverty line, including 9.8% of those under age 18 and 4.0% of those age 65 or over.

== Communities and locations in Scott ==
- East Scott – A hamlet by the eastern town line on County Road 102.
- Fair Haven – A hamlet on the eastern shore of Skaneateles Lake by the northern town line. Distinct from Glen Haven on the western side of the lake in the town of Sempronius. The Glen Haven District No. 4 School and Public Library was listed on the National Register of Historic Places in 1997.
- Grout Mill – A hamlet approximately one mile west of Scott village and close to the western town line.
- Scott – The hamlet of Scott on Route 41 at the intersection of County Road 101. It was formerly called "Scott Center".
