= Glen Haven District No. 4 School and Public Library =

- U.S. National Register of Historic Places
- Location within New York Location within the United States
- Location: 7325 Fair Haven Rd., Fair Haven, New York
- Coordinates: 42°45′39″N 76°16′4″W
- Area: less than one acre
- Built: 1901
- Built by: Andrew Lieber
- Architect: Rossiter & Wright
- Architectural style: Shingle Style
- NRHP reference No.: 97000420
- Added to NRHP: May 23, 1997

Glen Haven District No. 4 School and Public Library is a historic school and library building located at Fair Haven in Cortland County, New York. It is a one-story irregularly shaped structure constructed in 1901 in the Shingle Style. It contains the classroom on the south end and the library on the north end. It features a hipped roof with boxed eave overhangs.

It was listed on the National Register of Historic Places in 1997.

It was designed by Rossiter & Wright and built by Andrew Lieber.
