= South Orange Fire House =

- South Orange Fire Department
- U.S. National Register of Historic Places
- New Jersey Register of Historic Places
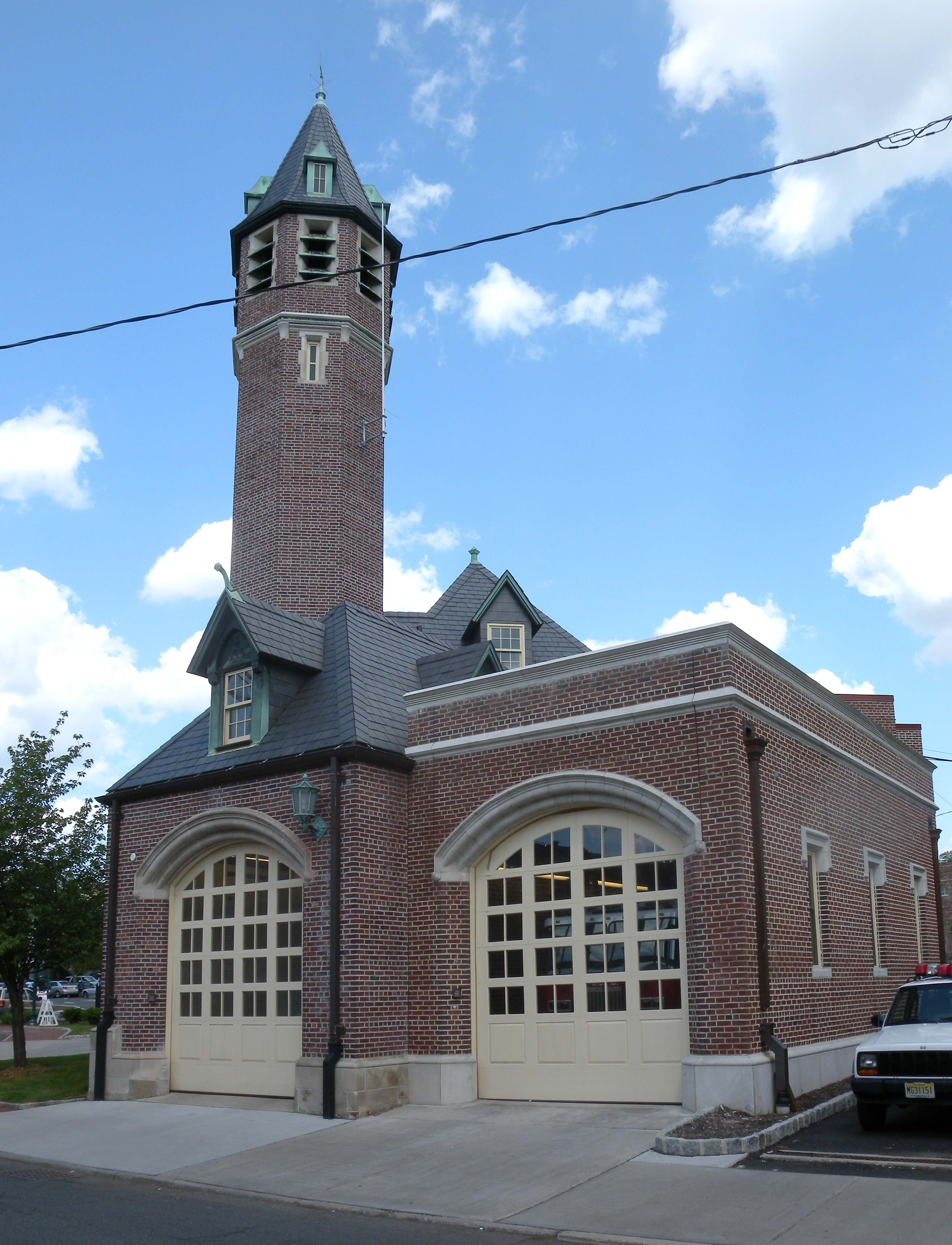
- South Orange Fire House as seen from Sloan Street along the Hoboken-bound railroad tracks of South Orange Station.

- Location within Essex County, New Jersey Location within New Jersey Location within the United States
- Location: Junction of First and Sloan Streets, South Orange, New Jersey
- Coordinates: 40°44′43″N 74°15′39″W
- Area: 0.4 acres (0.16 ha)
- Built: 1926
- Architects: Arthur Dillon and Henry L Beadel
- NRHP reference No.: 98000255
- NJRHP No.: 41

Significant dates
- Added to NRHP: June 22, 1998
- Designated NJRHP: January 28, 1998

The South Orange Fire Headquarters is located in South Orange, Essex County, New Jersey, United States. The building was built in 1926 under the direction of architects, Arthur Dillon and Henry L Beadel. The building was added to the National Register of Historic Places on June 22, 1998. The building serves as the headquarters for the South Essex Fire Department. On April 22, 2002, the Fire Headquarters was closed due to the presence of asbestos throughout the structure. The building was renovated and reopened several years later.

== See also ==
- National Register of Historic Places listings in Essex County, New Jersey
