= South Orange, New Jersey =

Village in Essex County, New Jersey, US

- Village
- South Orange Village
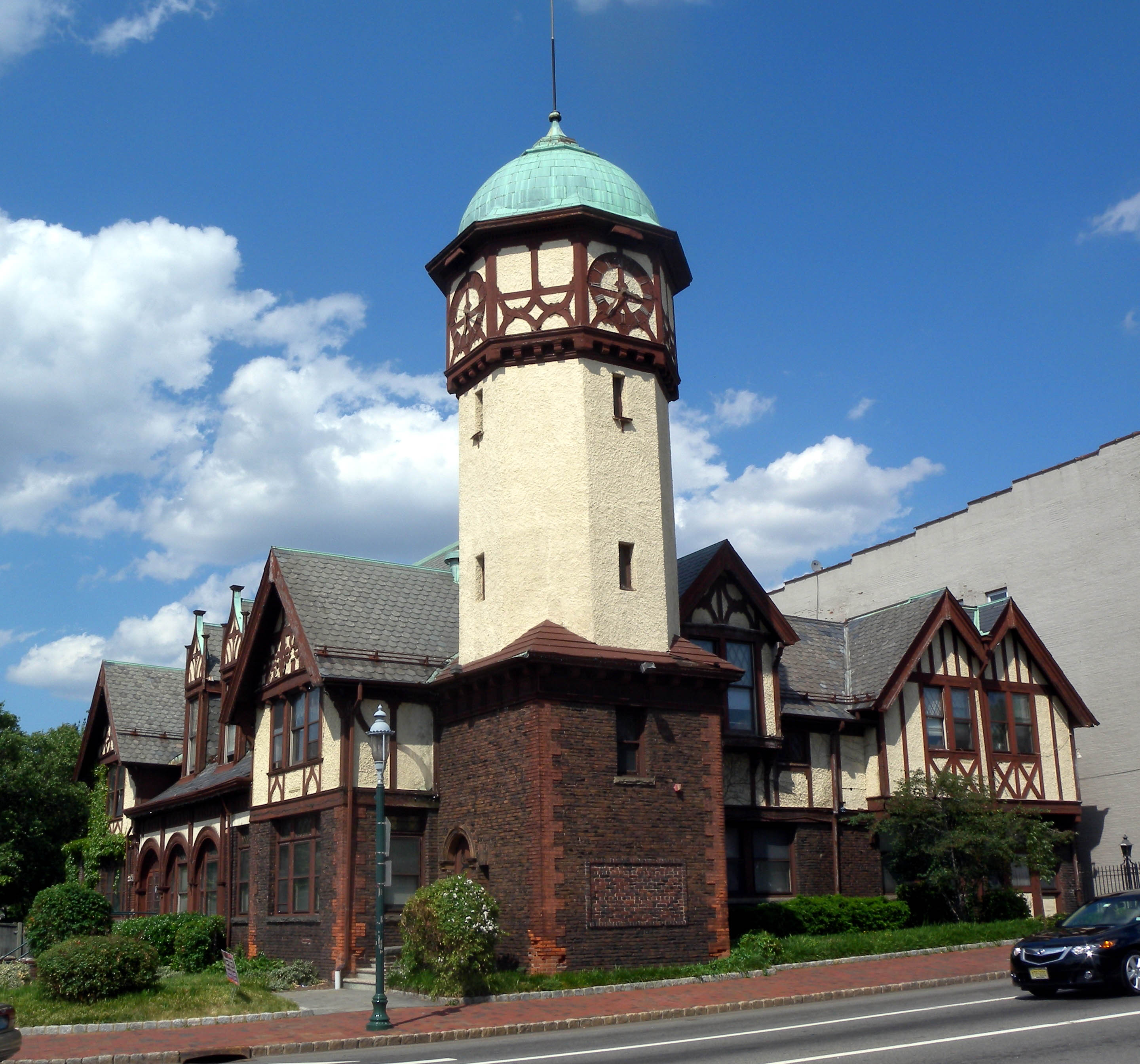
- South Orange village hall

- Seal
- Interactive map of South Orange, New Jersey
- Location in Essex County Location in New Jersey Location in the United States
- Coordinates: 40.748811°N 74.261512°W
- Country: United States
- State: New Jersey
- County: Essex
- Incorporated: May 4, 1869

Government
  - Type: Special charter
  - Body: Board of Trustees
  - Mayor: Sheena C. Collum (term ends May 17, 2027)
  - Administrator: Julie Doran
  - Village Clerk: Ojetti E. Davis

Area
  - Total: 2.85 sq mi (7.38 km^{2})
  - Land: 2.85 sq mi (7.37 km^{2})
  - Rank: 349th of 565 in state 17th of 22 in county
- Elevation: 138 ft (42 m)

Population (2020)
  - Total: 18,484
  - Estimate (2024): 18,736
  - Rank: 147th of 565 in state 13th of 22 in county
  - Density: 6,494.7/sq mi (2,507.6/km^{2})
  - Rank: 81st of 565 in state 11th of 22 in county
- Time zone: UTC−05:00 (Eastern (EST))
  - Summer (DST): UTC−04:00 (Eastern (EDT))
- ZIP Code: 07079
- Area codes: 973 and 862
- FIPS code: 3401369274
- GNIS feature ID: 1867376
- Website: www.southorange.org

South Orange is a historic suburban village located in Essex County, New Jersey. It was formally known as the Township of South Orange Village from October 1978 until April 25, 2024. As of the 2020 United States census, the village population was 18,484, an increase of 2,286 (+14.1%) from the 2010 census count of 16,198, which in turn reflected a decline of 766 (−4.5%) from the 16,964 counted in the 2000 census. Seton Hall University is located in the township.

"The time and circumstances under which the name South Orange originated will probably never be known," wrote historian William H. Shaw in 1884, "and we are obliged to fall back on a tradition, that Mr. Nathan Squier first used the name in an advertisement offering wood for sale" in 1795. Other sources attribute the derivation for all of the Oranges to King William III, Prince of Orange.

Of the 564 municipalities in New Jersey, South Orange Village is one of only four with a village type of government; the others are Loch Arbour, Ridgefield Park and Ridgewood.

On March 11, 2024, the governing body adopted a change to its charter under which "township" was dropped from the municipality's name, the name of the governing body and its leader became the council and mayor (rather than board of trustees and president of the board of trustees) and municipal elections were shifted from May to November (thus shifting term-end dates for all current elected officials from May to December 31); these changes took full effect 45 days later, on April 25, 2024.

== History ==
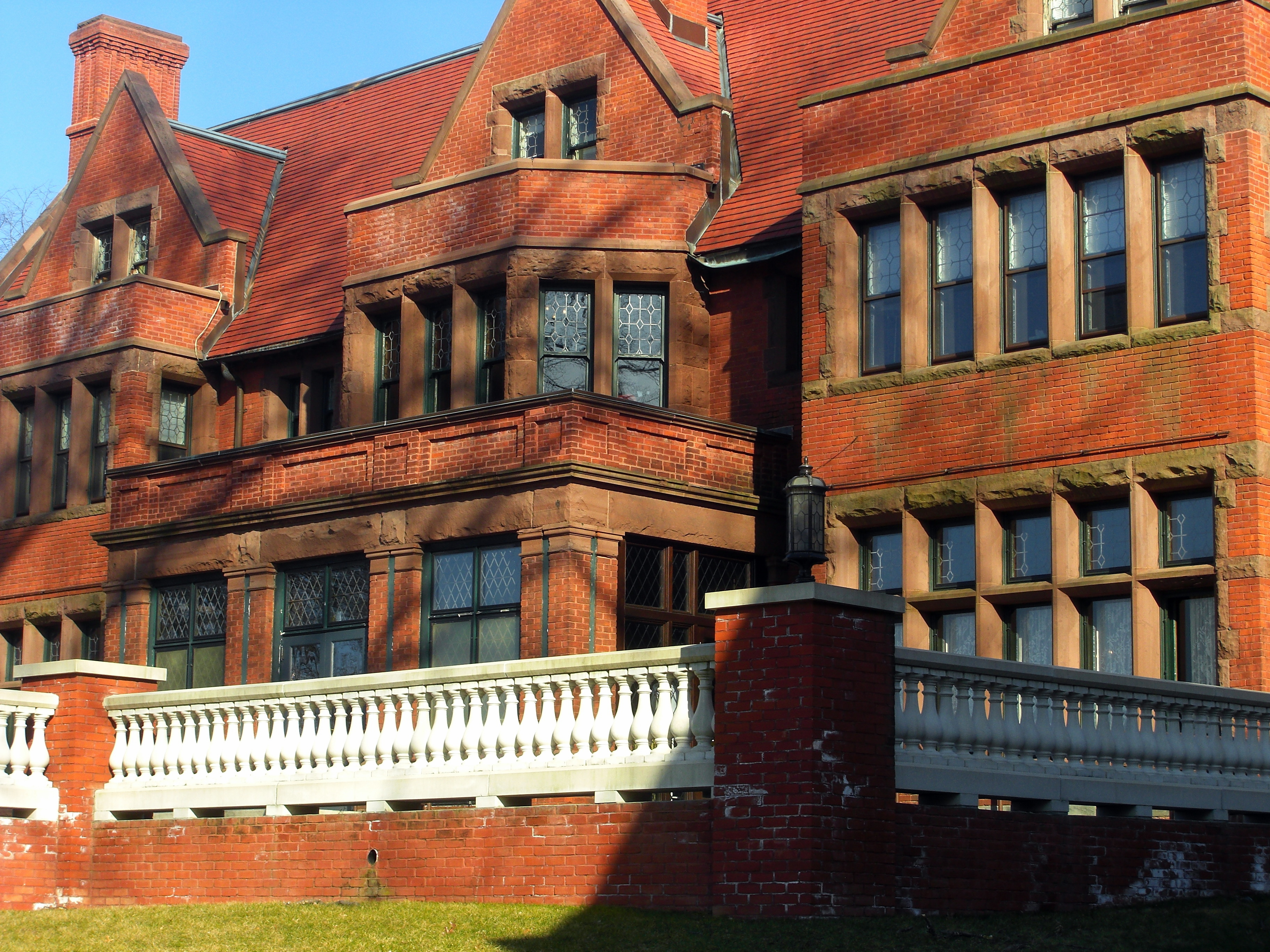
Temple Sharey Tefilo-Israel

South Orange Village dates back to May 4, 1869, when it was formed within South Orange Township (now Maplewood). On March 4, 1904, the Village of South Orange was created by an act of the New Jersey Legislature and separated from South Orange Township. In 1978, the village's name was changed by referendum to "The Township of South Orange Village", becoming the first of more than a dozen Essex County municipalities to reclassify themselves as townships in order to take advantage of federal revenue sharing policies that allocated townships a greater share of government aid to municipalities on a per capita basis.

What is now South Orange was part of a territory purchased from the Lenape Native Americans in 1666 by Robert Treat, who founded Newark that year on the banks of the Passaic River. The unsettled areas north and west of Newark were at first referred to as the uplands. South Orange was called the Chestnut Hills for a time.

There are two claimants to the first English settlement in present-day South Orange. In 1677 brothers Joseph and Thomas Brown began clearing land for a farm in the area northwest of the junction of two old trails that are now South Orange Avenue and Ridgewood Road. A survey made in 1686 states, "note this Land hath a House on it, built by Joseph Brown and Thomas Brown, either of them having an equal share of it" located at the present southwest corner of Tillou Road and Ridgewood Road. Minutes of a Newark town meeting of September 27, 1680, record that "Nathaniel Wheeler, Edward Riggs, and Joseph Riggs, have a Grant to take up Land upon the Chesnut Hill by Rahway River near the Stone House". The phrasing shows that a stone house already existed near (not on) the property. Joseph Riggs (seemingly the son of Edward Riggs) had a house just south of the Browns' house, at the northwest corner of South Orange Avenue and Ridgewood Road, according to a road survey of 1705. The same road survey locates Edward Riggs's residence near Millburn and Nathaniel Wheeler's residence in modern West Orange at the corner of Valley Road and Main Street.

Wheeler's property in South Orange extended east of the Rahway River including the site of an old house now known as the "Stone House", standing on the north side of South Orange Avenue just to the west of Grove Park. By 1756 or earlier this property was owned by Samuel Pierson. A survey of adjoining property in 1767 mentions "Pierson's house" forming accidentally the earliest documentation of a house on the property, which may be much older. Bethuel Pierson, son of Samuel, lived in this house and when he inherited it in 1773/74 he was said to live "at the mountain plantation by a certain brook called Stone House Brook." Sometime during his ownership (he died in 1791) "Bethuel Pierson had a stone addition added to his dwelling-house, which he caused to be dedicated by religious ceremonies". This would appear to be the stone-walled portion of the "Stone House". Stone House Brook runs west along the north side of the east–west road, past the "Stone House" and joining the Rahway River at about the location of the Brown and Riggs houses already noted. The oldest parts of the Pierson house are the oldest surviving structure in South Orange.

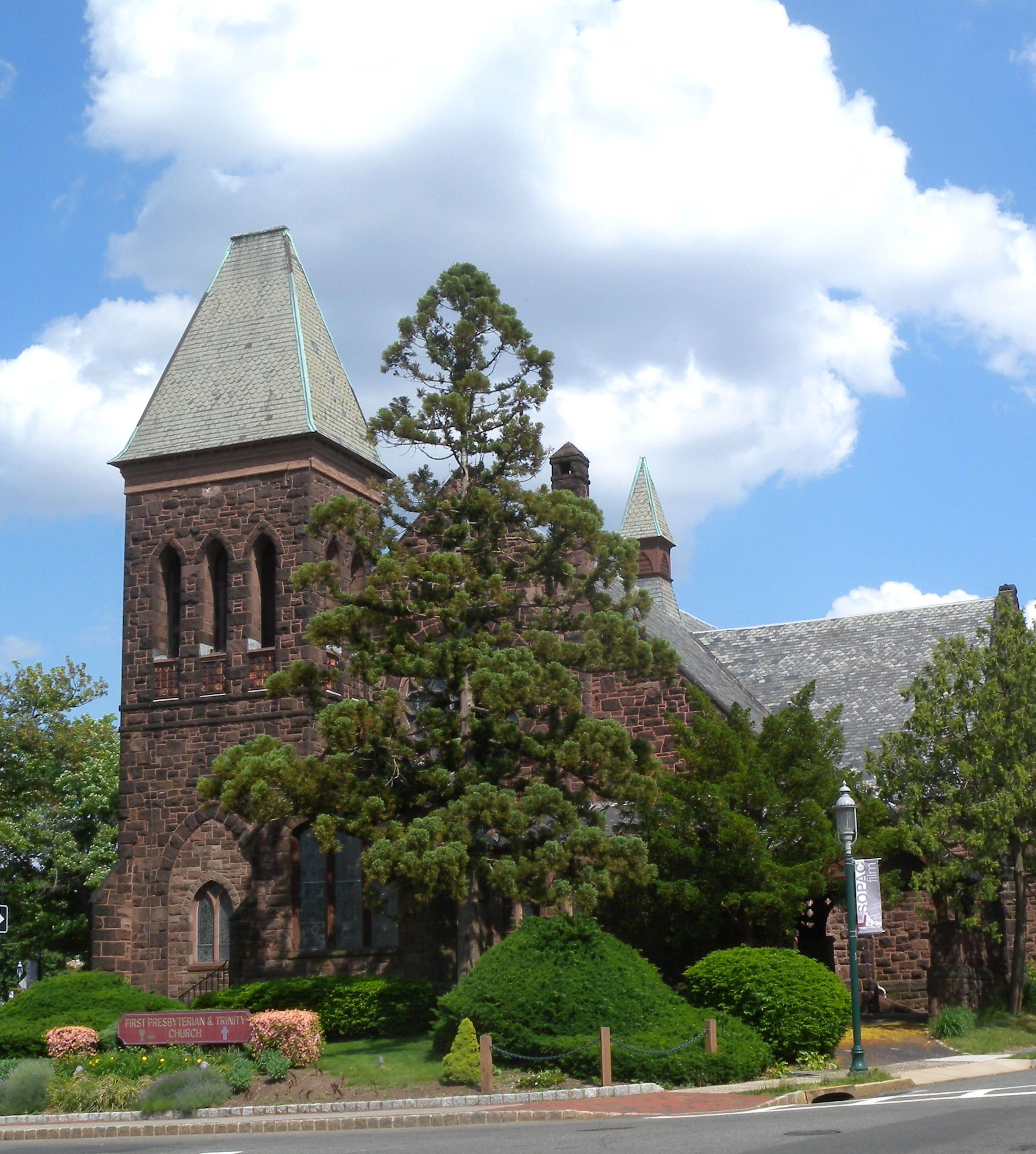
First Presbyterian Church

A deed of 1800 locates a property as being in "the Township of Newark, in the Parish of Orange, at a place called South Orange", marking the end of the name Chestnut Hills. Orange had been named after the ruler of England, William of Orange. Most of modern South Orange became part of Orange Township in 1806, part of Clinton Township in 1834, and part of South Orange Township in 1861. South Orange Village split off from South Orange Township in 1869 due to the desire for extensive privileges in the conduct of public affairs. South Orange Village became a haven for those who wanted freedom from the commotion of city life after the end of the American Civil War. A majority of South Orange Township became what is now known as Maplewood, New Jersey. Gordon's Gazetteer circa 1830 describes the settlement as having "about 30 dwellings, a tavern and store, a paper mill and Presbyterian church".

A country resort called the Orange Mountain House was established in 1847 on Ridgewood Road in present-day West Orange, where guests could enjoy the "water cure" from natural spring water and walk in the grounds that extended up the slope of South Mountain. The hotel burned down in 1890. The only remnants today are the names of Mountain Station and the Mountain House Road leading west from it to the site of the hotel.

South Orange could be reached by the Morris and Essex Railroad which opened in 1837 between Newark and Morristown. In 1869, the Morris and Essex Railroad became part of the main line of the Delaware, Lackawanna and Western Railroad which ran from Hoboken to Buffalo with through trains to Chicago.

The Montrose neighborhood was developed after the Civil War. Its large houses on generous lots attracted wealthy families from Newark and New York City during the decades from 1870 to 1900. The Orange Lawn Tennis Club was founded in 1880 at a location in Montrose, and in 1886 it was the location of the first US national tennis championships. The club moved to larger grounds on Ridgewood Road in 1916. Major tournament events were held at the club throughout the grass court era, and even into the mid-1980s professional events would occasionally be held there.

What is now the Baird Community Center was up until about 1920 the clubhouse for a golf course that encompassed what is now Meadowlands Park. Until regrading was performed during the 1970s, the outline of one of the course's sand traps was still visible near the base of Flood's Hill, a spot that has historically been one of the favorite sledding spots in Essex County.

The construction of Village Hall in 1894 and the "old" library building in 1896 indicate how the village was growing by that date. Horsecar service from Newark started in 1865, running via South Orange Avenue to the station. Electric trolley cars began running the line in 1893 and by about 1900 a branch of this line also ran down Valley Street into Maplewood. Another separate trolley line, eventually dubbed the "Swamp Line", ran from the west side of the station north through what is now park land and along Meadowbrook Lane into West Orange where it ended at Main Street. An old postcard photo shows a station shelter at Montrose Ave. The DL&W rebuilt the railroad through town in 1914–1916, raising the tracks above street level and opening new station buildings at South Orange and Mountain Station. In September 1930, a frail Thomas Edison (he would die about a year later) inaugurated electric train service on the M&E between Hoboken and South Orange, with further extensions of service to Morristown and Dover being initiated over the coming months.

The South Orange Library Association was organized by William Beebe, president of the Republican Club, where on November 14, 1864, a group of men and women met. Books were donated and the library was established in a corner room on the second floor of the Republican Club where it remained until 1867 when it was moved to a second floor room of the building next door on South Orange Avenue, near Sloan Street. It stayed there until 1884, when the building, with the library still on its second floor, was moved by horses up South Orange Avenue to the northwest corner of Scotland Road. Although supported as yet only by members' dues and a few gifts of money which were put into an endowment fund, in 1886 a new association was formed to establish a free circulating library and reading room which took over the loan books and other property of the old association. It was during this period, before Village Hall was built, that Village Trustees met in the Library's room. On May 1, 1889, the library was moved to a ground floor space at 59 South Orange Avenue.

At an annual meeting in 1895, Library Trustees considered the question of obtaining a library building and Eugene V. Connett's offer of a library site on the corner of Scotland Road and Taylor Place, once a $7,500 subscription was met (equivalent to $80,000 in 2025). On May 8, 1896, the library was moved into the building on that corner. A referendum held on April 27, 1926, showed that citizens had voted ten to one in favor of the town taking over full support of the library. It thereupon became "The South Orange Public Library." In February 1929, the Village Trustees passed an ordinance providing funds to construct a rear wing on the library and to provide a Children's Room in the basement, book stacks and a balcony on the floor above, together with rehabilitation work on the older part of the building. In November 1968, the new library building on the corner of Scotland Road and Comstock Place was dedicated.

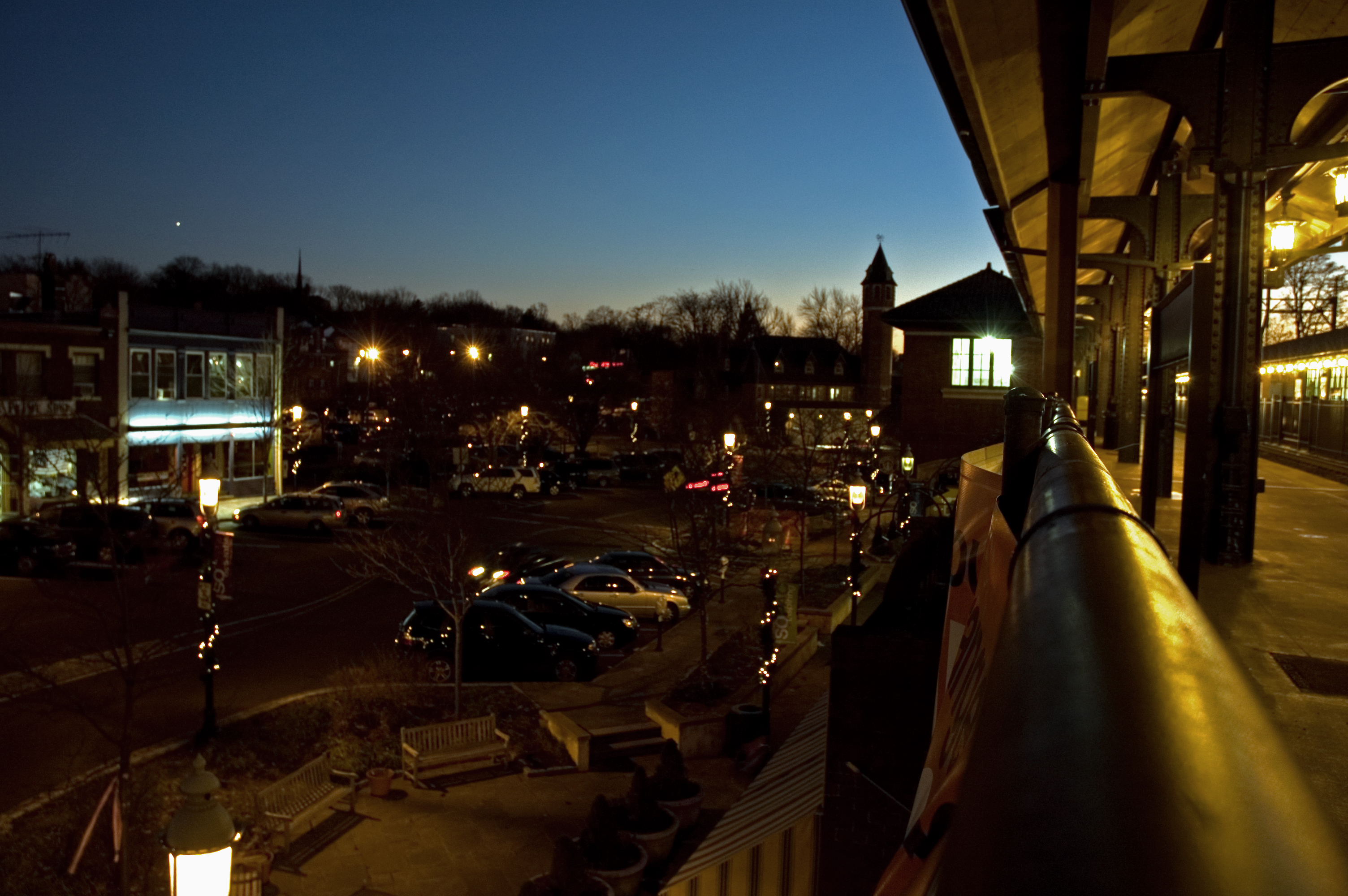
Part of the village as viewed from the South Orange station platform

Good transportation and a booming economy caused South Orange and neighboring communities to begin a major transformation in the 1920s into bedroom communities for Newark and New York City. Large houses were built in the blocks around the Orange Lawn Tennis club, while in other areas, especially south of South Orange Avenue, more modest foursquare houses were constructed. The only large area not developed by 1930 was the high ground west of Wyoming Avenue.

There were two rock quarries within the village supplying trap rock for construction. Kernan's operated as late as the 1980s at the top of Tillou Road. The village's other larger businesses were lumber and coal yards clustered around the railroad station that supplied them. The business district is still located in the blocks just east of the station.

The old Morris and Essex Railroad is operated today by NJ Transit. Midtown Direct, initiated in 1996, offers service directly into Penn Station in Midtown Manhattan, and has since caused a surge in real estate prices as the commute time to midtown dropped from about 50 minutes to 35, as the service eliminated the need for passengers to transfer to PATH trains at Hoboken. As a result, demand for commuter parking permits in lots adjoining the train and bus stations is extremely high, with a waiting list as long as five years for commuter parking spots.

=== Historic designations ===
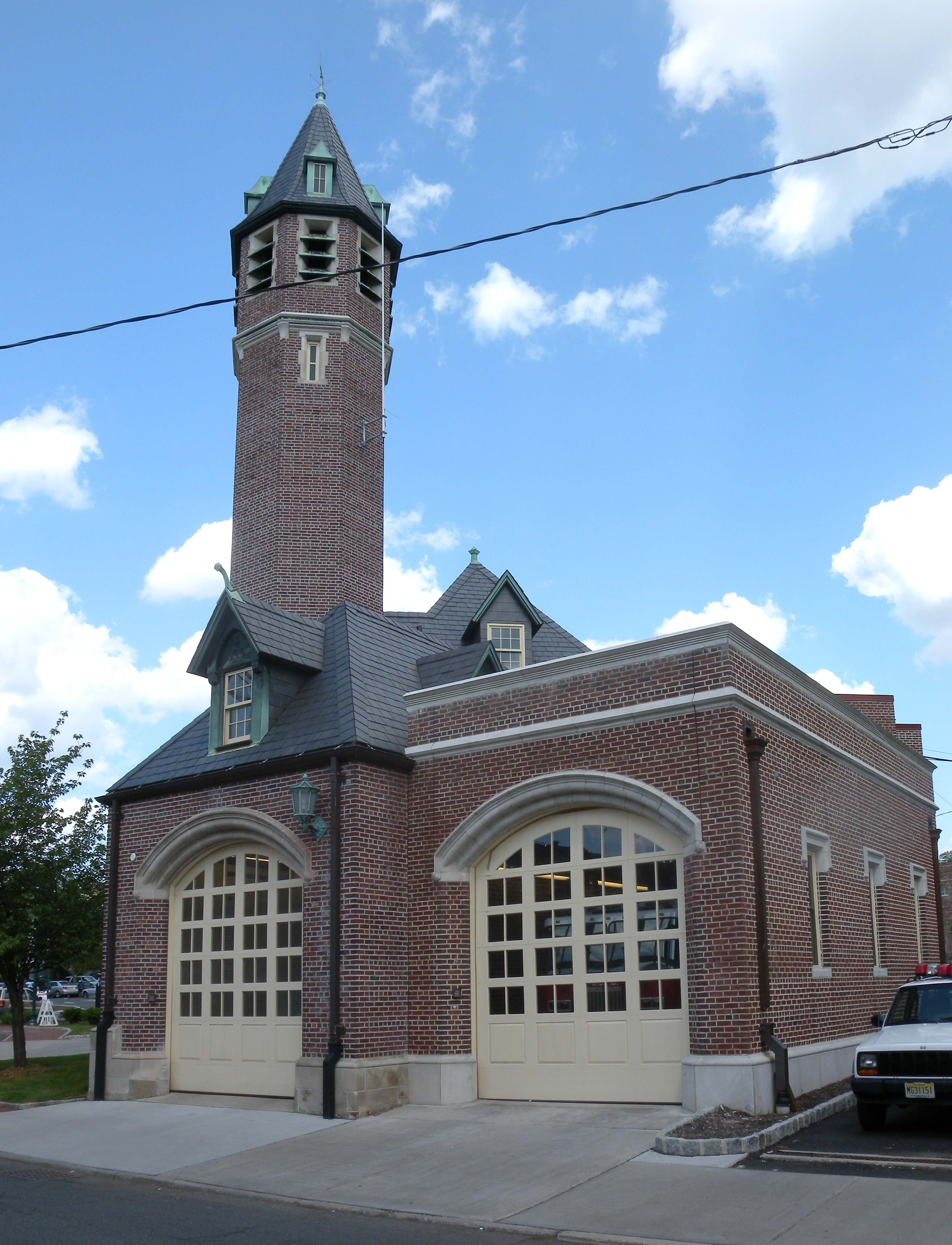
Fire station

South Orange has a number of places listed on the State and National Historic Registers.

- Old Stone House by the Stone House Brook (ID#1364), 219 South Orange Avenue – First mentioned in a document in 1680, the house has been owned by the village which has sought to sell it to ensure that it will be restored.
- Baird Community Center (ID#3146), 5 Mead Street – The Baird offers arts programs, including the Pierro Gallery of South Orange and The Theater on 3, along with preschool and other educational programming.
- Chapel of the Immaculate Conception (ID#4121), 400 South Orange Avenue, dates back to Seton Hall's move to South Orange and serves as the center focus of its campus.
- Eugene V. Kelly Carriage House (Father Vincent Monella Art Center) (ID#1360), Seton Hall University, South Orange Avenue
- Montrose Park Historic District (ID#3147), roughly bounded by South Orange Avenue, Holland Road, the City of Orange boundary and the NJ Transit railroad right-of-way
- Mountain Station Railroad Station (ID#1361), 449 Vose Avenue
- Old Main Delaware, Lackawanna and Western Railroad Historic District (ID#3525), Morris and Essex Railroad Right-of-Way (NJ Transit Morristown Line), from Hudson, Hoboken City to Warren, Washington Township, and then along Warren Railroad to the Delaware River.
- Prospect Street Historic District (ID#4), bounded by South Orange Avenue on the north, Tichenor Avenue on the east, Roland Avenue on the south and railroad track on the west
- South Orange Fire Department (ID#41), First Avenue and Sloan Avenue
- South Orange station (ID#1362), at 19 Sloan Street, was constructed in 1916 and added to the National Register of Historic Places in 1984.
- South Orange Village Hall (ID#1363), constructed in 1894 at the corner of South Orange Avenue and Scotland Road
- Temple Sharey Tefilo-Israel (ID#78), 432 Scotland Road, dates back to the formation of Temple Sharey Tefilo in Orange in 1874 and of Temple Israel in South Orange in 1948, which acquired the Kip-Riker mansion, the congregation's current home, the following year.

=== Local character ===
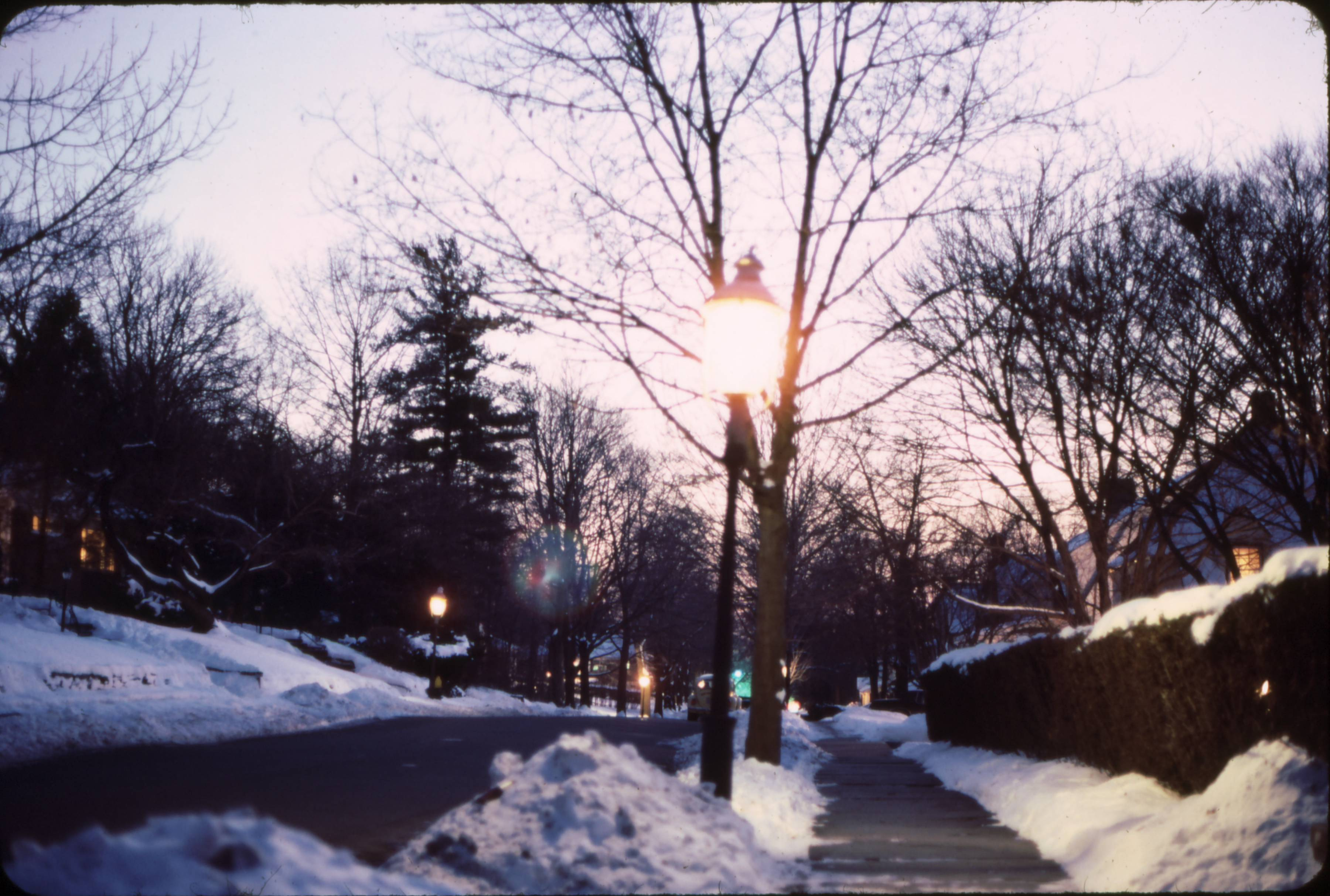
Gaslights on Vose Avenue near dusk

The village is one of only a few in New Jersey to retain gas light street illumination (others include Riverton, Palmyra, Trenton Mill Hill neighborhood, and Glen Ridge). The gaslight, together with the distinctive Village Hall, has long been the symbol of South Orange. Many of the major roads in town do have modern mercury vapor streetlights (built into gaslight frames), but most of the residential sections of the town are still gas-lit. A proposal to replace all the gaslights in town with electric streetlights was explored as both a cost-saving and security measure during the 1970s, and although the changeover to electric was rejected at the time, the light output of the lamps was increased to provide more adequate lighting. There have been claims that South Orange has more operating gaslights than any other community in the United States. In 2010, the village initiated a project that would automatically shut the lamps in the morning and light them at dusk, as part of an effort to save as much as $400,000 each year in energy costs for the 1,438 gas lamps across the village. As of 2019, these devices have not been installed.

Architecture is extremely varied. Most of the town is single-family wood-framed houses; however, there are a few apartment buildings from various eras as well as townhouse-style condominiums of mostly more recent vintage. Houses cover a range that includes every common style of the Mid-Atlantic United States since the late nineteenth century, in sizes that range from brick English Cottages to giant Mansard-roofed mansions. Tudor, Victorian, Colonial, Ranch, Modern, and many others are all to be found. Most municipal government structures date from the 1920s, with a few being of more modern construction.

Many residents commute to New York City, but others work locally or in other parts of New Jersey. South Orange has a central business district with restaurants, banks, and other retail and professional services. There are a few small office buildings, but no large-scale enterprise other than Seton Hall University.

== Geography ==
According to the United States Census Bureau, the village had a total area of 2.85 square miles (7.4 km^{2}), including 2.85 square miles (7.4 km^{2}) of land and <0.01 square miles (0.026 km^{2}) of water (0.07%).

South Orange is bordered by the Essex County municipalities of Maplewood, Newark, West Orange, Orange, and East Orange.

The East Branch of the Rahway River, which originates in West Orange, flows through the entire length of the village. Most of the time it is a trickle but flows can be heavy after rain. In the past it would occasionally overflow its banks and flood low-lying parts of town an issue that was addressed by United States Army Corps of Engineers flood control projects that remediated the problem in the mid-1970s.

The western part of the town sits on the eastern slope of South Mountain (elevation <660 feet (200 m)), leveling into a small valley near the central business district. At the top of the slope, the western edge of the town runs along the eastern border of South Mountain Reservation. South Orange contains the historic Montrose district, Newstead, Tuxedo Park, and Wyoming sections. Seton Hall University is located in the southeast quadrant of the township.

=== Climate ===
South Orange has a humid continental climate (Dfa).

Climate data for South Orange
Month	Jan	Feb	Mar	Apr	May	Jun	Jul	Aug	Sep	Oct	Nov	Dec	Year
Mean daily maximum °F (°C)	35.6 (2.0)	39.2 (4.0)	46.8 (8.2)	57.9 (14.4)	68.5 (20.3)	77.2 (25.1)	83.8 (28.8)	81.9 (27.7)	75 (24)	63 (17)	50.9 (10.5)	41.9 (5.5)	60.1 (15.6)
Mean daily minimum °F (°C)	24.3 (−4.3)	25.9 (−3.4)	33.3 (0.7)	43.3 (6.3)	53.1 (11.7)	61.5 (16.4)	67.8 (19.9)	67.3 (19.6)	60.1 (15.6)	50.4 (10.2)	38.8 (3.8)	31.1 (−0.5)	46.4 (8.0)

== Demographics ==
Historical population
Census	Pop.	Note	%±
1880	2,178		—
1890	3,106		42.6%
1900	4,608		48.4%
1910	6,014		30.5%
1920	7,274		21.0%
1930	13,630		87.4%
1940	13,742		0.8%
1950	15,230		10.8%
1960	16,175		6.2%
1970	16,971		4.9%
1980	15,864		−6.5%
1990	16,390		3.3%
2000	16,964		3.5%
2010	16,198		−4.5%
2020	18,484		14.1%
2024 (est.)	18,736		1.4%
Population sources: 1880–1890 1880–1920; 1890–1910 1880–1930; 1940–2000 2000; 2010 2020

South Orange is a village and has one of the largest Jewish communities in Essex County, along with nearby Livingston and Millburn.

=== 2020 census ===
South Orange Village township, Essex County, New Jersey – Racial and ethnic composition Note: the US Census treats Hispanic/Latino as an ethnic category. This table excludes Latinos from the racial categories and assigns them to a separate category. Hispanics/Latinos may be of any race.
Race / Ethnicity (NH = Non-Hispanic)	Pop 2000	Pop 2010	Pop 2020	% 2000	% 2010	% 2020
White alone (NH)	9,871	9,231	10,510	58.19%	56.99%	56.86%
Black or African American alone (NH)	5,150	4,484	3,803	30.36%	27.68%	20.57%
Native American or Alaska Native alone (NH)	16	18	11	0.09%	0.11%	0.06%
Asian alone (NH)	659	829	1,228	3.88%	5.12%	6.64%
Pacific Islander alone (NH)	5	1	2	0.03%	0.01%	0.01%
Some Other Race alone (NH)	51	91	282	0.30%	0.56%	1.53%
Mixed Race or Multi-Racial (NH)	375	551	1,044	2.21%	3.40%	5.65%
Hispanic or Latino (any race)	837	993	1,604	4.93%	6.13%	8.68%
Total	16,964	16,198	18,484	100.00%	100.00%	100.00%

=== 2010 census ===
The 2010 United States census counted 16,198 people, 5,516 households, and 3,756 families in the township. The population density was 5,672.8 people per square mile (2,190.3 people/km^{2}). There were 5,815 housing units at an average density of 2,036.5 units per square mile (786.3 units/km^{2}). The racial makeup was 60.19% (9,750) White, 28.66% (4,642) Black or African American, 0.14% (23) Native American, 5.16% (836) Asian, 0.01% (1) Pacific Islander, 1.77% (287) from other races, and 4.07% (659) from two or more races. Hispanic or Latino of any race were 6.13% (993) of the population.

Of the 5,516 households, 35.2% had children under the age of 18; 54.1% were married couples living together; 10.3% had a female householder with no husband present and 31.9% were non-families. Of all households, 24.3% were made up of individuals and 8.2% had someone living alone who was 65 years of age or older. The average household size was 2.70 and the average family size was 3.24.

22.9% of the population were under the age of 18, 15.2% from 18 to 24, 24.2% from 25 to 44, 27.2% from 45 to 64, and 10.5% who were 65 years of age or older. The median age was 37.2 years. For every 100 females, the population had 93.7 males. For every 100 females ages 18 and older there were 90.4 males.

The Census Bureau's 2006–2010 American Community Survey showed that (in 2010 inflation-adjusted dollars) median household income was $123,373 (with a margin of error of +/− $7,803) and the median family income was $147,532 (+/− $9,218). Males had a median income of $86,122 (+/− $7,340) versus $71,625 (+/− $9,896) for females. The per capita income for the township was $49,607 (+/− $4,022). About 2.5% of families and 7.8% of the population were below the poverty line, including 3.4% of those under age 18 and 4.5% of those age 65 or over.

=== 2000 census ===
As of the 2000 United States census there were 16,964 people, 5,522 households, and 3,766 families residing in the township. The population density was 5,945.3 inhabitants per square mile (2,295.5/km^{2}). There were 5,671 housing units at an average density of 1,987.5 units per square mile (767.4 units/km^{2}). The racial makeup of the township was 60.41% White, 31.30% African American, 0.09% Native American, 3.89% Asian, 0.03% Pacific Islander, 1.57% from other races, and 2.71% from two or more races. Hispanic or Latino of any race were 4.93% of the population.

There were 5,522 households, out of which 33.8% had children under the age of 18 living with them, 55.2% were married couples living together, 10.0% had a female householder with no husband present, and 31.8% were non-families. 25.2% of all households were made up of individuals, and 9.8% had someone living alone who was 65 years of age or older. The average household size was 2.69 and the average family size was 3.26.

In the township the population was spread out, with 22.3% under the age of 18, 17.5% from 18 to 24, 26.1% from 25 to 44, 22.2% from 45 to 64, and 11.9% who were 65 years of age or older. The median age was 35 years. For every 100 females, there were 92.3 males. For every 100 females age 18 and over, there were 88.1 males.

The median income for a household in the township was $83,611, and the median income for a family was $107,641. Males had a median income of $61,809 versus $42,238 for females. The per capita income for the township was $41,035. About 1.9% of families and 5.3% of the population were below the poverty line, including 2.6% of those under age 18 and 5.4% of those age 65 or over.

== Parks and recreation ==
The village has a municipal swimming pool open to all residents. In most area communities, municipal pool memberships are restricted or costly, but the pool in South Orange was built on land willed by a wealthy resident to the town for common use and under the terms of the deal the pool had to remain inexpensive for the residents. Residents may purchase an annual pass for a fee of $35, which provides access to the South Orange Community Pool and full access to all other community facilities and programs; non-residents may use the pool for a small fee on a per visit basis on a guest pass that must be purchased by a resident. The original pool, built in the 1920s, is among the first free community pools to be built in the United States, and was replaced by an Olympic-size pool in 1972.

The South Orange River Greenway is currently under construction. The River Greenway will be a promenade for bicyclists and pedestrians that will connect part of West Third Street in South Orange with West Parker Avenue in Maplewood. Several abandoned buildings will be removed near the South Orange Department of Public Works facility to make way for the River Greenway.

Parks in the village include Grove Park, New Waterlands Park, Flood's Hill, Cameron Field and Farrell Field.

== Arts and culture ==
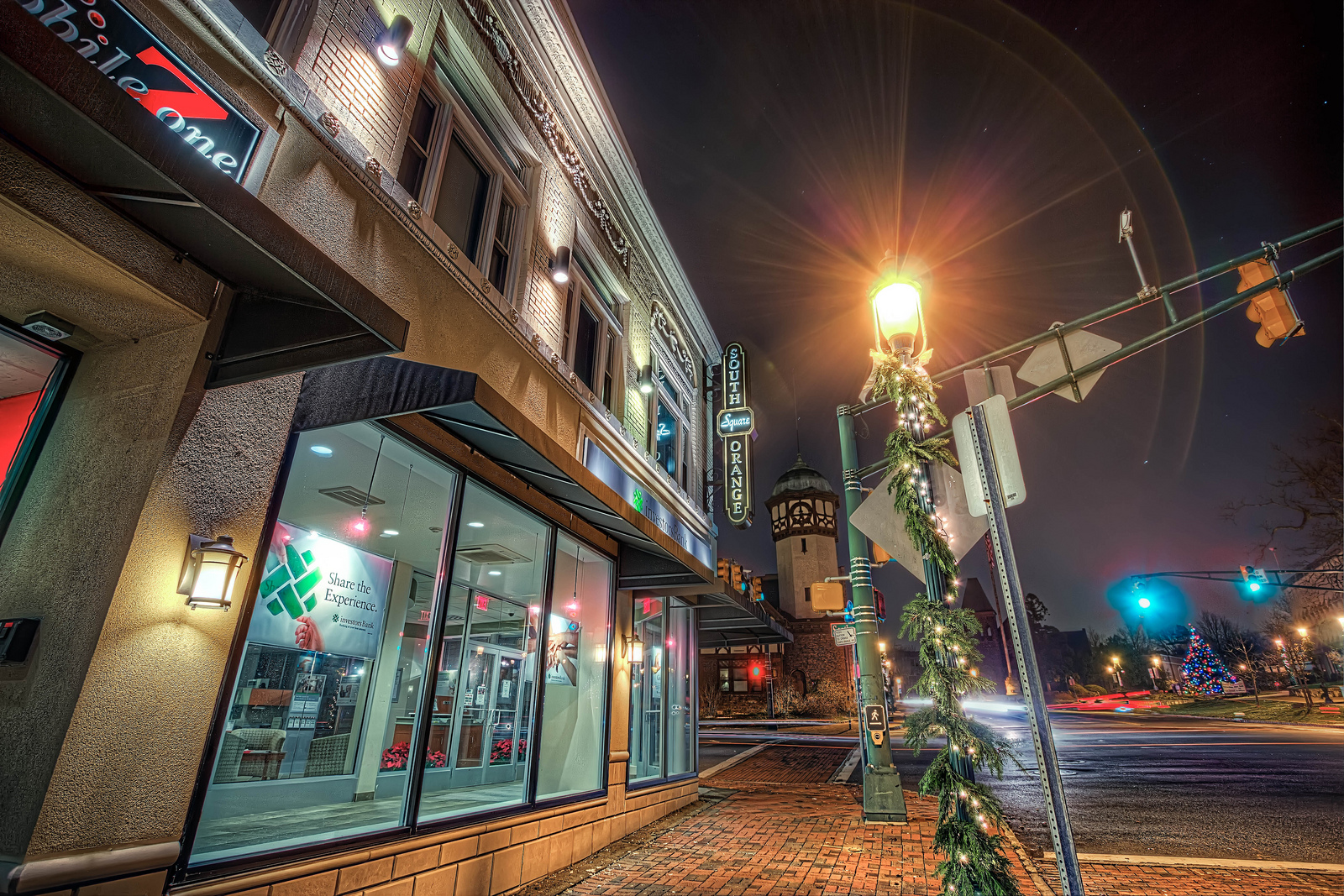
South Orange Village at night

The Baird Center, located in Meadowland Park, houses the South Orange Department of Recreation and Cultural Affairs, and hosts many activities. Most of the department's programs are housed in The Baird or in adjoining Meadowland Park. The center offers arts programs, including the Pierro Gallery of South Orange, The Theater on 3, and other arts spaces, along with preschool and other educational, arts and recreational programming. The Baird Center is undergoing extensive renovation starting in late 2019. The Baird hosts events together with SOPAC, including the long-running Giants of Jazz concert series.

The Pierro Gallery of South Orange, located within The Baird and operating as part of the South Orange Department of Recreation and Cultural Affairs, encourages community involvement in the visual arts and exhibits the non-commercial works of contemporary artists working in the field, in addition to providing arts education and serving local artists. Exhibitions often include the work of area artists, with a juried "Essex Exposed" exhibition conducted twice each year offering materials created by artists from Essex County.

South Orange Performing Arts Center (SOPAC) is located next to the South Orange station. The performance venue is a 415-seat proscenium theater, with a five-screen cinema, The Village at SOPAC, as well as a dance studio/rental space in the same complex.

SOPAC presents music, family, dance, theater, and comedy programs throughout the year. In partnership with Seton Hall University, SOPAC has presented Seton Hall Arts Council events, including a Classical Concert Series, Jazz 'n the Hall, and Seton Hall Theatre—student theater productions.

The plans for SOPAC were first conceived in the mid-1990s as part of an effort by the village to develop the downtown area. Seton Hall University partnered with SOPAC and construction in August 2004. The complex opened in November 2006 to the general public.

Founded in 1949, the South Orange Symphony is a full-sized symphony orchestra made up of volunteer amateur and semi-professional musicians with a wide range of musical backgrounds led by a professional conductor. The ensemble plays repertoire that covers the full range of classical literature from the 18th century to today, and presents three free concerts each year in Sterling Hall at the South Orange Middle School.

== Government ==
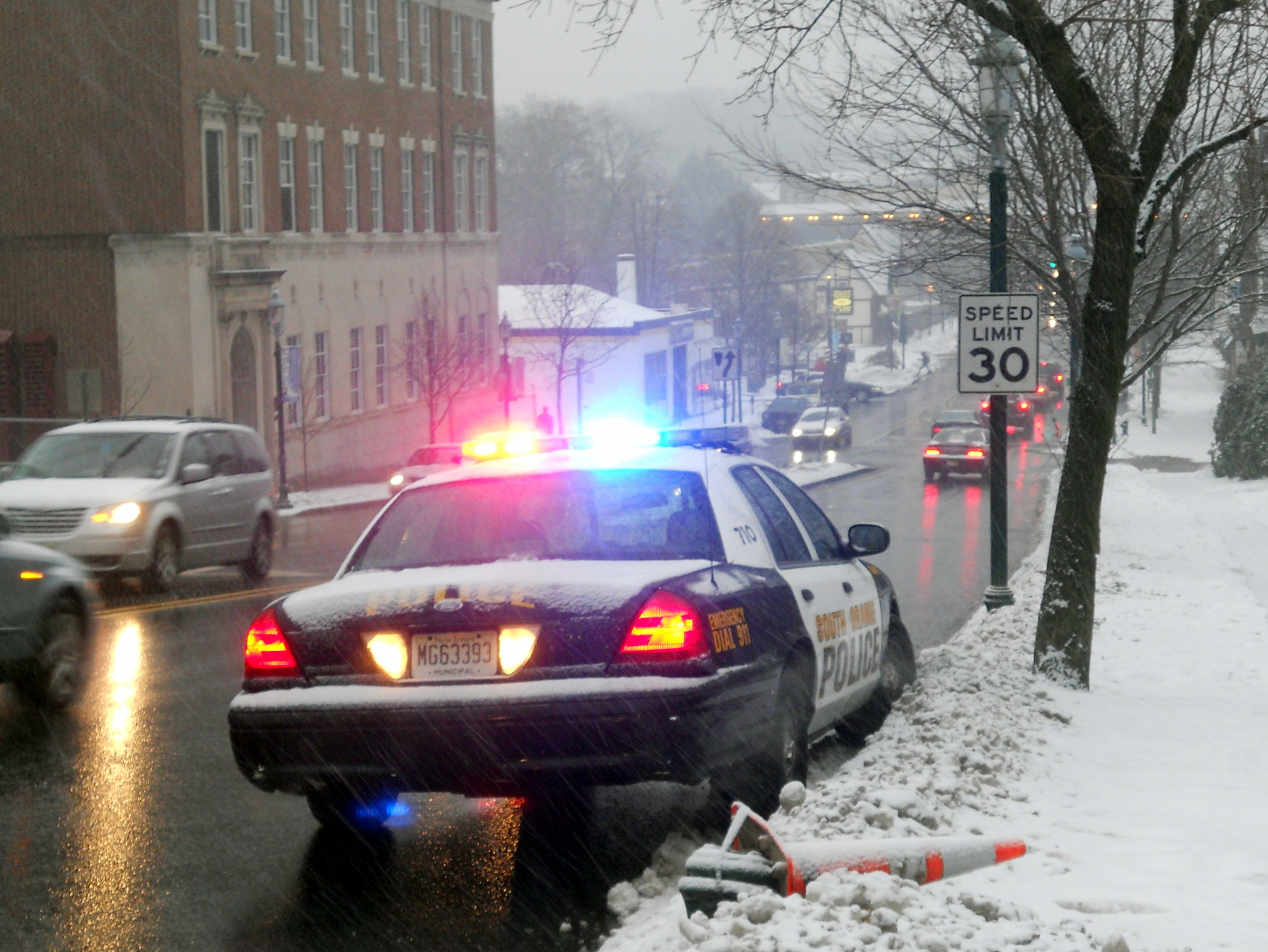
South Orange Police Department

South Orange provides police, a library of over 90,000 volumes, a municipal pool, a recreation center, parks, baseball diamonds, tennis courts, trash and yard waste removal provided by contractors, Public, educational, and government access (PEG) cable TV, among others. The school board is shared with adjacent Maplewood.

Fire protection in the village is provided by the South Essex Fire Department, which was formed in July 2022 as the successor to the former Maplewood Fire Department and South Orange Fire Department.

The South Orange Rescue Squad, formed in 1952, provides 911 EMS services to residents on a volunteer basis.

=== Local government ===
South Orange is governed under a special charter granted by the New Jersey Legislature. The village is one of 11 municipalities (of the 564) statewide that operate under a special charter. The governing body is comprised of a six-member village council and a mayor, all of which are unpaid positions. Council members are elected in non-partisan elections on an at-large basis to staggered four-year terms of office with three seats up for election in odd-numbered years. The mayor serves a four-year term of office. Local political parties are formed on an ad-hoc basis, generally focused on key issues of local concern; national political parties do not officially participate in village elections.

As of 2025, the mayor of South Orange is Sheena Collum, whose term of office ends May 17, 2027. Members of the Village Council are Braynard "Bobby" Brown (2025), Jennifer Greenberg (2027), Karen Hartshorn Hilton (2025), Bill Haskins (2025), Summer Jones (2027) and Olivia Lewis-Chang (2027).

In September 2022, Steve Schnall was appointed to fill the seat expiring in December 2023 that had been held by Bob Zuckerman until he resigned from office as he wasmoving out of South Orange.

In the May 2015 municipal election, Sheena Collum was elected as Village President, making her the first woman to serve in the position, while Deborah Davis Ford, Howard Levison and Mark Rosner ran unopposed and won new terms of office on the board of trustees.

With three incumbents not running for re-election in the May 2013 election, the slate of Walter Clarke, Sheena Collum and Stephen Schnall running together as South Orange 2013 were elected to four-year terms, with the support of Village President Alex Torpey.

In the municipal election held in May 2011, with fewer than 10% of the registered voters casting ballots, 23-year-old Alex Torpey was elected as the youngest Village President in the history of South Orange by a margin of 14 votes, while trustees Deborah Davis Ford, Howard Levison and Mark Rosner were re-elected to four-year terms of office, having run unopposed. In the 2009 elections with two incumbents not running for re-election, Michael Goldberg was elected to another four-year term, along with newcomers Janine Bauer and Nancy Gould, by a nearly 2–1 margin.

=== Federal, state, and county representation ===
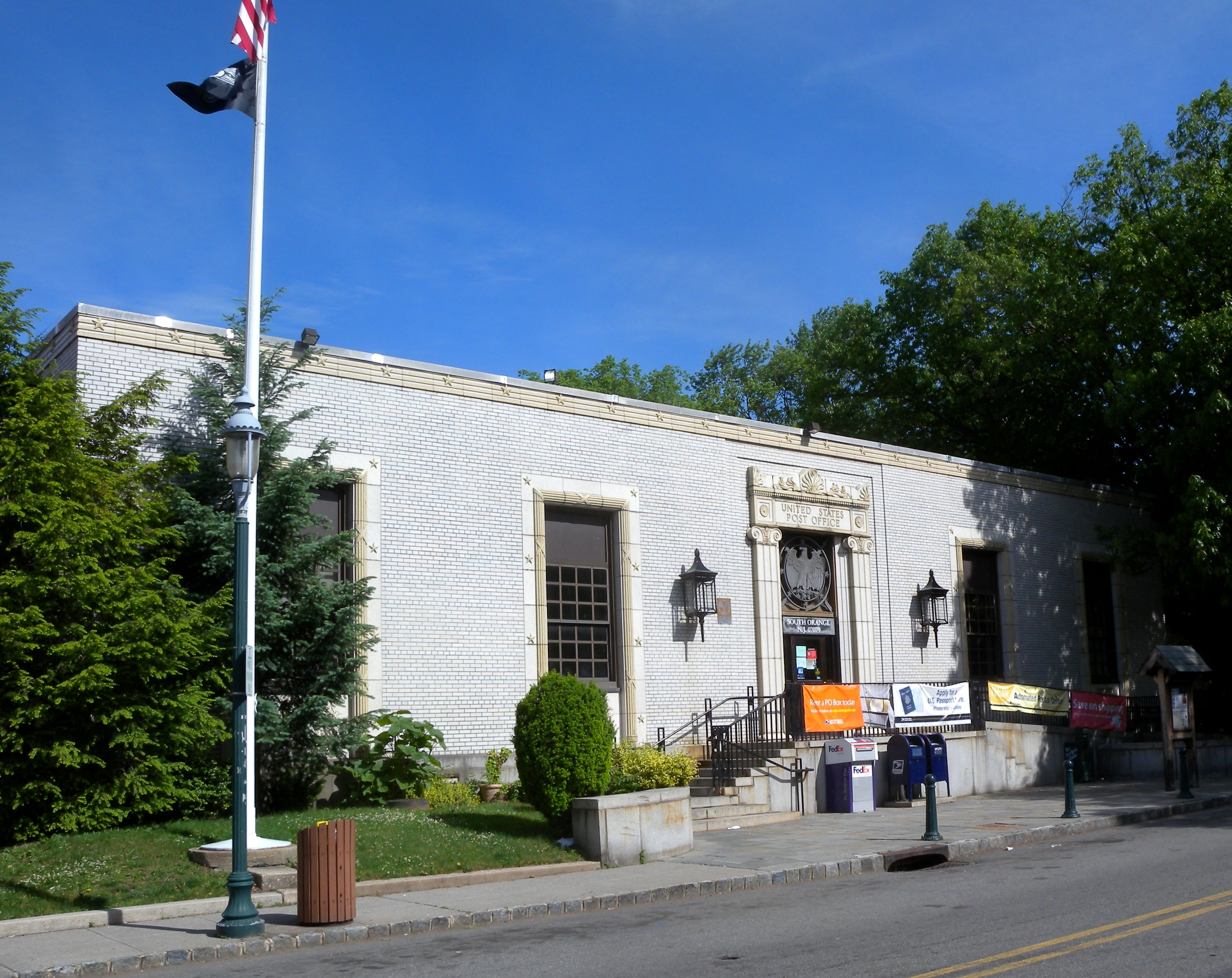
Post Office, ZIP 07079

South Orange is located in the 11th Congressional District and is part of New Jersey's 28th state legislative district.

Prior to the 2010 Census, South Orange had been split between the 8th Congressional District and the 10th Congressional District, a change made by the New Jersey Redistricting Commission that took effect in January 2013, based on the results of the November 2012 general elections.

For the 119th United States Congress, New Jersey's 11th congressional district is represented by Analilia Mejia (D, Glen Ridge) who was elected in a 2026 special election to serve for the remainder of the Congress following the resignation Mikie Sherrill (D, Montclair), who was elected Governor of New Jersey in 2025. New Jersey is represented in the United States Senate by Democrats Cory Booker (Newark, term ends 2027) and Andy Kim (Moorestown, term ends 2031).

For the 2026–2027 session, the 28th legislative district of the New Jersey Legislature is represented in the State Senate by Renee Burgess (D, Irvington) and in the General Assembly by Chigozie Onyema (D, Newark) and Cleopatra Tucker (D, Newark).

Essex County is governed by a directly elected county executive, with legislative functions performed by the Board of County Commissioners. As of 2025, the County Executive is Joseph N. DiVincenzo Jr. (D, Roseland), whose four-year term of office ends December 31, 2026. The county's Board of County Commissioners is composed of nine members, five of whom are elected from districts and four of whom are elected on an at-large basis. They are elected for three-year concurrent terms and may be re-elected to successive terms at the annual election in November. Essex County's Commissioners are:

Robert Mercado (D, District 1 – Newark's North and East Wards, parts of Central and West Wards; Newark, 2026), A'Dorian Murray-Thomas (D, District 2 – Irvington, Maplewood and parts of Newark's South and West Wards; Newark, 2026), Vice President Tyshammie L. Cooper (D, District 3 - Newark: West and Central Wards; East Orange, Orange and South Orange; East Orange, 2026), Leonard M. Luciano (D, District 4 – Caldwell, Cedar Grove, Essex Fells, Fairfield, Livingston, Millburn, North Caldwell, Roseland, Verona, West Caldwell and West Orange; West Caldwell, 2026), President Carlos M. Pomares (D, District 5 – Belleville, Bloomfield, Glen Ridge, Montclair and Nutley; Bloomfield, 2026), Brendan W. Gill (D, at large; Montclair, 2026), Romaine Graham (D, at large; Irvington, 2026), Wayne Richardson (D, at large; Newark, 2026), Patricia Sebold (D, at-large; Livingston, 2026).

Constitutional officers elected countywide are: Clerk Christopher J. Durkin (D, West Caldwell, 2025), Register of Deeds Juan M. Rivera Jr. (D, Newark, 2029), Sheriff Amir Jones (D, Newark, 2027), and Surrogate Alturrick Kenney (D, Newark, 2028).

=== Politics ===
As of 2019, there are a total of 13,564 registered voters in South Orange Village.

United States presidential election results for South Orange
Year	Republican		Democratic		Third party(ies)	
Year	No.	%	No.	%	No.	%
2024	892	9.59%	8,279	88.99%	132	1.42%
2020	896	9.15%	8,793	89.78%	105	1.07%
2016	904	10.52%	7,445	86.60%	248	2.88%
2012	1,270	16.08%	6,566	83.13%	62	0.79%
2008	1,569	17.73%	7,228	81.67%	53	0.60%
2004	1,883	21.97%	6,641	77.50%	45	0.53%

In the 2012 presidential election, Democrat Barack Obama received 83.1% of the vote (6,566 cast), ahead of Republican Mitt Romney with 16.1% (1,270 votes), and other candidates with 0.8% (62 votes), among the 7,962 ballots cast by the village's 12,623 registered voters (64 ballots were spoiled), for a turnout of 63.1%. In the 2008 presidential election, Democrat Barack Obama received 81.1% of the vote (7,228 cast), ahead of Republican John McCain with 17.6% (1,569 votes) and other candidates with 0.6% (53 votes), among the 8,913 ballots cast by the village's 12,243 registered voters, for a turnout of 72.8%. In the 2004 presidential election, Democrat John Kerry received 77.3% of the vote (6,641 ballots cast), outpolling Republican George W. Bush with 21.9% (1,883 votes) and other candidates with 0.4% (45 votes), among the 8,590 ballots cast by the village's 10,990 registered voters, for a turnout percentage of 78.2.

Gubernatorial election results for South Orange
Year	Republican		Democratic		Third party(ies)	
Year	No.	%	No.	%	No.	%
2025	808	9.93%	7,302	89.73%	28	0.34%
2021	648	10.51%	5,465	88.65%	52	0.84%
2017	546	10.06%	4,740	87.31%	143	2.63%
2013	1,469	30.29%	3,314	68.33%	67	1.38%
2009	1,119	18.66%	4,575	76.30%	302	5.04%
2005	1,136	20.51%	4,303	77.70%	99	1.79%

In the 2013 gubernatorial election, Democrat Barbara Buono received 68.3% of the vote (3,314 cast), ahead of Republican Chris Christie with 30.3% (1,469 votes), and other candidates with 1.4% (67 votes), among the 4,963 ballots cast by the village's 12,656 registered voters (113 ballots were spoiled), for a turnout of 39.2%. In the 2009 gubernatorial election, Democrat Jon Corzine received 74.6% of the vote (4,275 ballots cast), ahead of Republican Chris Christie with 19.5% (1,119 votes), Independent Chris Daggett with 4.8% (273 votes) and other candidates with 0.5% (29 votes), among the 5,727 ballots cast by the village's 12,184 registered voters, yielding a 47.0% turnout.

United States Senate election results for South Orange1
Year	Republican		Democratic		Third party(ies)	
Year	No.	%	No.	%	No.	%
2024	915	9.98%	8,090	88.23%	164	1.79%
2018	811	11.60%	6,037	86.34%	144	2.06%
2012	1,136	15.50%	6,051	82.55%	143	1.95%
2006	1,124	19.74%	4,484	78.75%	86	1.51%

United States Senate election results for South Orange2
Year	Republican		Democratic		Third party(ies)	
Year	No.	%	No.	%	No.	%
2020	972	10.08%	8,527	88.40%	147	1.52%
2014	545	12.38%	3,794	86.19%	63	1.43%
2013	495	11.99%	3,596	87.11%	37	0.90%
2008	1,528	19.30%	6,252	78.95%	139	1.76%

== Education ==
The village shares a common school system, the South Orange-Maplewood School District, with the adjacent township of Maplewood. The district has a single high school (located in Maplewood, nearly on the border of the two towns), two middle schools, a central pre-school and neighborhood elementary schools, distributed between the two municipalities. As of the 2019–20 school year, the district, comprised of 11 schools, had an enrollment of 7,353 students and 576.1 classroom teachers (on an FTE basis), for a student–teacher ratio of 12.8:1. As of the 2021-22 school year, the district has implemented an intentional integration initiative that aims to rebalance the district's elementary and middle schools via socio-economic status. Schools in the district (with 2019–20 school enrollment data from the National Center for Education Statistics) are Montrose Early Childhood Center (133 students, in PreK; located in Maplewood), Seth Boyden Elementary Demonstration School (493 students, in grades K–5 located in Maplewood), Clinton Elementary School (605, K–5; Maplewood), Jefferson Elementary School (544, 3–5; Maplewood), Marshall Elementary School (518, K–2; South Orange), South Mountain Elementary School (647, K–5; South Orange), South Mountain Elementary School Annex (NA, K–1; South Orange), Tuscan Elementary School (K–5, 637; Maplewood), Maplewood Middle School (827, 6–8; Maplewood), South Orange Middle School (786, 6–8; South Orange) and Columbia High School (1,967, 9–12; Maplewood).

=== Private schools ===
Founded in 1890, Our Lady of Sorrows School is a K–8 elementary school operated by the Roman Catholic Archdiocese of Newark. The all-girls Marylawn of the Oranges Academy closed at the conclusion of the 2012–13 school year due to declining enrollment and fiscal challenges.

=== Higher education ===
Seton Hall University, which serves approximately 9,700 students, was founded in 1856 by the Roman Catholic Archdiocese of Newark and named after Elizabeth Ann Seton, the first American Catholic saint. The Division I university is located along the east side of South Orange Avenue, the community's main boulevard.

== Transportation ==
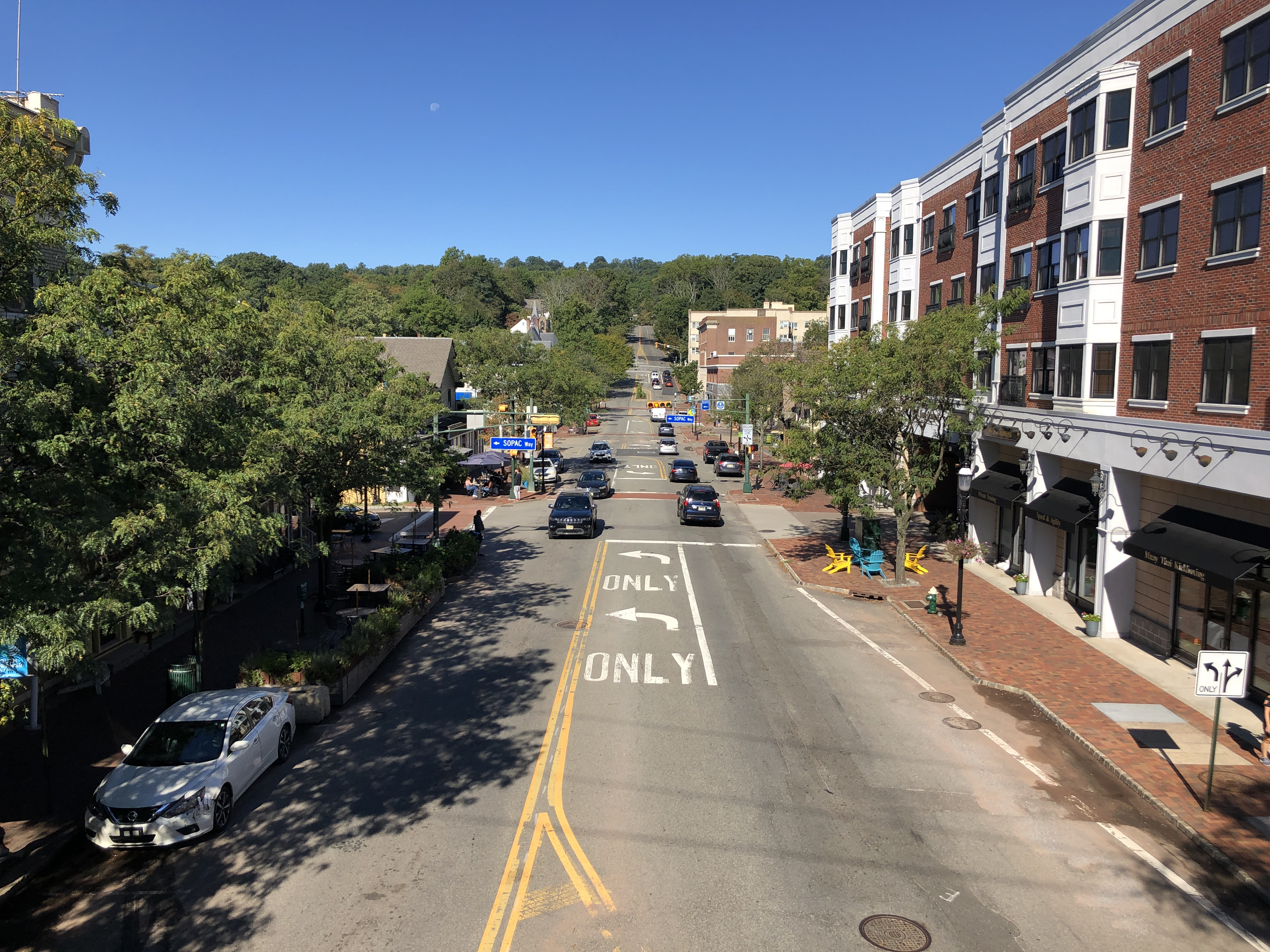
County Route 510 westbound in South Orange

=== Roads and highways ===
As of May 2010, the village had a total of 48.76 miles (78.47 km) of roadways, of which 42.88 miles (69.01 km) were maintained by the municipality and 5.88 miles (9.46 km) by Essex County.

The county roads serving South Orange include County Route 510 (South Orange Avenue) and County Route 577 (Wyoming Avenue). Principal local roads include Valley Street / Scotland Road, Irvington Avenue and Centre Street.

=== Public transportation ===
South Orange is served by two NJ Transit railroad stations: the South Orange station, located on South Orange Avenue near the intersection of Sloan Street and the Mountain Station, located in the Montrose section of South Orange. The two stations provide service along the Morris and Essex Line to Newark Broad Street Station and either to New York Penn Station (some stopping at Secaucus Junction) or Hoboken Terminal.

NJ Transit operates three bus lines that run through South Orange. These include the 92 route which goes from South Orange train station to Branch Brook Park in Newark, and the 107 route which goes from South Orange Train Station to the Port Authority Bus Terminal in New York City. The 31 bus line, which travels between South Orange and Newark Penn Station, also makes stops along South Orange Avenue.

There is a shuttle connecting South Orange to Livingston, timed with connecting Morristown Line trains.

== Local media ==
WSOU-FM, "Seton Hall's Pirate Radio", is a non-commercial educational public radio station licensed to South Orange since 1948 with studios, offices, and transmitter on the campus of Seton Hall University while operating at 89.5 FM.

The News-Record weekly newspaper reports on both South Orange and Maplewood.

"The Village Green", a hyperlocal news site, reports on both South Orange and Maplewood, and includes a daily email newsletter.

South Orange Patch provides local news and events and latest headlines.

The Gaslight is a quarterly newsletter managed by the local government that focuses on the on-goings of South Orange, NJ. Additionally, the newsletter offers advertisements sponsoring local public figures, businesses and job opportunities for the general public.

== Community information ==
- The town was the first in the nation to have an affinity credit card, the idea of the municipal affinity credit card being originated by former village president William Calabrese.
- When the town was wired for telephones and electricity in the early 20th century, the poles and wires were not allowed to run along the curb lines of streets as they do in most towns. In some sections they run along property lines in the middle of blocks, and in others they run underground. This is aesthetically pleasing but complicates access to the lines, and it delayed the introduction of cable television. Occasional proposals to replace gas lights with electric lights run across the obstacle that there is no source of electric power along the streets.
- The current 761, 762, and 763 telephone exchanges used for most lines in South Orange and Maplewood, originated as the exchange names South Orange 1,2, and 3.
- Until April 25, 2024, South Orange's full official name was the "Township of South Orange Village." This name was originally adopted in lieu of the Village of South Orange because it allowed South Orange to receive more federal aid that was directed to Townships during the 1970s as many federal authorities were unfamiliar with the New Jersey municipal system, in which a township is not formally different from any other municipal designation. Other municipalities in New Jersey also adopted similar strategies, notably the Township of the Borough of Verona.
- South Orange was the first municipality in New Jersey to recognize civil unions for homosexual couples. Exactly one hour after unions became legal in South Orange, they were recognized in neighboring Maplewood.
