= South Orange Village Hall =

- U.S. National Register of Historic Places
- New Jersey Register of Historic Places
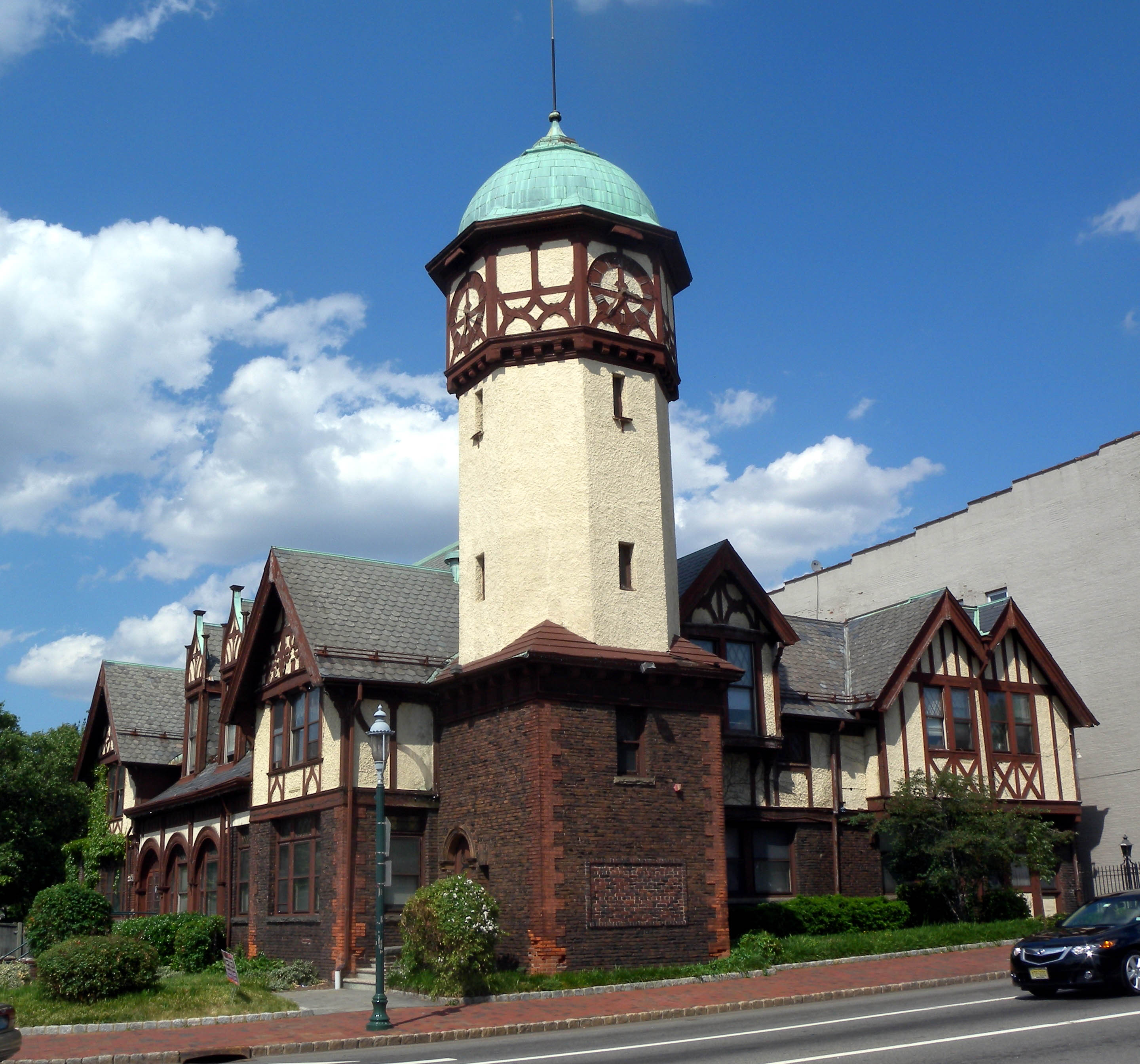
- South Orange Village Hall in 2009

- Location within Essex County, New Jersey Location within New Jersey Location within the United States
- Location: South Orange Avenue and Scotland Road, South Orange, New Jersey
- Coordinates: 40°44′46″N 74°15′30″W
- Area: 0.5 acres (0.20 ha)
- Built: 1894
- Architect: Rossiter & Wright
- NRHP reference No.: 76001152
- NJRHP No.: 1363

Significant dates
- Added to NRHP: May 28, 1976
- Designated NJRHP: December 8, 1975

South Orange Village Hall is located in South Orange, Essex County, New Jersey, United States. The building was designed by Rossiter & Wright and built in 1894. The building was added to the New Jersey Register of Historic Places on December 8, 1975 and was added to the National Register of Historic Places on May 28, 1976.

== See also ==
- National Register of Historic Places listings in Essex County, New Jersey
