= Ehrick Rossiter =

American architect

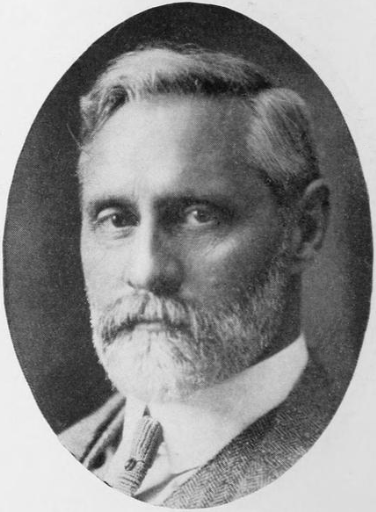
- Born: Ehrick Kensett Rossiter; September 14, 1854; Paris, France
- Died: October 14, 1941 (aged 87); White Plains, New York, US
- Education: Cornell University
- Occupation: Architect

Ehrick Kensett Rossiter (September 14, 1854 – October 14, 1941) was an American architect known for the country homes he designed.

== Biography ==
Rossiter was born to American parents in Paris, France, on September 14, 1854. His father, Thomas Pritchard Rossiter (1818-1871), was a Hudson River School artist.

Ehrick attended The Gunnery school in Washington, Connecticut, graduating in 1871. He then studied architecture at Cornell University, where he received a degree in 1875.

He practiced architecture in New York City from 1877 until 1921, working first with partner Frank A. Wright and later with John Muller. He designed residential, institutional and public buildings in New England, New York, New Jersey and Maryland, many of which are now designated as historic properties.

Rossiter was a member of the American Institute of Architects and the Architectural League of New York. He retired in 1921 and subsequently made his home in Washington, Connecticut. He died in White Plains, New York, on October 14, 1941.

== Works ==
Among Rossiter's architectural designs are 25 estate homes, referred to as "summer cottages", and artist's studios in Washington, Connecticut, most in the Queen Anne ("shingle style") and Colonial Revival styles. Rossiter buildings in Washington include:

- Rock Gate, completed in 1885 for Lucius A. Barbour, owner of the Willimantic Linen Company and a Freemason.
- His own country home, called the Rocks, which was started in 1882 and built over two decades
- The Sumacs, completed in 1894 for artist William Hamilton Gibson
- Glen Holme, completed in 1898 for industrialist William Leslie Van Sinderen, which now houses the administrative offices of the Devereux Glenholme School
- The Alders (now the Manor House Inn), a Victorian Tudor mansion in Norfolk, Connecticut, 1898
- Kirby Corners, completed in 1900 for U.S. Senator Orville Hitchcock Platt
- The clubhouse of the Washington Club, completed in 1906
- The Gunn Memorial Library, opened in 1908. Rossiter donated the design for the building, which was built using fieldstone and wood donated by local farmers and merchants.
- The Standish House commissioned by Ruth Standish Bowles Baldwin and completed in 1910. Rossiter purchased the house in 1919 for his own use and renamed it Edgewood.
- Saint John's Episcopal Church, built in 1918.
- Glen Haven District No. 4 School and Public Library, 7325 Fair Haven Rd., Homer, NY
- Haystack Mountain Tower, 43 North St., Norfolk, CT, near Rossiter's summer home in northern Litchfield County, Connecticut
- Hepburn Library, 1 Hepburn St., Norfolk, NY
- South Orange Village Hall, S. Orange Ave. and Scotland Rd., South Orange, NJ, as Rossiter & Wright
- One or more buildings in Washington Green Historic District, Roughly, along Ferry Bridge, Green Hill, Kirby, Roxbury, Wykeham and Woodbury Rds., Parsonage Ln. and The Green, Washington, CT
- One or more buildings in Prospect Hill Historic District, in New Haven, CT

Other Rossiter designs include:

- The Boulders in New Preston, Connecticut, built in 1890 and currently used as a country inn following extensive interior remodeling.
- The Norfolk Music Shed in Norfolk, Connecticut, built in 1907 and the site of the Norfolk Chamber Music Festival
- Hepburn Library at Norfolk, New York
- Hepburn Library of Colton at Colton, New York.

== Conservation ==
In 1889 Rossiter bought about 100 acres (40 ha) of land in the Shepaug River valley in Washington, Connecticut, in order to protect the land from logging. This parcel later became the first piece of the Steep Rock Land Trust, which he established with a 1925 donation of 186 acres (75 ha). Through purchases and donations, the land trust's holdings have since increased to 2,700 acres (1,100 ha).

== Gallery ==
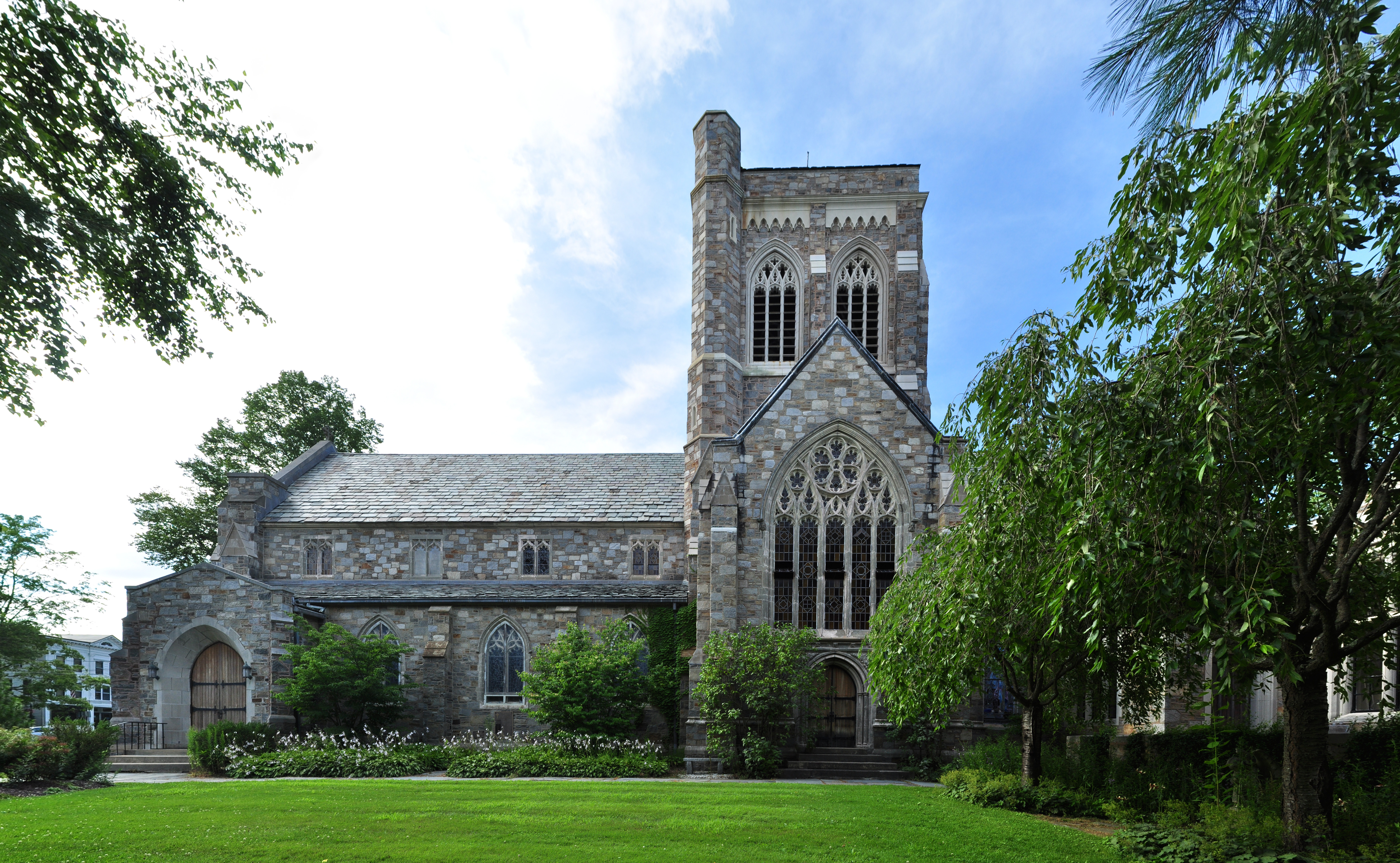
The Rossiter-designed St. Michael's Church (Episcopal), Litchfield, Connecticut (consecrated 1921; photos 2013).

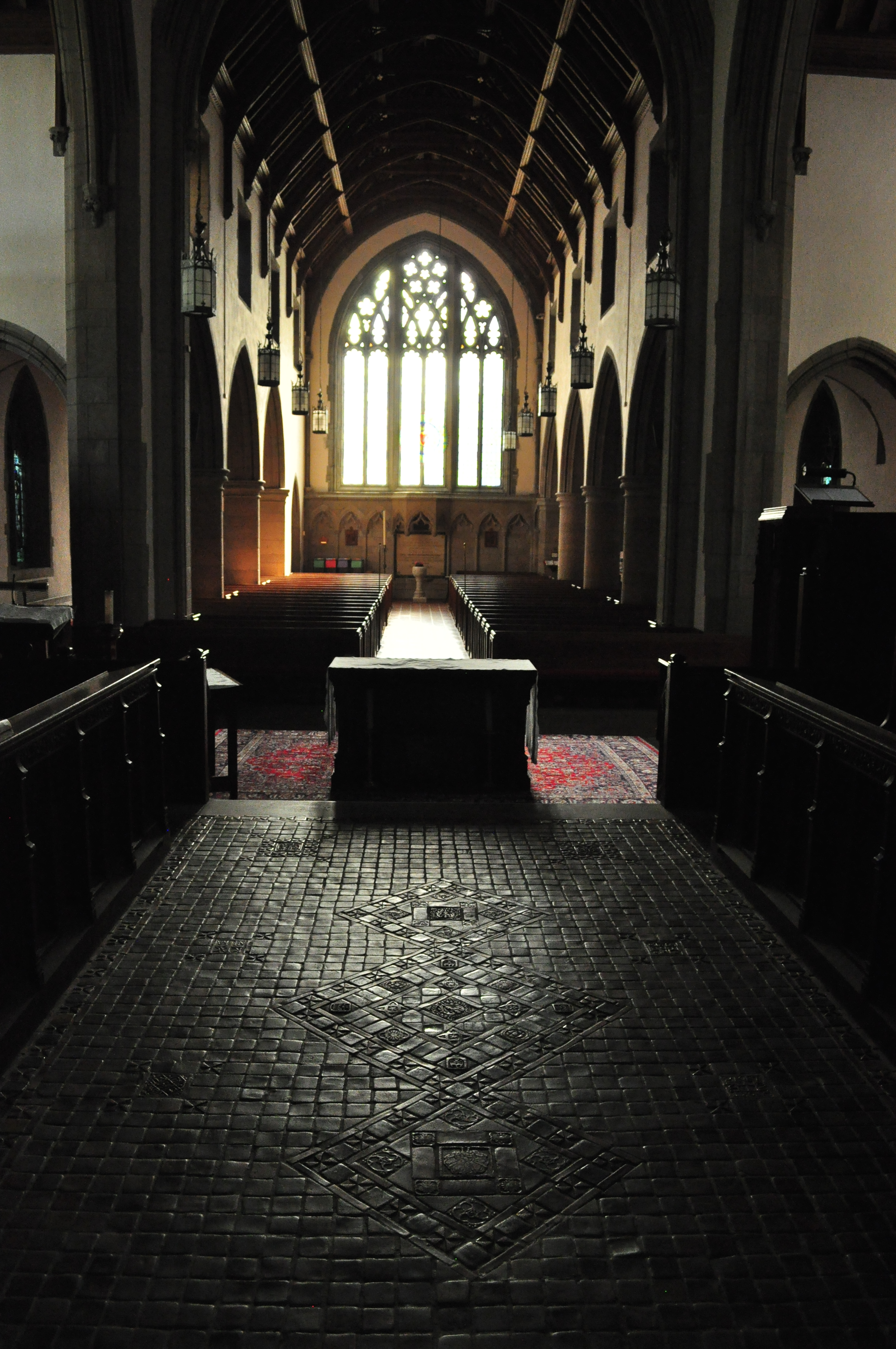
Interior of St. Michael's.

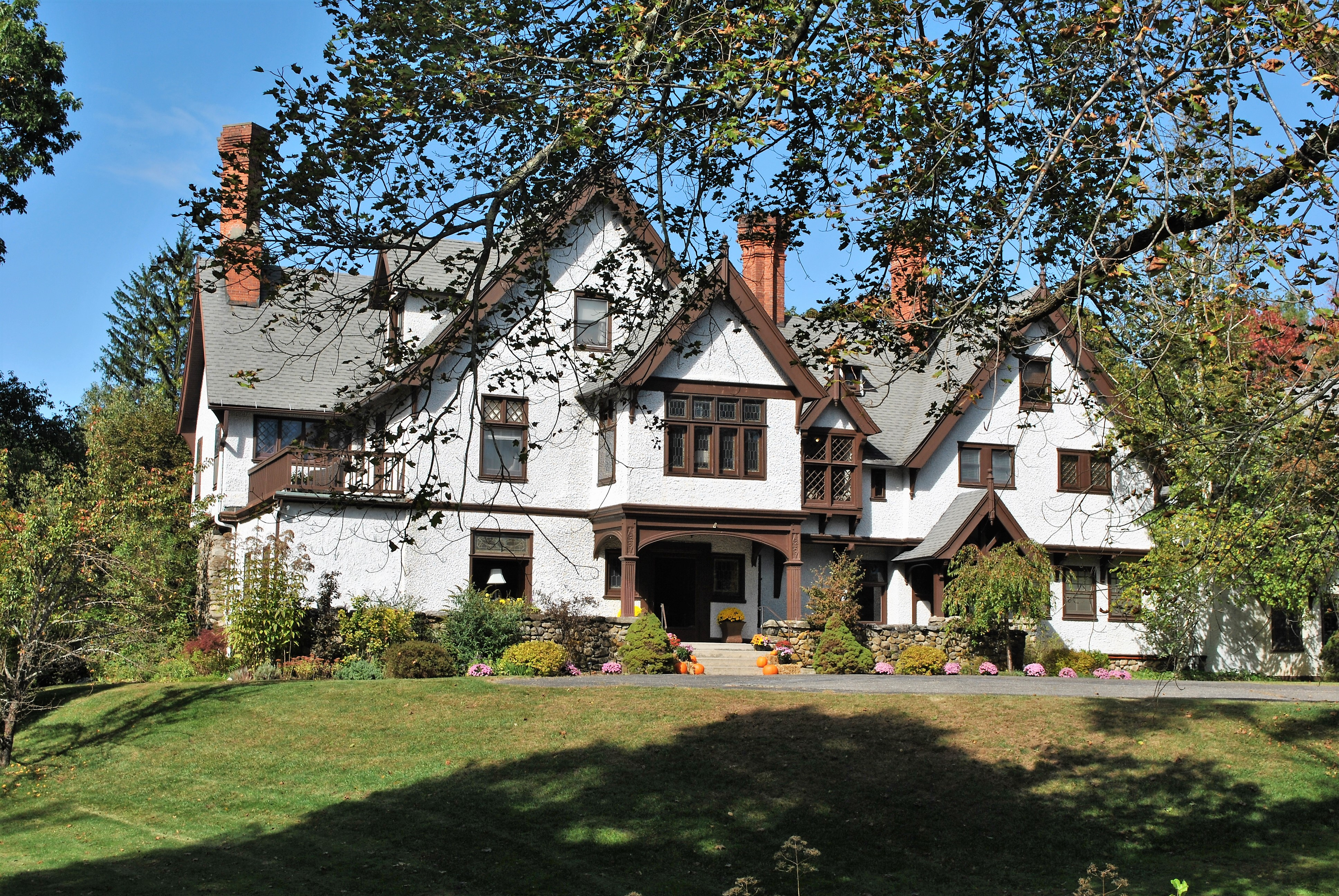
The Alders (now Manor House), a Victorian Tudor mansion in Norfolk, Connecticut, 1898
