= Murphy House =

Murphy House may refer to:

- Samuel R. Murphy House, Eutaw, Alabama, listed on the National Register of Historic Places (NRHP) in Greene County
- The Murphy House, Montgomery, Alabama, NRHP-listed in Montgomery County
- Murphy-Collins House, Tuscaloosa, Alabama, listed on the NRHP in Tuscaloosa County
- Charles H. Murphy Sr. House, El Dorado, Arkansas, listed on the NRHP in Union County
- William J. Murphy House, Fort Smith, Arkansas, listed on the NRHP in Sebastian County
- Boone-Murphy House, Pine Bluff, Arkansas, listed on the NRHP in Jefferson County
- Gage/Murphy House, Prescott, Arizona, listed on the NRHP in Yavapai County
- Carter House Inn, also known as Murphy House, Eureka, California, replica of destroyed San Francisco house, NRHP-listed in Humboldt County
- D. J. Murphy House, Livermore, California, listed on the NRHP in California
- Cosier-Murphy House, New Fairfield, Connecticut, listed on the NRHP in Fairfield County
- Patrick Murphy House (Windsor, Connecticut), listed on the NRHP in Hartford County
- Murphy-Burroughs House, Fort Myers, Florida, NRHP-listed in Lee County
- Daniel F. Murphy House, Boise, Idaho, listed on the NRHP in Ada County
- W. H. Murphy House, Shoshone, Idaho, listed on the NRHP in Lincoln County
- Henry H. Smith/J.H. Murphy House, Davenport, Iowa, NRHP-listed in Scott County
- Stephen Murphy House, Little Hickman, Kentucky, listed on the NRHP in Madison County
- William Murphy House, Brookline, Massachusetts, NRHP-listed in Norfolk County
- Patrick Murphy Three-Decker, Worcester, Massachusetts, NRHP-listed in Worcester County
- Timothy Murphy House, Crystal Falls, Michigan, listed on the NRHP in Iron County
- Frank Murphy Birthplace, Harbor Beach, Michigan, NRHP-listed in Huron County
- Hinkle-Murphy House, Minneapolis, Minnesota, NRHP-listed in Hennepin County
- Patrick Murphy House (Natchez, Mississippi), listed on the NRHP in Adams County, Mississippi
- John T. Murphy House, Helena, Montana, listed on the NRHP in Lewis and Clark County
- William L. and Sydney V. Murphy House, Lincoln, Nebraska, listed on the NRHP in Lancaster County
- Murphy-Lamb House and Cemetery, Garland, North Carolina, listed on the NRHP in Sampson County
- Dixon-Leftwich-Murphy House, Greensboro, North Carolina, listed on the NRHP in Guilford County
- Daniel Murphy Log House, St. Martin, Ohio, listed on the NRHP in Brown County
- George A. Murphy House, Muskogee, Oklahoma, listed on the NRHP in Muskogee County
- Murphy House (Stillwater, Oklahoma), listed on the NRHP in Payne County
- Lester and Hazel Murphy House, Hood River, Oregon, NRHP-listed in Hood River County
- Paul C. Murphy House, Portland, Oregon, NRHP-listed
- Paul F. Murphy House, Portland, Oregon, NRHP-listed
- Dennis J. Murphy House at Ogden Farm, Middletown, Rhode Island, NRHP-listed
- Mrs. J. V. Murphy House, Victoria, Texas, NRHP-listed in Victoria County
- Martin Murphy House, Sunnyvale, California, see Sunnyvale Heritage Park Museum

== See also ==
- Patrick Murphy House (disambiguation)
