= Chapman House =

Chapman House can refer to: (sorted by state, then city/town)

- Withers-Chapman House, Huntsville, Alabama, listed on the National Register of Historic Places (NRHP)
- John G. Chapman House, Arcata, California, listed on the NRHP in Humboldt County
- A. H. Chapman House, Chico, California, NRHP-listed
- David Chapman Farmstead, Ledyard, Connecticut, listed on the NRHP in New London County
- Taylor Chapman House, Windsor, Connecticut, listed on the NRHP in Hartford County
- Chapman-Steed House, Crawfordville, Georgia, listed on the NRHP in Taliaferro County
- Hunt House (Griffin, Georgia), also known as the Chapman-Kincaid-Hunt House, NRHP-listed in Spalding County
- John Chapman Plantation, Jeffersonville, Georgia, listed on the NRHP in Twiggs County
- Chapman-Noble House, Wichita, Kansas, listed on the NRHP in Sedgwick County
- Chapman-Hall House, Damariscotta, Maine, listed on the NRHP in Lincoln County
- Leonard Bond Chapman House, Portland, Maine, listed on the NRHP in Cumberland County
- Charles Chapman House, Mankato, Minnesota, listed on the NRHP in Blue Earth County
- J. M. Chapman House, Montclair, New Jersey, NRHP-listed
- Chapman Farmhouse, Duanesburg, New York, NRHP-listed
- Sutton-Chapman-Howland House, Newark Valley, New York, NRHP-listed
- Chapman House (Syracuse, New York), NRHP-listed
- A. F. Chapman House, Watkins Glen, New York, NRHP-listed
- Chapman House (Nova Scotia), a National Historic Site of Canada
- Chapman-Hutchinson House, Dublin, Ohio, listed on the NRHP in Franklin County
- John A. Chapman House, Wellington, Ohio, listed on the NRHP in Lorain County
- John Chapman House, Upper Makefield Township, Pennsylvania, NRHP-listed
- Chapman House (Austin, Texas), listed on the NRHP in Travis County
- Oscar H. Chapman House, Waxahachie, Texas, listed on the NRHP in Ellis County
