= William Murphy House =

Historic house in Massachusetts, United States

- U.S. National Register of Historic Places
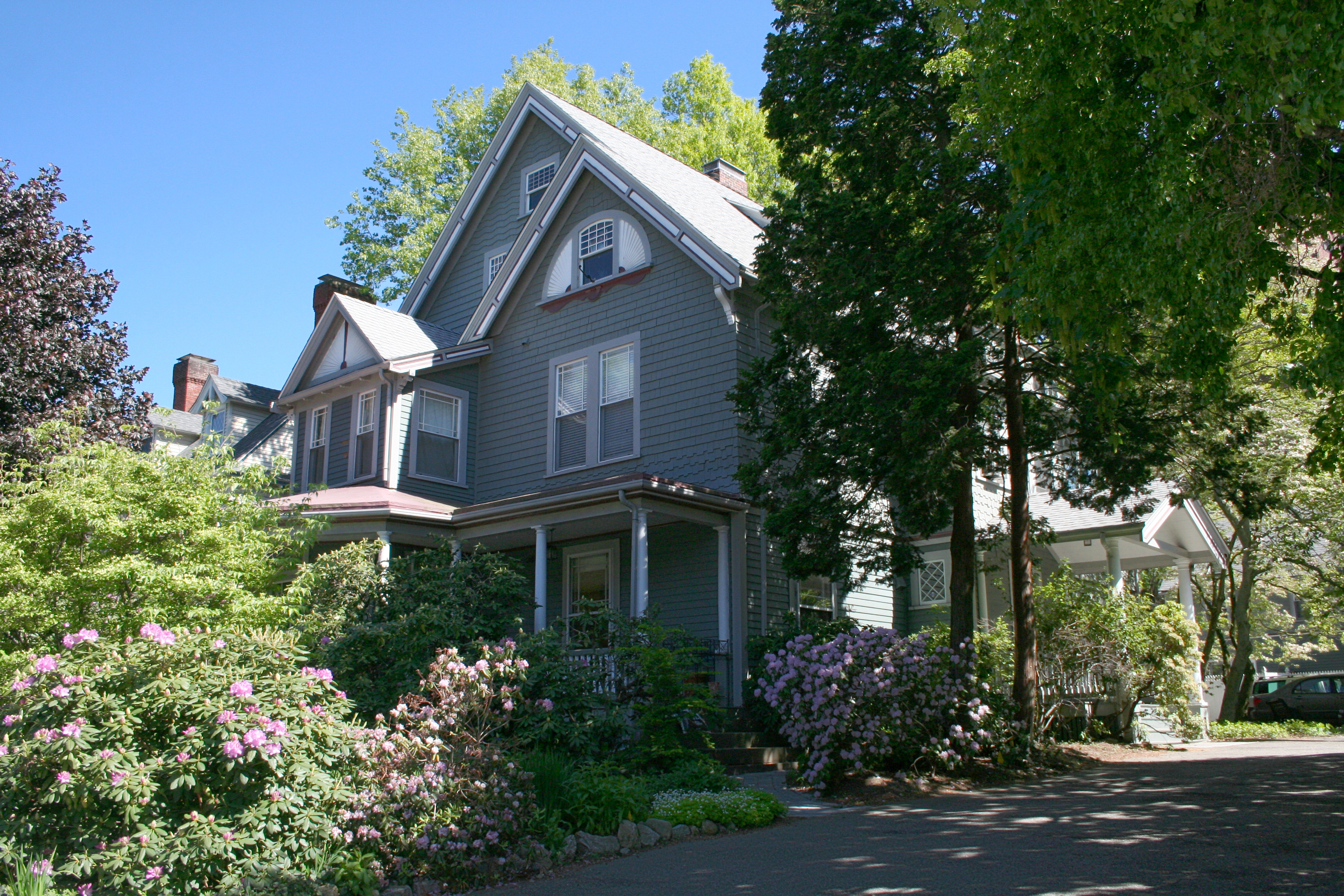

- Location within Massachusetts Location within the United States
- Location: 97 Sewall Avenue, Brookline, Massachusetts
- Coordinates: 42°20′30″N 71°7′0.3″W
- Built: 1886
- Architectural style: Queen Anne
- MPS: Brookline MRA
- NRHP reference No.: 85003303
- Added to NRHP: October 17, 1985

The William Murphy House is a historic house located in Brookline, Massachusetts.

== Description and history ==
This 2 1/2-story wood-frame house was built in 1886 by Waldo Stearns, and is a well-preserved local example of a Queen Anne Victorian. It was purchased in 1930 by Doctor William Parry Murphy, who shared the 1934 Nobel Prize in Physiology or Medicine for discovering a cure for pernicious anemia. (The home of one of Murphy's corecipients, Dr. George Minot, is also located in Brookline, and is a National Historic Landmark.)

The house was listed on the National Register of Historic Places on October 17, 1985.

== See also ==
- National Register of Historic Places listings in Brookline, Massachusetts
