= Patrick Murphy House =

Patrick Murphy House may refer to:

- Patrick Murphy House (Windsor, Connecticut), listed on the National Register of Historic Places (NRHP) in Hartford County, Connecticut
- Patrick Murphy Three-Decker, Worcester, Massachusetts, NRHP-listed
- Patrick Murphy House (Natchez, Mississippi), listed on the NRHP in Adams County, Mississippi

== See also ==
- Murphy House (disambiguation)
