= Martin Murphy House =

Historic site in Santa Clara County, California, United States

- Bay View, or Home Of Martin Murphy Jr.
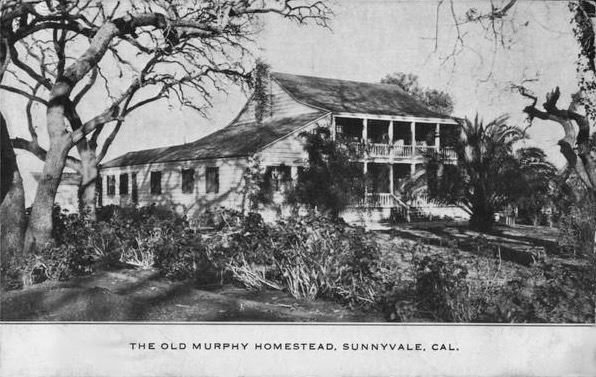
- Postcard of the Martin Murphy Jr. Homestead

- Location in Santa Clara County
- 37°22′56″N 122°1′33″W
- Location: 252 North Sunnyvale Avenue, Sunnyvale, California, U.S.

History
- Founder: Martin Murphy Jr.
- Built: 1850
- Original use: Home
- Demolished: 1961

California Historical Landmark
- Official name: Home of Martin Murphy Jr.
- Designated: May 22, 1960
- Reference no.: 644

The Martin Murphy House, or Bay View (1850–1961) was a historic home in Santa Clara County, California. It was the residence and farm of Martin Murphy Jr., who journeyed to California with his family in 1844, as part of the first wagon train to cross the Sierra Nevada. As the founder of Sunnyvale, Murphy constructed a prefabricated lumber house in the area, which had been transported around Cape Horn in 1849. It was the first frame house in the area. The Murphy family maintained their residency in the house until 1953 when the city of Sunnyvale took ownership of the property. In 1961, a fire destroyed the house. The California Historical Landmark #644 marks the location of the former Murphy's residence at Murphy Park in Sunnyvale, California.

== History ==
Replica of the Murphy House, Sunnyvale.

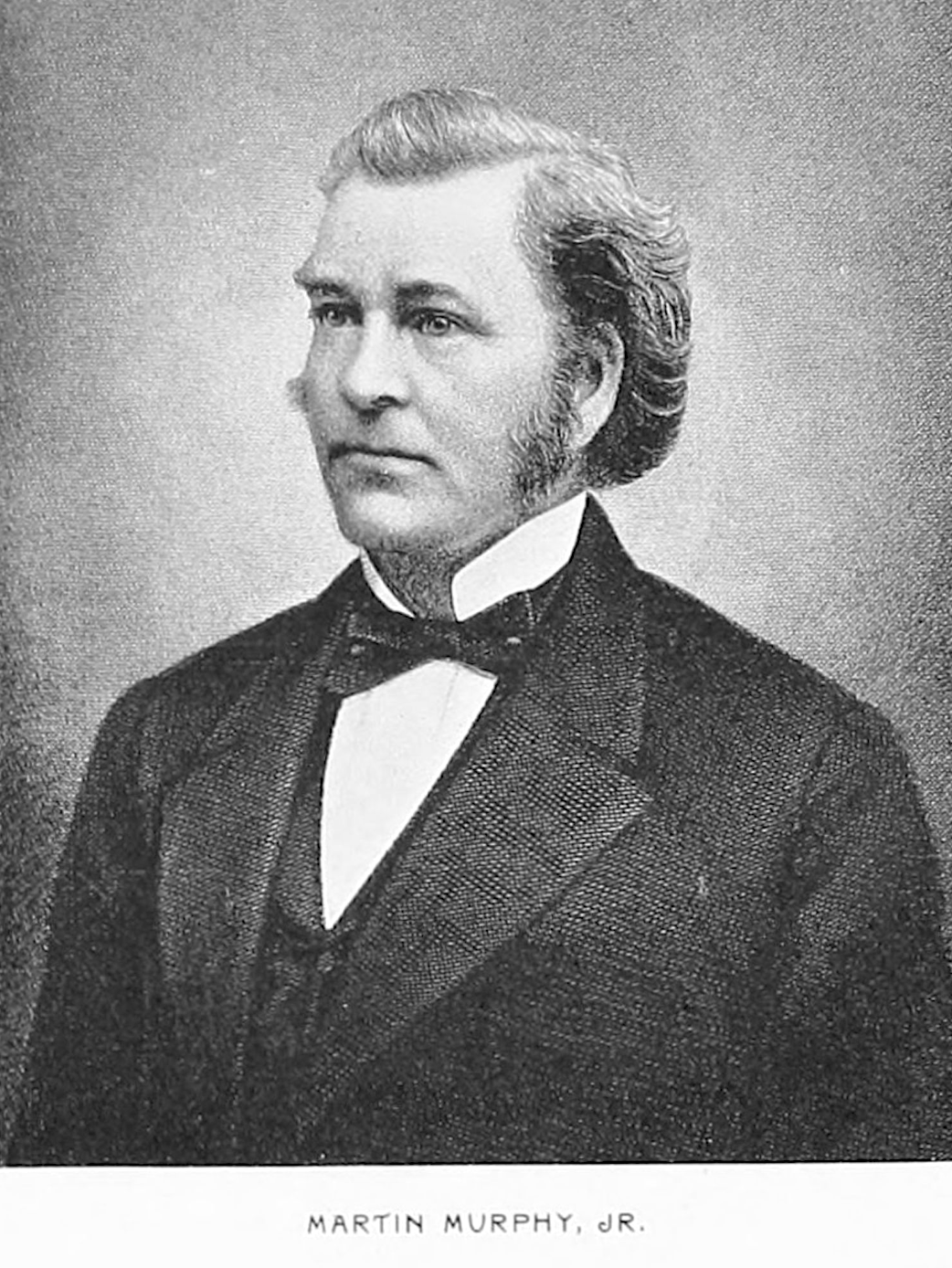
Martin Murphy Jr.

Martin Murphy Jr. (1807–1884) moved to California with his family in 1844, becoming part of a pioneering wagon train that was the first to cross the Sierra Mountains in 1844. The Stephens–Townsend–Murphy Party wagon train was composed of the Stephens family, Townsend family, and the Murphy family, and used oxen to pull their covered wagons.

In 1849, Murphy Jr. relocated to the Santa Clara Valley and purchased half of the Rancho Pastoria de las Borregas from Mariano Castro for $12,500 (equivalent to $483,750 in 2025) in 1850. Murphy established a wheat farm and cattle ranch. In 1850, he commissioned a prefabricated wood-frame house from a lumber mill in New England. He arranged for it to be shipped around Cape Horn and then reconstructed on his newly acquired property. Due to its unobstructed view of the southern region of San Francisco Bay, the Murphy family renamed it "Bay View." The 20-room home was located at 252 North Sunnyvale Avenue.

The Murphy family maintained their residency in the house until 1953.

The house was demolished in 1961 due to extensive termite and fire damage. The Sunnyvale Heritage Park Museum constructed a replica of the Murphy House next to the Sunnyvale Community Center. The dedicated and opening took place in October 2008, serving as a tribute to the contributions made by the Murphy family. A small museum was established in Murphy Park with the purpose of safeguarding and showcasing preserved artifacts from the Murphy house and other aspects Sunnyvale's history.

== State historical landmark ==
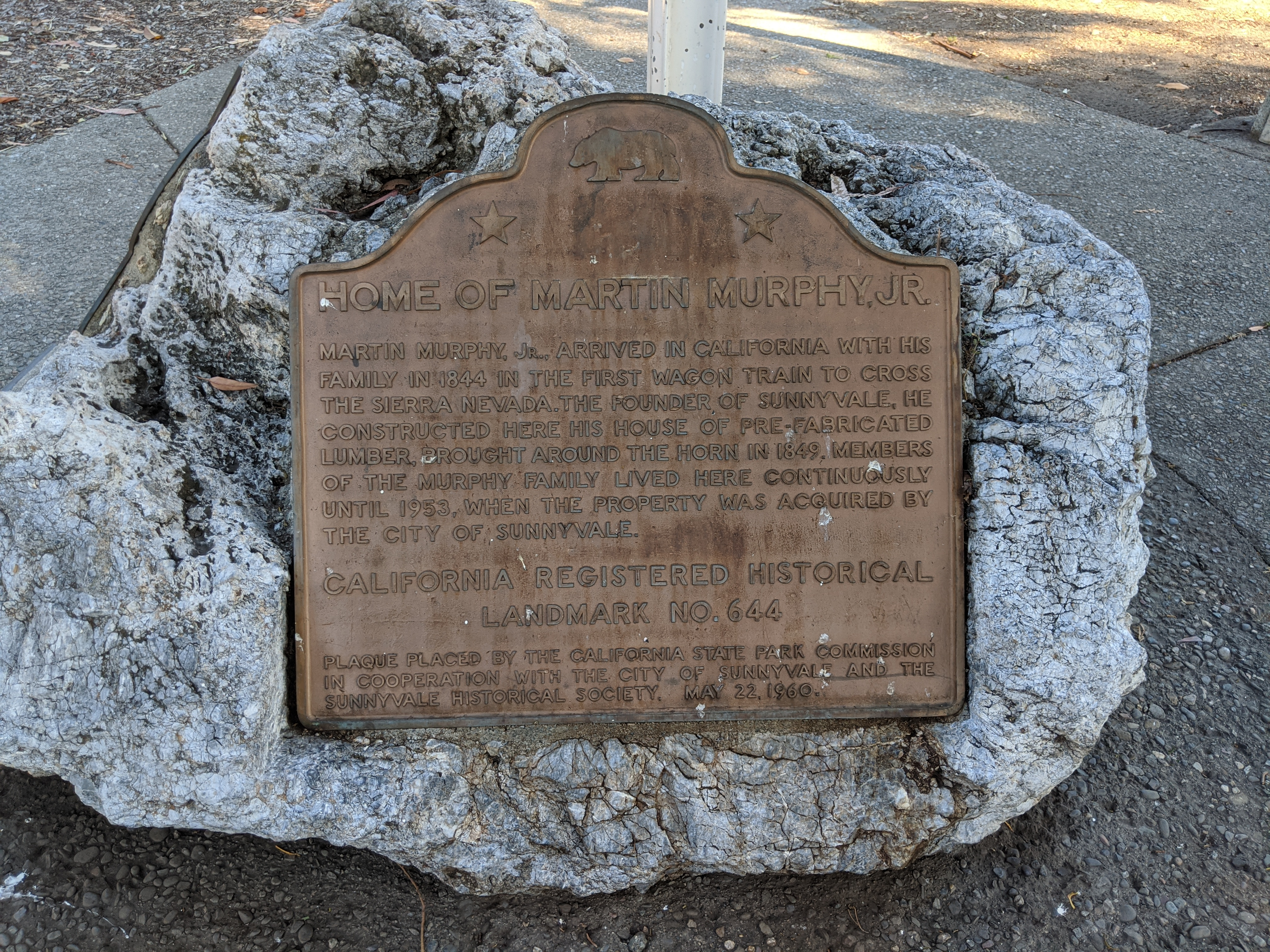
Martin Murphy Home plaque

On May 22, 1960, the California State Park Commission in cooperation with the city of Sunnyvale and the Sunnyvale Heritage Park Museum erected a commemorative plaque, that designates the site as California Historical Landmark #644, the homesite of Martin Murphy Jr. The marker is at 250 North Sunnyvale Avenue.

The inscription on the plaque reads:

Martin Murphy, Jr., arrived in California with his family in 1844 in the first wagon train to cross the Sierra Nevada. The founder of Sunnyvale, he constructed here his house of pre-fabricated lumber brought around the Horn in 1849. Members of the Murphy family lived here continuously until 1953, when the property was acquired by the City of Sunnyvale. The house was destroyed by fire in 1961.

== See also ==
- California Historical Landmarks in Santa Clara County
