= Eastward =

Eastward may refer to:

- The cardinal direction East
- Eastward (Montclair, New Jersey), US, a historic building
- Eastward (album), by Gary Peacock, 1970
- "Eastward" (song), by Lazarus, 1971; covered by the Lettermen, 1974
- Eastward (video game), a 2021 video game

== See also ==
- Eastward Hoe, an early Jacobean stage play
