= Henry Magill House =

Historic house in Connecticut, United States

- U.S. National Register of Historic Places
- U.S. Historic district – Contributing property
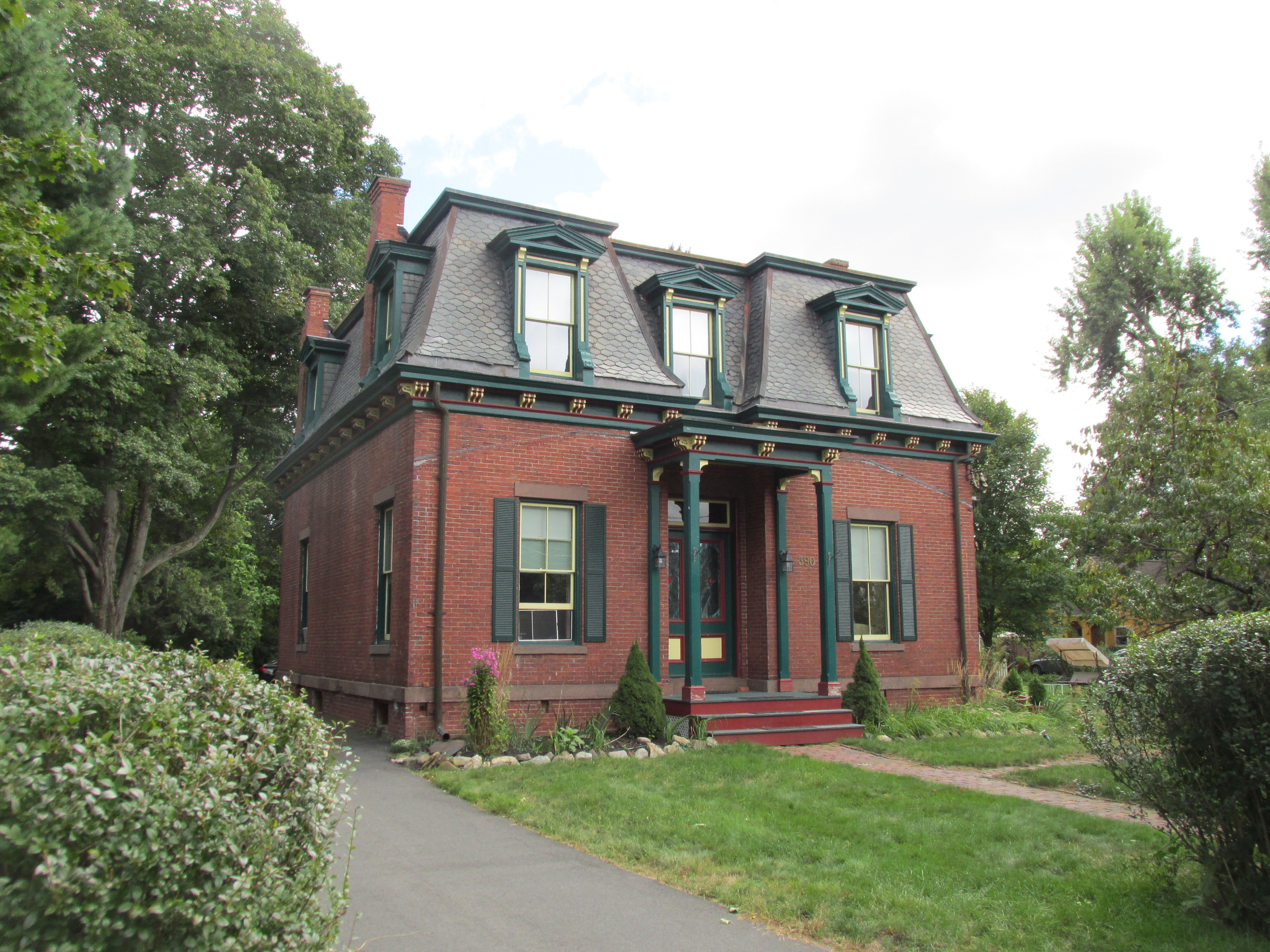

- Location within Connecticut Location within the United States
- Location: 390 Palisado Avenue, Windsor, Connecticut
- Coordinates: 41°51′57″N 72°37′48″W
- Area: 1.6 acres (0.65 ha)
- Built: 1861
- Architectural style: Second Empire
- Part of: Palisado Avenue Historic District (ID87000799)
- MPS: 18th and 19th Century Brick Architecture of Windsor TR
- NRHP reference No.: 88001491

Significant dates
- Added to NRHP: September 15, 1988
- Designated CP: August 25, 1987

The Henry Magill House is a historic house at 390 Palisado Avenue in Windsor, Connecticut. Built in 1861, it is a well-preserved and locally rare example of Second Empire architecture executed in brick. It was listed on the National Register of Historic Places in 1988.

== Description and history ==
The Henry Magill House is located north of Windsor center, on the east side of Palisado Avenue (Connecticut Route 159), near its junction with Kennedy Road. It is a 1 1/2-story brick building, with a mansard roof providing a full second floor in the attic level. Its street-facing facade is three bays wide, with a recessed central bay. Each bay has a dormer in the attic level, with narrow pilasters flanking a sash window, and supporting a bracketed fully pedimented gable. There are sash windows in the outer bays on the ground floor, with brownstone sills and lintels. The main entrance is in the center bay, sheltered by a single-story portico that has square posts rising to a low-pitch hip roof with bracketed cornice. The building has a brownstone water table separating the brick basement from main floor, and its roof also has a bracketed cornice. The south-facing facade has two polygonal bay windows, each topped by a bracketed cornice and hip roof.

The house was built in 1861 for Henry Magill, a farmer. It is fairly elaborate example of the Second Empire, which is a style not seen frequently in the town, and has retained many of its original features.

== See also ==
- National Register of Historic Places listings in Windsor, Connecticut
