= Lily Flagg =

1892 top butter-producing jersey cow

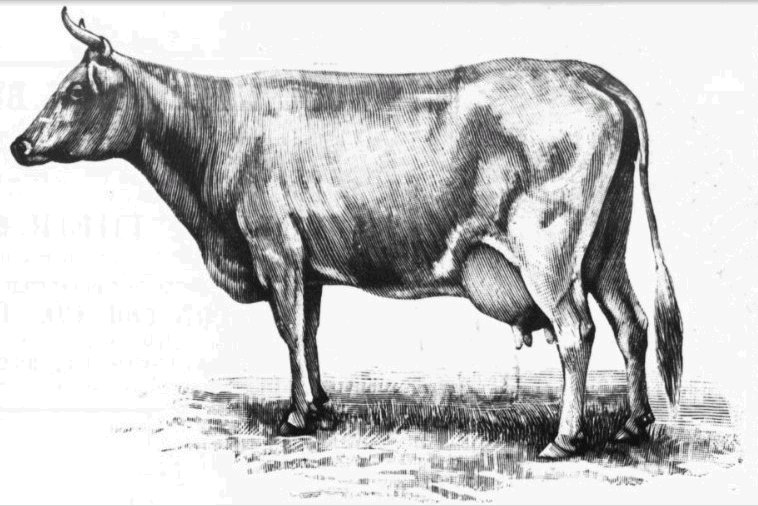
Lily Flagg was a Jersey cow

Signal's Lily Flagg 31035 (1884–?), also spelled Flag, was a Jersey cow, the top butter producer in the world in 1892, owned by W. E. Matthews and General Samuel H. Moore of Huntsville, Alabama. During her record-breaking year, she weighed 950 pounds (430 kg) and produced 1,047 pounds 3/4 ounce (474.93 kg) of butter. Her parents were sire Georgian 6073 and dam Little Nan 15895.

The Sydney Mail reported extensively on Lily Flagg:

Signal's Lily Flagg was bred in Kentucky, and while strictly thoroughbred and a registered cow, she does not belong to any of the fashionable families as the first part of her name would imply, as she is only one-twelfth Signal blood. The credit of her work belongs to the breed, and as Bison's Belle was of the same class this should greatly encourage testing the best cows to find the wonders. She was eight years old at the time of this test and weighed about 950lb. While perhaps not a model cow in appearance, yet she is of good form and, what is much better, of strong constitution, and she looks well enough to go through another year's trial. She has two tested daughters, one of 14lb a week and another of 20lb, thus showing that she possesses that greatest of all thoroughbred gifts, the power of transmitting her good qualities to her offspring, and as she has dropped eight calves (one pair of twins) the world is likely to be greatly benefited by the good work of Signal's Lily Flagg.

Two cows—Bisson's Belle and Signal's Lily Flagg—are on record as producing over half a ton [(453 kg)] of butter in a year. From this to the paltry 152 pounds [69 kg] which is the average of the common scrub beast is a long jump.

== The Jersey Champion Cup ==
The Pennsylvania Department of Agriculture annual report put Lily Flagg's butter production into historical perspective:

The development of the yearly butter record is of more than passing interest. In 1813, Mr. Caleb Oakes, of Danvers, Mass., purchased a cow then five years old, of unknown stock, that in 1814 made 300 pounds of butter, in 1815 over 400 pounds, and in 1816, between May 15 and December 20. 484 pounds 4 ounces of butter. The largest amount made in one week was 19 pounds. The Oakes cow became famous and was given the prize of the Massachusetts State Agricultural Society in 1816. For years the yield of the Oakes cow was unsurpassed, so far as the public is aware. Finally the Jersey cow Eurotas made a sensation and excelled all previous records, by producing 778 pounds 1 ounce of butter in a year. This set the Jersey world agog, and Mary Ann of St. Lambert went into a year's test to break the record of Eurotas, which she did by producing 867 pounds 14¾ ounces of butter in a year. Then a challenge cup was offered to the Jersey who would excel Mary Ann in the butter yield, and Landseer's Fancy took possession of this, after demonstrating that she could make 936 pounds 14¾ ounces of butter to Mary Ann's 867 pounds 14¾ ounces. But after this, Eurotissima made 945 pounds 9 ounces and took the cup; then Bisson's Belle relieved her of it by making 1,028 pounds 15 ounces, and finally, in 1892, Signal's Lily Flagg, by producing 1,047 pounds ¾ ounce of butter in a year, led this list of celebrated Jerseys. But for greatest total butter yield in a year, it is said that the Jersey is not the champion, for the Holstein-Friesian cow Pauline Paul, in 1890 and 1891, in 365 days, produced 18,669 pounds 9 ounces of milk under test, from which was made 1,153 pounds 15¾ ounces of butter, worked and salted, one ounce to the pound.

== Celebrations ==
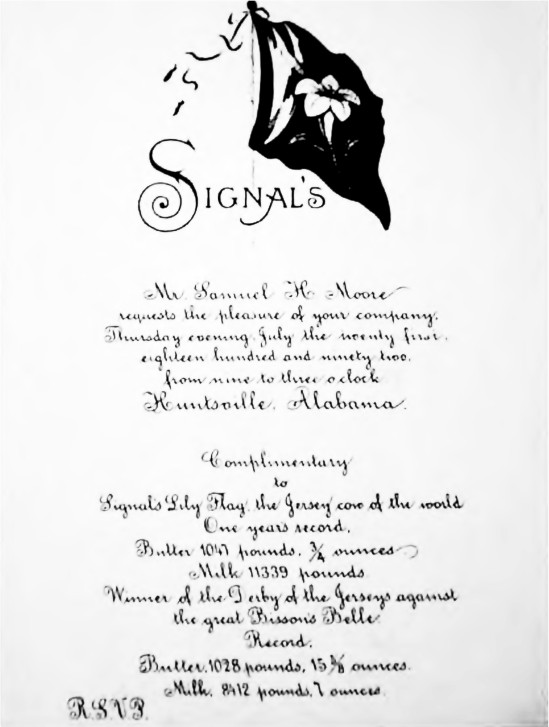
Invitations encouraged townsfolk to celebrate the cow's prodigious butter production.

To celebrate the record year of butter and present the Jersey champion cup, owners and testers were honored at a party for which the invitation read,

The citizens of Huntsville, Alabama, request the pleasure of your presence at a reception to be given at the Monte Sano Hotel, on Wednesday, June 29, at half-past 8 o'clock in honour of General S. H. Moore, W. E. Matthews, Esq., Captain Milton Humes, and Mr. L. C. Goddell.

This reception was an affair, to be sure. The Monte Sano Hotel was a modern establishment—having just been built in 1887—which hosted in its day such famous people as Helen Keller, the Vanderbilt family, and the Astor family.

The splendor was not contained on the mountain, but continued downtown three weeks later. Owner Samuel Moore was so taken by the world record that he threw an additional elaborate party on July 21, 1892. In preparation, he painted his home a butter yellow and erected a 50-foot dancing platform at his house, but even that was not enough. He arranged for some of the first electric lights in the Southeast to be installed to illuminate the party through the night. This party was a renowned affair inviting people from as far away as Baltimore and drawing recognition there.

== World's Columbian Exposition ==
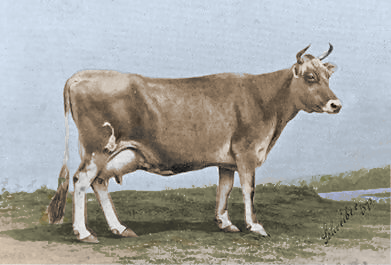
"Many people who visit the stock exhibits at the World's Fair inquire for the '$15,000 Jersey beauty,'"

Being an especially famous bovine on account of having won the Jersey champion cup, Lily Flagg was highly sought after for her calves, and for public appearances at top-notch events such as the World's Columbian Exposition, also known as the Chicago World's Fair. Her trip was delayed due to an injury until sometime after mid-June 1893, but she made her appearance to the delight of many a dairy man by October.

The Chicago Times reports:

Signal's Lily Flag lay on a pile of straw and chewed her cud just as calmly as if she were not the champion Jersey cow on the earth, and worth 15,000dol at that. A group of cow men stood looking awesomely upon her ladyship as she chewed, and talked with respectful voices about...Lily Flag's record. There was one coarse fellow from Missouri who wanted the Lily punched up so he could look at her legs. But Superintendent Davis gave him a look that went through him like the trenchant thin blade of a Columbian guard. And the Lily chewed and chewed.

The dairy cows at the fair were the most elite of the world. Says the History of the World's Fair:

They belong to the herdsman's 400. Every one of them is blue-blooded and has a pedigree in the herd books as long as a man's arm. Every one of them, as her name indicates, is somebody's darling. Every one of them has a body servant and is a farm pet. Every one of them is fed, curried, rubbed, and waited on in the most obsequious manner. In the case of some of them their keepers often lie down in the straw by their sides at night and sleep with them. Some of them have national or world-wide reputations.

Indeed, every accommodation was made for Lily Flagg and other cows that they may not be disturbed during their milking or the time while they are producing milk, writes the Chicago Times:

Twice a day each cow is respectfully milked, and some of the milkers wear creased trousers and diamonds. If a cow chances to be lying down when milking time comes, the milker politely takes off his cap and taps the high-priced creature gently until she chooses to rise. There are signs on the walls like these:—"Do not disturb the cows when lying down." "Do not talk to the milkers."

While at the fair in Jackson Park, Lily Flagg produced 29 lb 11 oz (13.5 kg) of butter in a seven-day test. In this effort she was bested only by Little Goldie's 34 lb 8 1/2 oz (15.66 kg) of butter, even among a field of top producers. For comparison, Lily Flagg's yearlong butter test averaged to 20 lb 1 1/4 oz (9.11 kg) per week.

Her competition record at the fair was deliberately brief. Because she was recognized as one of four "queens in Jersey history, ... Signal's Lily Flagg was barred from competition there as she was acknowledged to be unapproachable."

At the fair, Lily Flagg was sold to C. I. Hood of Lowell, Massachusetts for $1250 just before September 23, 1893. She joined his herd of prize-winning Jerseys on 1,200 acres (490 hectares). For price comparison, thirteen years later, Hood auctioned 59 dairy cows, many with calf, at prices ranging $40 to $525, averaging $186. These prices were probably still significantly higher than the average cow considering the fine stock at Hood Farm.

Lily Flagg did not play a significant role in Hood's breeding program after 1898. A 1906 auction catalog listed 59 cows, none of which included Lily in the pedigree.

== Legacy ==
External videos
- Shane Adkins wrote and here performs the song Three Cheers for Lily Flagg chronicling the famous cow, recorded in 2014.

Lily Flagg was raised on Monte Sano Dairy in Northeast Huntsville, AL by descendants of the Chapman family. Her barn was on Dairy Lane in the northeast quadrant of the city but she has long been remembered with Lily Flagg Village, south of Huntsville. 34.65489°N 86.56626°W The area was known for its cotton production and featured the Lily Flagg Gin. The community won a state prize of $2000 for its one-variety cotton program in 1948. With the Space Race-fueled local population boom in the 1950s and 1960s, the village was annexed into Huntsville. Many establishments, a collector road, neighborhood, and apartment complex in the area are named for the cow. The area swim team is the Lily Flagg Cows. Lily Flagg Milk Stout is brewed in Huntsville.

The Lily Flagg's Signal Huntsville history podcast, started in 2022, is named for the bovine. An early episode of the show addresses the story of the cow.

An eponymous book fictionalizes the account of the cow and the surrounding hoopla.
