= A.F. Norris =

American architect

A.F. Norris (1864-1915) was an American architect. He designed approximately 400 residences.

Several of his designs appear in Concrete Country Residences.

The 50 Lloyd Rd. was featured in Scientific American Building Edition.; his work at 10 Rockledge was featured in American Homes & Gardens.

A number of his works are listed on the U.S. National Register of Historic Places.

Works include:

- Casa Deldra, 35 Afterglow Way Montclair, NJ (Norris, A.F.), NRHP-listed
- J. M. Chapman House, 10 Rockledge Montclair, NJ (Norris, A.F.), NRHP-listed
- Eastward, 50 Lloyd Rd. Montclair, NJ (Norris, A.F.), NRHP-listed
- Egbert Farm, 128 N. Mountain Ave. Montclair, NJ (Norris, A.F.), NRHP-listed
- Villa Jolie, 105 Upper Mountain Ave. Montclair, NJ (Norris, A.F.), NRHP-listed
