= Egbert Farm =

Historic house in New Jersey, United States

- U.S. National Register of Historic Places
- New Jersey Register of Historic Places
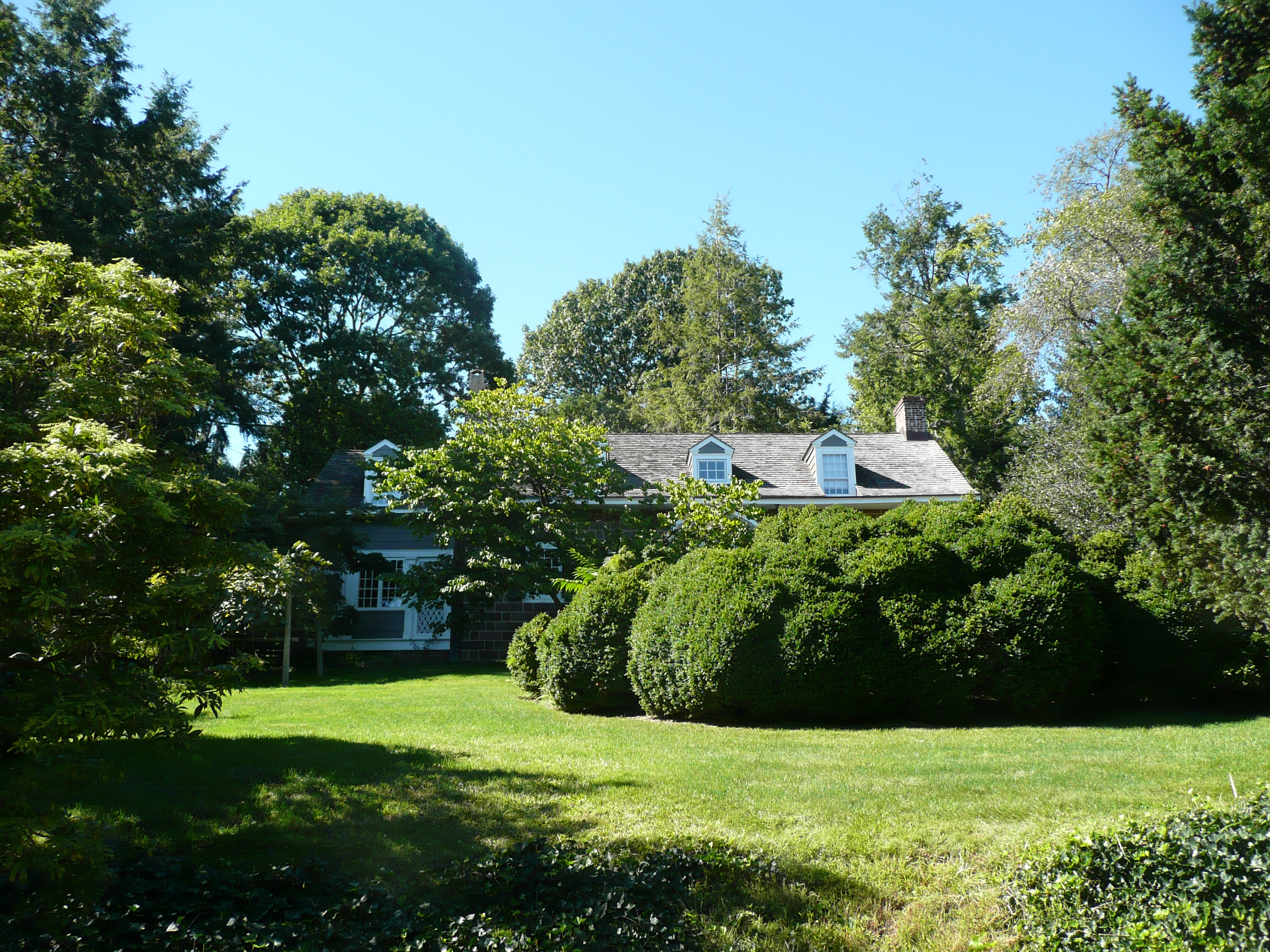

- Location within Essex County, New Jersey Location within New Jersey Location within the United States
- Location: 128 North Mountain Avenue, Montclair, New Jersey
- Coordinates: 40°49′39″N 74°13′8″W
- Area: less than one acre
- Built: 1793
- Architect: Norris, A.F.
- Architectural style: Colonial, Flemish Colonial
- MPS: Montclair MRA
- NRHP reference No.: 86002996
- NJRHP No.: 1123

Significant dates
- Added to NRHP: July 1, 1988
- Designated NJRHP: September 29, 1986

Egbert Farm, also known as Thomas House, is located in Montclair, Essex County, New Jersey, United States. The house was built in 1793. It was renovated or extended with architecture designed by A.F. Norris. It was added to the National Register of Historic Places on July 1, 1988.

== See also ==
- National Register of Historic Places listings in Essex County, New Jersey
