= Palisado Avenue Historic District =

- U.S. National Register of Historic Places
- U.S. Historic district
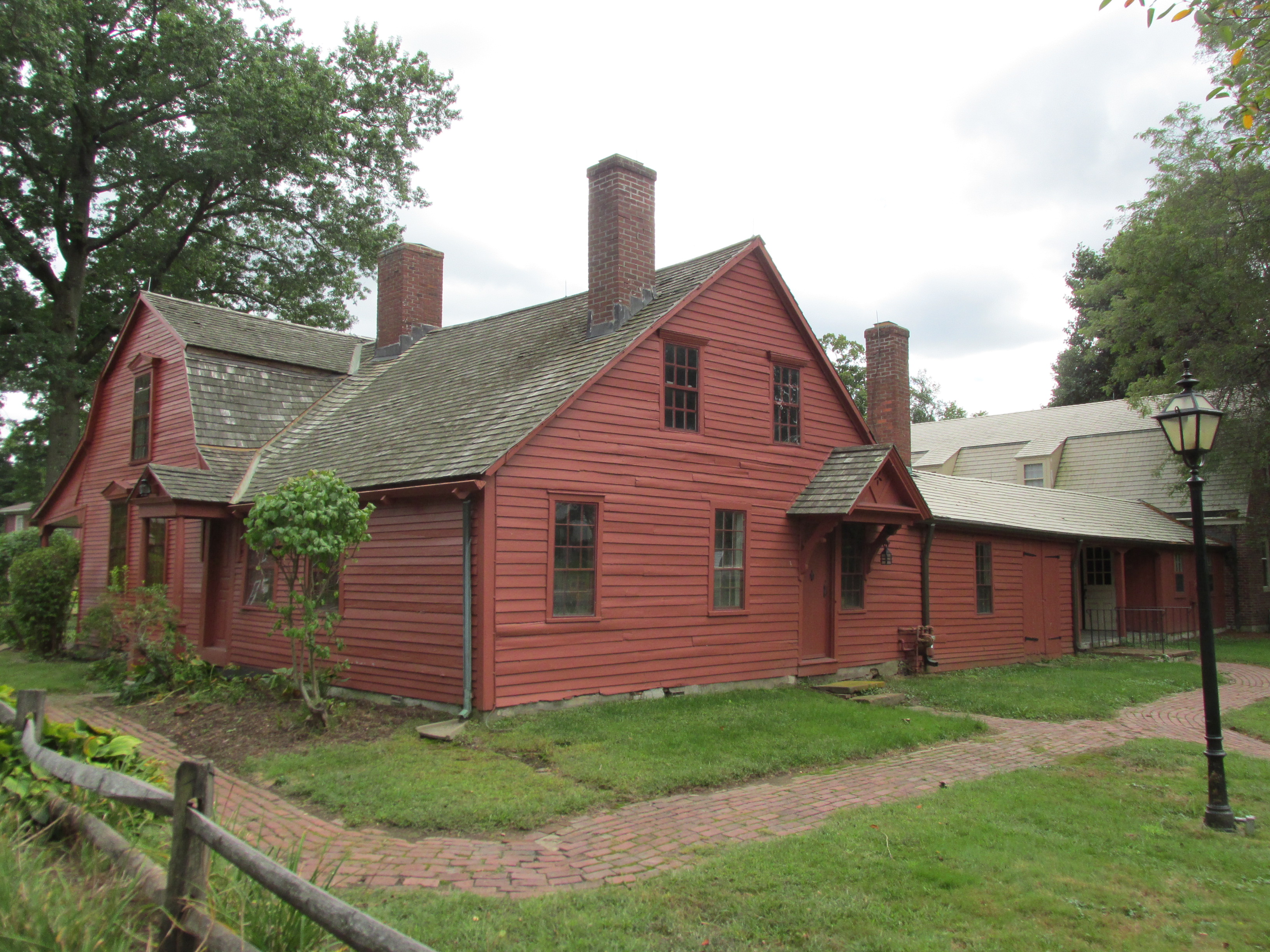
- Windsor Historical Society

- Location within Connecticut Location within the United States
- Location: Palisado Avenue between the Farmington River and Bissell Ferry Road, Windsor, Connecticut
- Coordinates: 41°51′35″N 72°38′10″W
- Area: 63 acres (25 ha)
- Built by: Berlin Construction Co.
- Architectural style: Colonial Revival, Italianate, Georgian
- NRHP reference No.: 87000799
- Added to NRHP: August 25, 1987

The Palisado Avenue Historic District encompasses a predominantly residential streetscape in northeastern Windsor, Connecticut. Extending along Palisado Avenue (Connecticut Route 159) between the Farmington River and Bissell Ferry Road, it is a basically 18th-century street view, populated mainly with houses from the 18th to the 20th centuries. The district was listed on the National Register of Historic Places in 1987.

== Description and history ==
Windsor was one of the first communities on the Connecticut River to be settled by English colonists. Its early center was established on the high ground overlooking the mouth of the Farmington River, where the Palisado Green is now located, with the town's first cemetery (now called the Palisado Cemetery) to its west. Extending north from this point is the Palisado Ridge, which overlooks the floodplains of the Connecticut River to the east. Palisado Avenue was laid out on this ridge, with house lots lining the road and agricultural lands to the east and west. The town's main commercial center moved south of the Farmington River in the 1750s, but the two areas remained united as a community by the construction of the first bridge across the Farmington in the late 18th century. The town's principal church was also relocated at that time to the Palisado Green; built in 1794, it is a fine example of Federal architecture with later Greek Revival additions.

The streetscape of Palisado Avenue beyond the area of the green is basically residential, with houses widely spaced and set well back from the road. There are a number of instances of Windsor's varied brick houses, including the Italianate Patrick Murphy House and Georgian Taylor Chapman House, but most of the buildings are two-story frame buildings. Stylistically they are dominated by Georgian, Federal, and Colonial Revival styles, giving the area a distinctly 18th or early 19th-century flavor. There a modest number of different Victorian styles, including the Second Empire Henry Magill House, and there are only a few examples of early 20th-century styles.

== See also ==
- National Register of Historic Places listings in Windsor, Connecticut
