= Rancho Pastoría de las Borregas =

Mexican land grant in California

Coordinates: 37.380°N 122.010°W

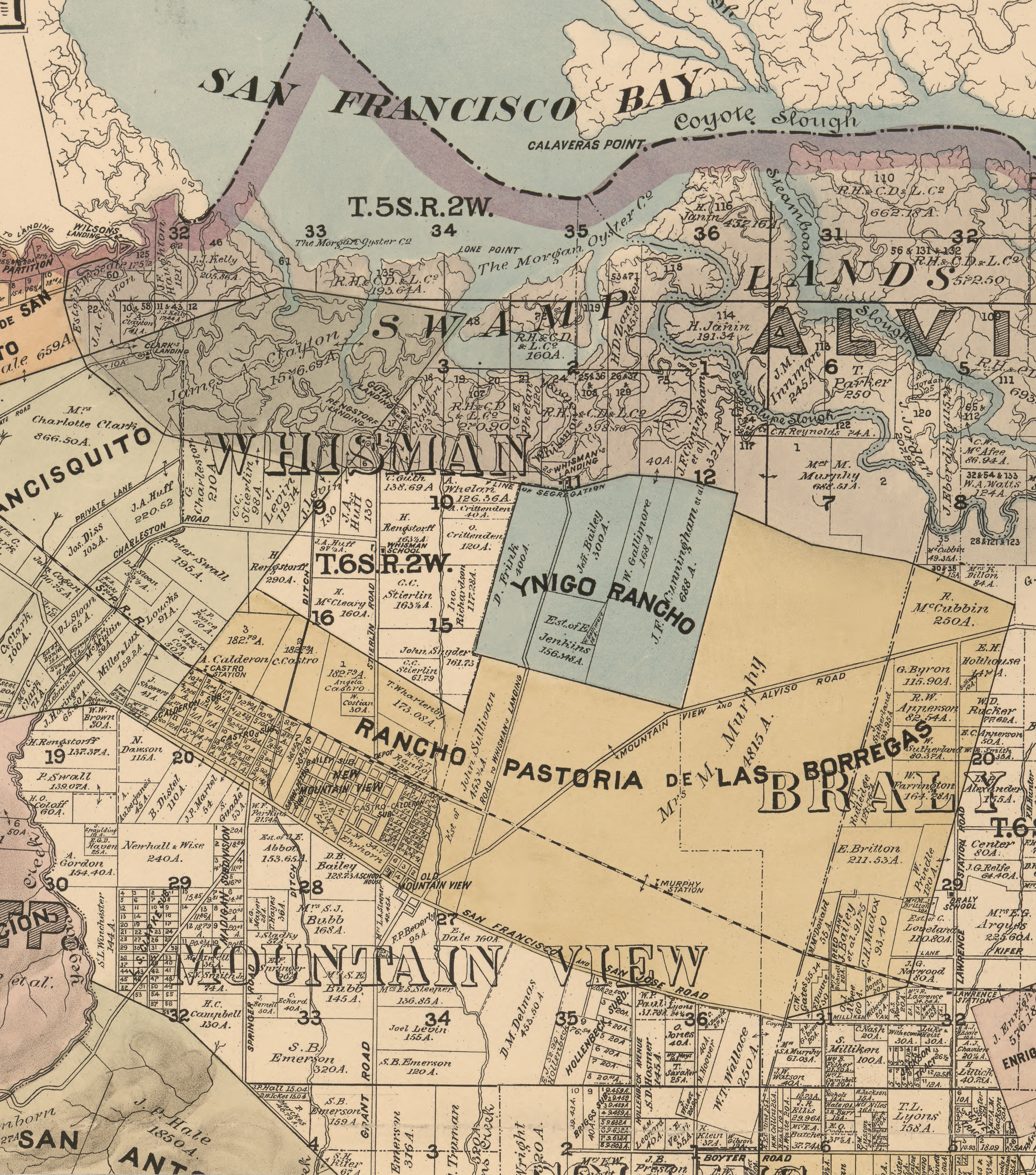
1890 map showing the extent of Rancho Pastoría de las Borregas

Rancho Pastoría de las Borregas was a 9,066-acre (36.69 km^{2}) Mexican land grant in present day Santa Clara County, California, United States, given in 1842 by Governor Juan Alvarado to Francisco Estrada. The name means "Ranch of the Ewe/Lamb Pasture" in Spanish. The rancho lands encompassed the present day cities of Sunnyvale and Mountain View.

== History ==
Francisco M. Estrada received the land grant in 1842. Estrada's wife Inez Castro Estrada died in 1844 and Estrada died in 1845. His father, Jose Mariano Estrada, inherited the land and transferred it to Inez Castro Estrada's father, Mariano Castro (1784–1857). He was born in San Francisco and served in the Spanish army. He was made Alcalde of the San Jose Pueblo.

In 1849, Mariano Castro sold half the rancho to Martin Murphy, Jr., (1807–1884), the son of Martin Murphy Sr., who brought his family to California with the Stephens-Townsend-Murphy Party in 1844.

With the cession of California to the United States following the Mexican–American War, the 1848 Treaty of Guadalupe Hidalgo provided that the land grants would be honored. As required by the Land Act of 1851, a claim for Rancho Pastoría de las Borregas was filed by Mariano Castro with the Public Land Commission in 1852, and the grant was patented for 4,172 acres (16.9 km^{2})in 1881.

A claim was filed by Murphy, Jr. with the Land Commission in 1852, and the grant was patented for 4,894 acres (19.8 km^{2}) in 1865.

Murphy, Jr. died in 1884, and his wife, Mary Bolger Murphy, died in 1892. Their rancho was divided among their children; each received 820 acres (3.3 km^{2}).

== Historic sites of the Rancho ==
- Sunnyvale Heritage Park Museum

== Bibliography ==
- Ignoffo, Mary Jo (1994). Sunnyvale: From the City of Destiny to the Heart of the Silicon Valley. California History Center & Foundation. ISBN 0-935089-17-9.
- Ignoffo, Mary Jo (2002). Milestones: A History of Mountain View, California. California History Center & Foundation. ISBN 0-935089-28-4.
- Perry, Nicholas (2006). Mountain View. Arcadia Publishing. ISBN 978-0-7385-3136-6.
- 100th Birthday City of Mountain View
