= William P. Murphy Jr. =

American physician and inventor (1923–2023)

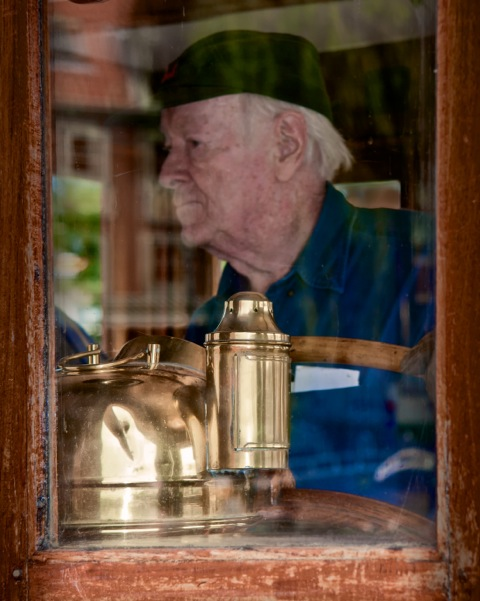
- Murphy on his 100 ton steam ship, 2013
- Born: William Parry Murphy Jr. November 11, 1923; Boston, Massachusetts, U.S.
- Died: November 30, 2023 (aged 100); Coral Gables, Florida, U.S.
- Occupations: Doctor; inventor; executive
- Spouses: Barbara Eastham (m. 1943, divorced); Beverly Patterson (m. 1973)
- Children: 3
- Parent(s): William Parry Murphy; Harriett Adams

William Parry Murphy Jr. (November 11, 1923 – November 30, 2023) was an American physician and inventor of medical devices including collaborating on a flexible sealed blood bag used for blood transfusions. He was the son of the American physician William Parry Murphy who shared the Nobel Prize in Physiology for Medicine in 1934, and Harriett Adams, the first licensed female dentist in Massachusetts.

== Background ==
William Parry Murphy Jr. was born in Boston on November 11, 1923, the son of hematologist William Parry Murphy and Harriet (née Adams) Murphy, the first woman to become a licensed dentist in Massachusetts. Murphy grew up in Brookline, Massachusetts. He graduated from Harvard University in 1946 with a major in pre-medicine and a minor in architecture. He received his M.D. in 1947 from the University of Illinois and also studied physiologic instrumentation at the Massachusetts Institute of Technology from 1947 to 1948.

=== Personal life ===
Murphy married Barbara Eastham in 1943; they had three daughters and divorced in the early 1970s. In 1973, he married Beverly Patterson.

Murphy turned 100 on November 11, 2023, and died 19 days later, on November 30, at his home in Coral Gables, Florida.

== Career ==
Murphy was the chairman of the board of directors at U.S. Stem Cell, formerly Bioheart. He retired in 2022.

=== U.S. Patents ===
Murphy holds 17 U.S. patents issued between 1952 and 1980.

Patent #	Year Issued	Description
2,596,819	1952	Change Speed Apparatus
2,649,299	1953	Spring Scale
2,876,496	1959	Process for Making Tubes
3,013,656	1961	Disposable Medical Trays
3,033,038	1962	Surgical Manometer
3,048,192	1962	Surgical Valve
3,101,085	1963	Alternating Tourniquet System
3,105,511	1963	Infusion Safety Valve
3,152,202	1964	Tapered End Plastic Tube
3,122,136	1964	Catheter Pressure Standard
3,140,714	1964	Blood Separation Method*
3,246,646	1966	Pivoted Vaginal Speculum
3,253,595	1966	Cardiac Pacer Electrode System**
3,625,201	1971	Tester for Standby Pacing
3,620,220	1971	Cardiac Pacer with Redundant Power Supply
4,211,597	1980	Method for Making Artificial Kidney***
4,231,871	1980	Artificial Kidney & Method for Making Same***

* Walter B. Dandliker, PhD Coinventor

** J. Walter Keller Coinventor

*** BJ. Lipps Coinventor

== Publications ==
He co-authored nearly 30 medical publications and helped to establish several professional organizations such as FIRST (For Inspiration and Recognition of Science and Technology), a non-profit group dedicated to inspiring young people's interest in science, technology and engineering, founded by his friend Dean Kamen.

Publication Title	Authors	Publication / Publisher	Date
"Portable Projector for Roentgenograms"	Dillion and Murphy	Am. J. of Roent. & Ray., Vol. LXI #6	June 1949
"Sterile Lancets for Blood Sampling"	Walter, Murphy, and Comploier	J. of A.M.A., 148	March 1952
"A Closed Gravity Technique for the Preservation of Whole Blood in ACD Solution"	Utilizing Plastic Equipment	Walter and Murphy S.G.&O., #94	June 1952.
"The Retardation of Clotting of Whole Blood on Contact with Stainless Steel"	Walter, Murphy, Jessiman, and Ahara	Surgical Forum	1952
"Use of an Artificial Kidney"	Murphy, Swan, Walter, Weller and Merrill	J. Lab. & CI. Med., 4D #3	September 1952
"Report of Blood Study Team Activities in the Far East”	Sproul, Murphy, Warrens and Sack		June 19 to July 30, 1953
"Serum Hepatitis from Pooled Irradiated Dried Plasma"	Murphy and Workman	J. of A.M.A., #154	August 1953
"Hemolysis in Blood Collected for Plasma processing"	Murphy, Sprout and Cetz	J.ofA.M.A.,#6	Junel955
"The Mechanical Factors Responsible for Rapid Infusion of Blood"	Walter, Murphy and Bellamy	S.G. &0.,#1	July 1955
"The Influence of Extracellular Factors Involved in the Collection of Blood in ACD on Maintenance of Red Cell Viability During Refrigerated Storage"	Gibson, Murphy, Scheitlin and Rees	Am. J. of CI. Path, #8	August 1956
"Direct Stimulation Myography and Ergometry of Human Calf Muscles with Supplementary Observations on Calf Elasticity,"	Edwards and Murphy	Surgery, Gynecology & Obstetrics	December 1956
"Unitized Disposable Urethral Catheter and Specimen Container"	Murphy, Flanery and Smith	J. of A.M.A., #15	December 1956
"A Blood Volume Expander Rediscovered"	Murphy	Bulletin of American Association of Blood Banks #2	February 1957
"Transfusion Consultation, Its Importance in Blood Banking"	Murphy	Bulletin of American Association of Blood Banks Vol. 10, No. 11	November 1957
"Atrial, Ventricular and Conal Myograms of the Embryonic Chick Heart"	Paff, Boucek and Murphy	The Anatomical Record	January 1959
"Electrocardiographic and Myographic Responses to Injury in the Isolated Chick Embryo Heart"	Boucek, Murphy and Paff	University of Miami	March 1959
"An Evaluation of Intermittent Peritoneal Lavage"	Doolan and Murphy	American Journal of Medicine	June 1959
"Thermo-Plastics in Patient Care Devices"	Murphy	Hospital Topics	July 1959
"Electrical and Mechanical Properties of the Chick Embryo Heart"	Boucek, Murphy and Paff	Circulation Research, Vol. VII	September 1959
"Recording of the Mechanical and Electrical Functions of the Chick Embryo Heart"	Murphy, Boucek and Paff	Medical Electronics	June 1959
"Electromagnetophoresis of Erythrocytes"	Dandliker, Murphy and Keller	Federation Proceedings, Vol. 19, No. 1, Pt. 1	March 1960
"Segmental Perfusion of Coronary Arteries with Fibrinolysin in Man Following Myocardial Infarction"	Boucek and Murphy	Am. J. Cardiology	August 1960
"A Sterile, Disposable Catheterization Tray"	Murphy	Hospital Topics	February 1961
"Intercalative Angiography"	Boucek, Murphy and Hernandez	Radiology Vol. 76, No. 4	April 1961
"The Cardiac Programmer to Trigger an Arterial Pump"	Murphy	Transcript American Society of Artificial Internal Organs, Vol. VII	1961
"Magnetoelectrophoresis"	Murphy, Dandliker and Keller	Transfusion, Vol. 1, No. 6	November–December 1961
"Preparing Plastic Implant Devices"	Murphy	Hospital Topics	October 1971
"Carl Walter: A Pioneer in Shaping the Medical Device Industry"	Murphy	The American Journal of Surgery	November 1984
