= Casa Deldra =

Historic house in New Jersey, United States

- U.S. National Register of Historic Places
- New Jersey Register of Historic Places
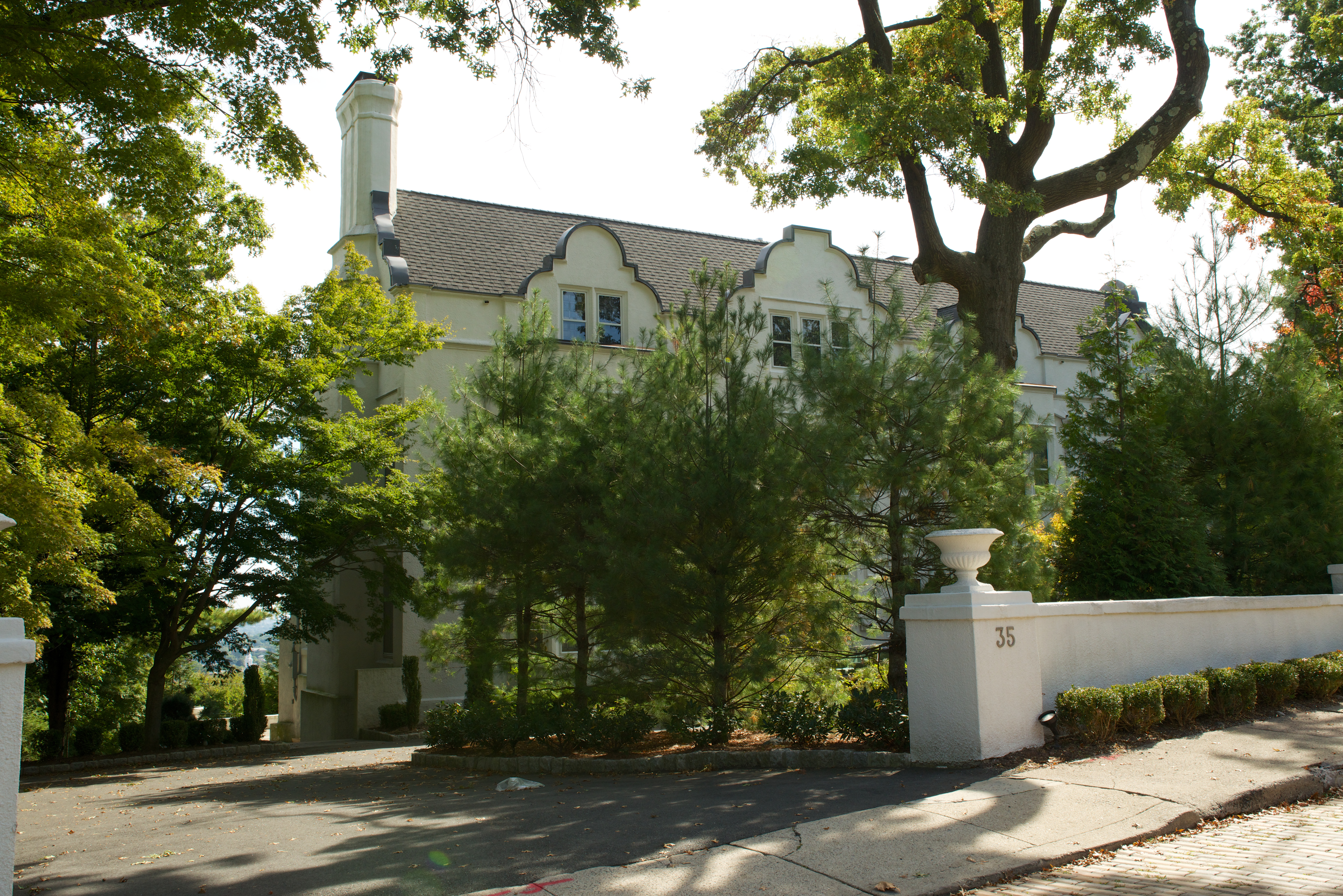

- Location within Essex County, New Jersey Location within New Jersey Location within the United States
- Location: 35 Afterglow Way, Montclair, New Jersey
- Coordinates: 40°49′18″N 74°13′42″W
- Built: 1912
- Architect: A.F. Norris
- Architectural style: Elizabethan Manor House
- MPS: Montclair MRA
- NRHP reference No.: 86003062
- NJRHP No.: 1107

Significant dates
- Added to NRHP: July 1, 1988
- Designated NJRHP: September 29, 1986

Casa Deldra, also known as the Anderson House, is located at 35 Afterglow Way in the township of Montclair in Essex County, New Jersey, United States. The house was designed by architect A.F. Norris and was built in 1912. It was added to the National Register of Historic Places on July 1, 1988, for its significance in architecture. It was listed in the Montclair Architects section of the Historic Resources of Montclair Multiple Property Submission (MPS).

== See also ==
- National Register of Historic Places listings in Essex County, New Jersey
