= Taylor Chapman House =

Historic house in Connecticut, United States

- U.S. National Register of Historic Places
- U.S. Historic district – Contributing property
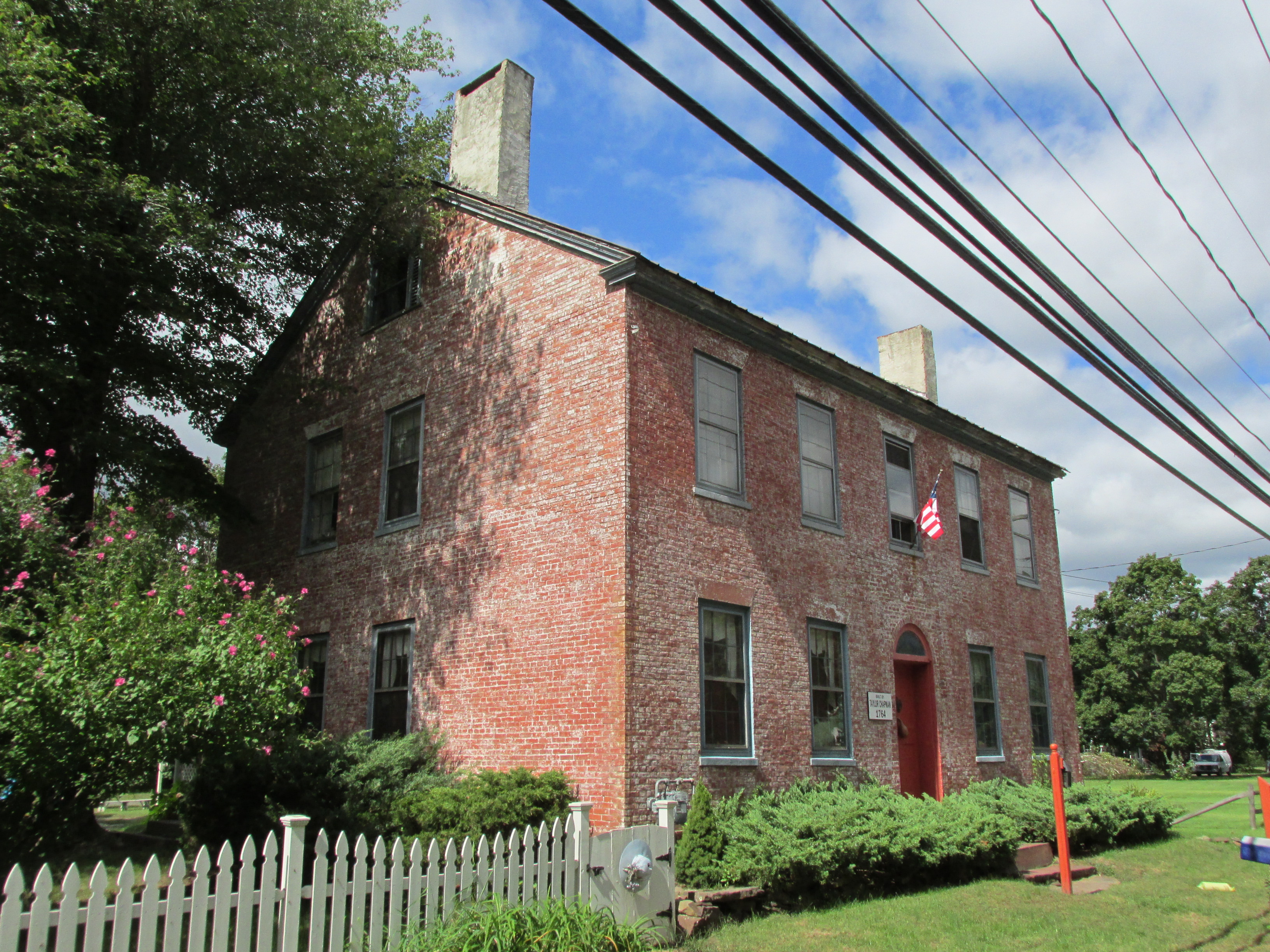

- Location within Connecticut Location within the United States
- Location: 407 Palisado Avenue, Windsor, Connecticut
- Coordinates: 41°51′59″N 72°37′49″W
- Area: 0.7 acres (0.28 ha)
- Built: 1764
- Architectural style: Georgian
- Part of: Palisado Avenue Historic District (ID87000799)
- MPS: 18th and 19th Century Brick Architecture of Windsor TR
- NRHP reference No.: 88001492

Significant dates
- Added to NRHP: September 15, 1988
- Designated CP: August 25, 1987

The Taylor Chapman House is a historic house at 407 Palisado Avenue in Windsor, Connecticut. Built in 1764, it is a well-preserved example of Georgian architecture executed in brick. It was listed on the National Register of Historic Places in 1988.

== Description and history ==
The Taylor Chapman House is located north of Windsor's village center, on the west side of Palisado Avenue (Connecticut Route 159) at the northwest of its junction with Kennedy Road. Palisado Avenue is a historically old road that was once the main road paralleling the west bank of the Connecticut River. It is a 2 1/2-story building, about 40 by 39 feet (12 m × 12 m). It is built out of brick, with a side gable roof and end chimneys, and rests on a stone foundation. It originally had two chimneys on each end wall, but now each has only one. The main facade is five bays across, with a center entrance topped by a half-round transom window. Windows are set in rectangular openings, with stone sills and lintels of soldier bricks. A single-story ell extends to the rear, and the property includes a 20th-century garage.

The house was built in 1764 by Taylor Chapman, and is one of a small number of surviving Georgian brick houses in Windsor. It is located near the road that lead to the historic Bissell Ferry crossing, which connected Windsor with East Windsor Hill.

== See also ==
- National Register of Historic Places listings in Windsor, Connecticut
