= Chapman Farmhouse =

Historic house in New York, United States

- U.S. National Register of Historic Places
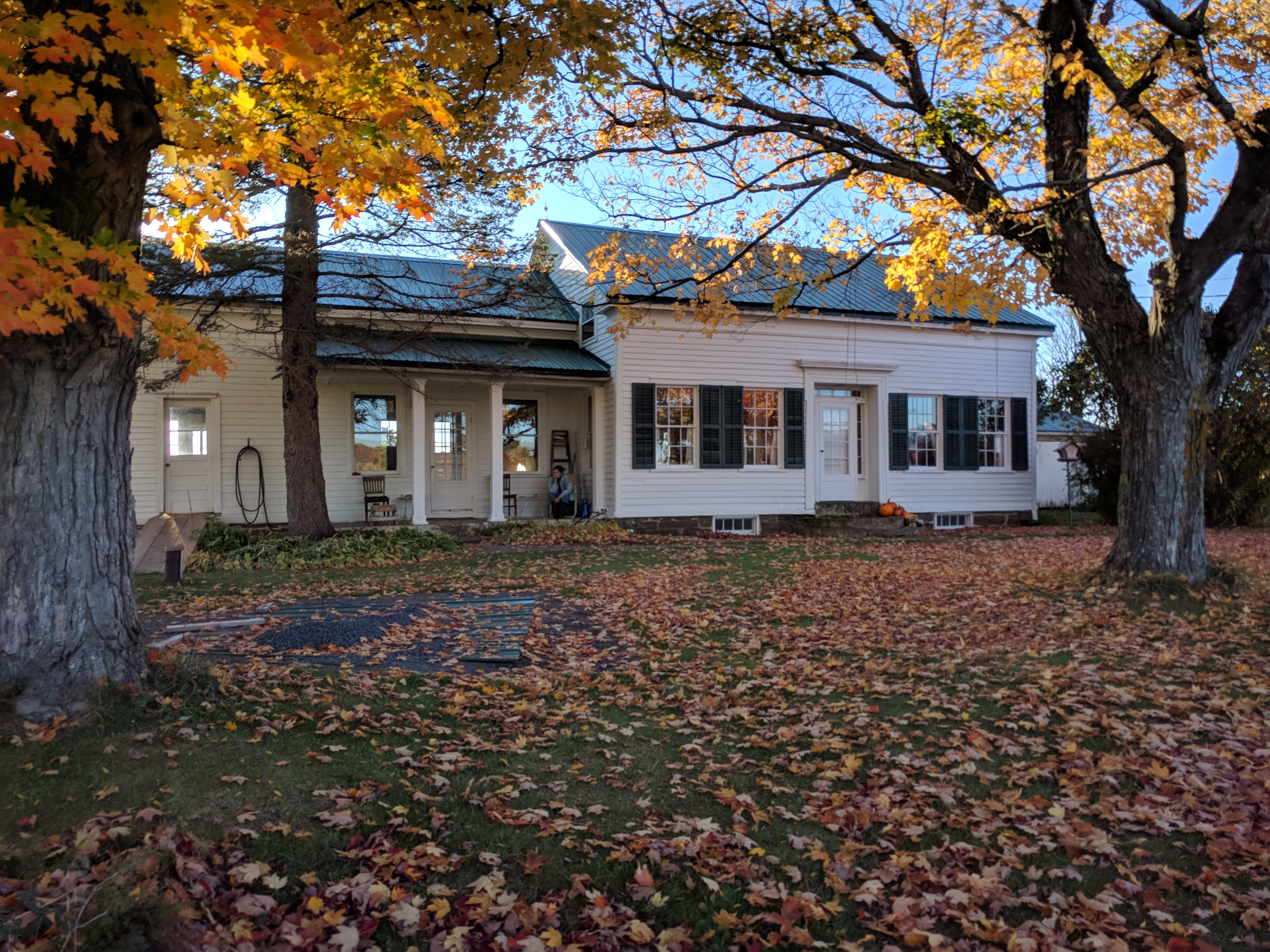

- Location within New York Location within the United States
- Location: Miller's Corners Rd. Duanesburg, New York
- Coordinates: 42°48′44″N 74°13′16″W
- Area: 131.8 acres (53.3 ha)
- Built: c. 1832
- Architectural style: Greek Revival; Federal
- MPS: Duanesburg MRA
- NRHP reference No.: 84003176
- Added to NRHP: October 11, 1984

Chapman Farmhouse is a historic home located at Duanesburg in Schenectady County, New York. It was built about 1832 and is a 1 1/2-story, five-bay frame building on a slightly raised stone foundation in a late-Federal / early-Greek Revival style. It features a gable roof with cornice returns, a wide frieze, narrow corner boards, and clapboard siding. Also on the property is a contributing barn.

The property was covered in a 1984 study of Duanesburg historical resources. It was listed on the National Register of Historic Places in 1984.
