= William P. Murphy =

American recipient of the Nobel Prize in Physiology or Medicine

William P. Murphy Sr.
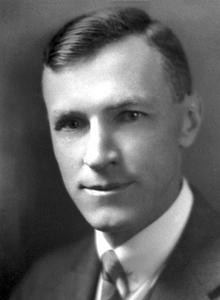
- Born: William Parry Murphy; February 6, 1892; Stoughton, Wisconsin, U.S.
- Died: October 9, 1987 (aged 95); Brookline, Massachusetts, U.S.
- Education: University of Oregon; Harvard Medical School
- Occupations: Academic, researcher, physician
- Spouse: Harriett Adams (m. 1919; died 1980)
- Children: 2; including William Jr.
- Awards: Cameron Prize for Therapeutics of the University of Edinburgh (1930); Nobel Prize in Physiology or Medicine (1934)

William Parry Murphy Sr. (February 6, 1892 – October 9, 1987) was an American physician who shared the Nobel Prize in Physiology or Medicine in 1934 with George Richards Minot and George Hoyt Whipple for their combined work in devising and treating macrocytic anemia (specifically, pernicious anemia).

== Early life ==
Murphy was born on February 6, 1892, at Stoughton, Wisconsin and moved to Condon, Oregon as a youth. His father, Thomas Francis Murphy, was a congregational minister of English and Irish heritage. His mother, Rosa Anna Parry, was of a Welsh landowning background. Murphy was educated at the public schools of Wisconsin and Oregon. He completed his A.B. degree in 1914 from the University of Oregon. He completed his M.D. in 1922 from Harvard Medical School.

== Career ==
Murphy's later work in pernicious anemia would build on that of Whipple. In 1924, Whipple bled dogs to make them anemic (work inspired by war injury work), and then fed them various substances to gauge their improvement. He discovered that ingesting large amounts of liver seemed to restore anemia more quickly of all foods. Minot and Whipple then set about to chemically isolate the curative substance. These investigations showed that iron in the liver was responsible for curing anemia from bleeding, but meanwhile liver had been tried on people with pernicious anemia and some effect was seen there, also. The active ingredient in this case, found serendipitously, was not iron, but rather a water-soluble extract containing a new substance. From this extract, chemists were ultimately able to isolate vitamin B_{12} from the liver. Even before the vitamin had been completely characterized, the knowledge that raw liver and its extracts treated pernicious anemia (previously a terminal disease) was a major advance in medicine. Minot and Murphy's famous paper Treatment of pernicious anemia by a special diet was published in 1926.

In 1930, Murphy was awarded the Cameron Prize for Therapeutics of the University of Edinburgh with George Minot.

In 1951, Murphy was one of seven Nobel Laureates who attended the 1st Lindau Nobel Laureate Meeting.

== Personal life ==
Murphy married Pearl Harriett Adams (died 1980) on September 10, 1919. They had a son, William P. Murphy Jr., and a daughter, Priscilla Adams.

Murphy died on October 9, 1987 in Brookline, Massachusetts at the age of 95.
