= Eastward (Montclair, New Jersey) =

Historic house in New Jersey, United States

- U.S. National Register of Historic Places
- New Jersey Register of Historic Places
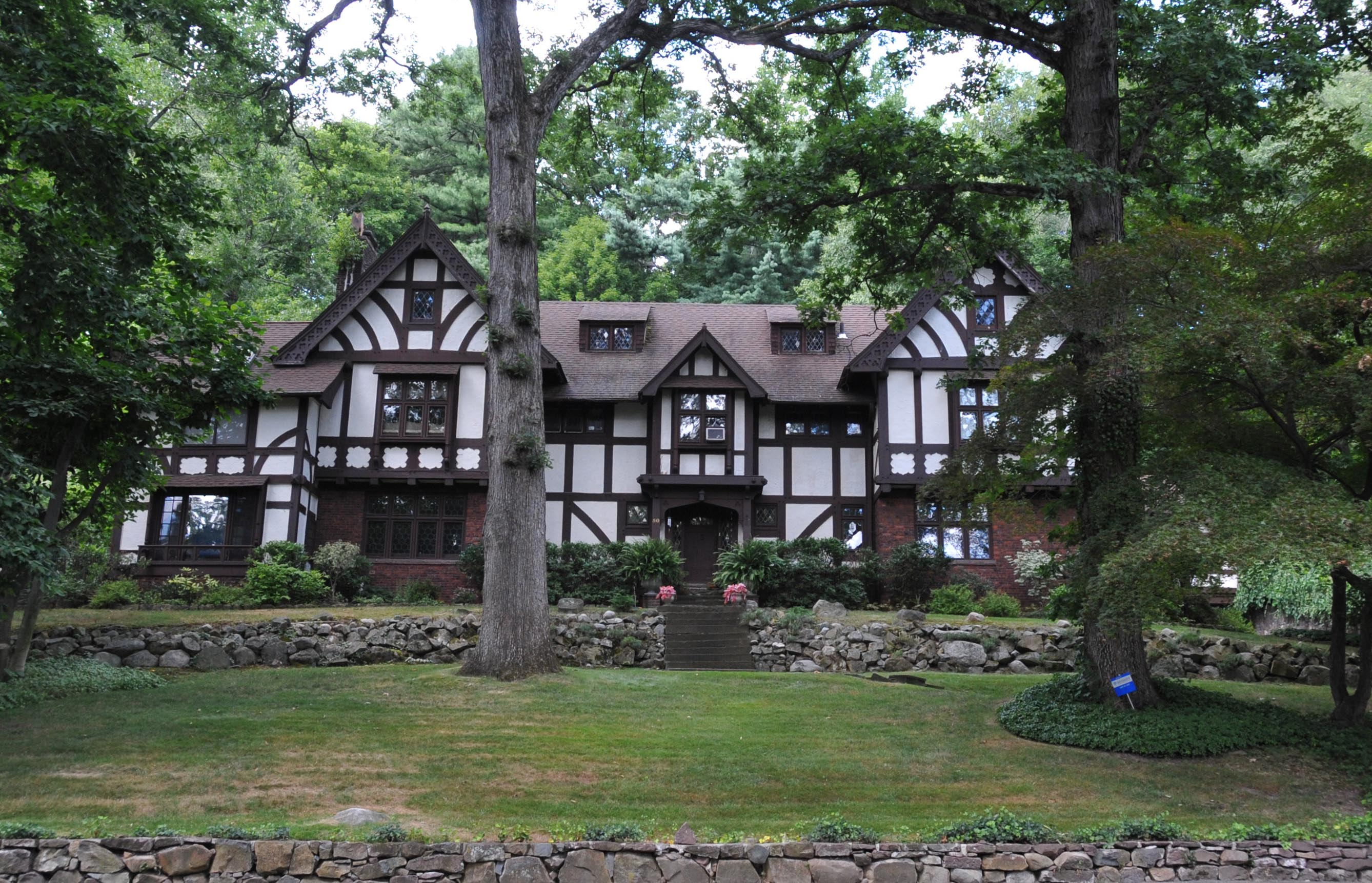

- Location within Essex County, New Jersey Location within New Jersey Location within the United States
- Location: 50 Lloyd Road, Montclair, New Jersey
- Coordinates: 40°49′7″N 74°13′45″W
- Area: 1 acre (0.40 ha)
- Built: 1902
- Architect: A.F. Norris
- Architectural style: Tudor Revival, Elizabethan manor house
- MPS: Montclair MRA
- NRHP reference No.: 86002980
- NJRHP No.: 1122

Significant dates
- Added to NRHP: July 1, 1988
- Designated NJRHP: September 29, 1986

Eastward is a historic house located at 50 Lloyd Road in the township of Montclair in Essex County, New Jersey, United States. The house was built in 1902 for Charles R. Coffin and was added to the National Register of Historic Places on July 1, 1988, for its significance in architecture. It was listed in the Selection of Montclair's Published Houses section of the Historic Resources of Montclair Multiple Property Submission (MPS).

It was designed by architect A.F. Norris and features Tudor Revival architecture. The house was featured in the Scientific American building edition in 1902.

== See also ==
- National Register of Historic Places listings in Essex County, New Jersey
