= George R. Minot House =

Historic house in Massachusetts, United States

- U.S. National Register of Historic Places
- U.S. National Historic Landmark
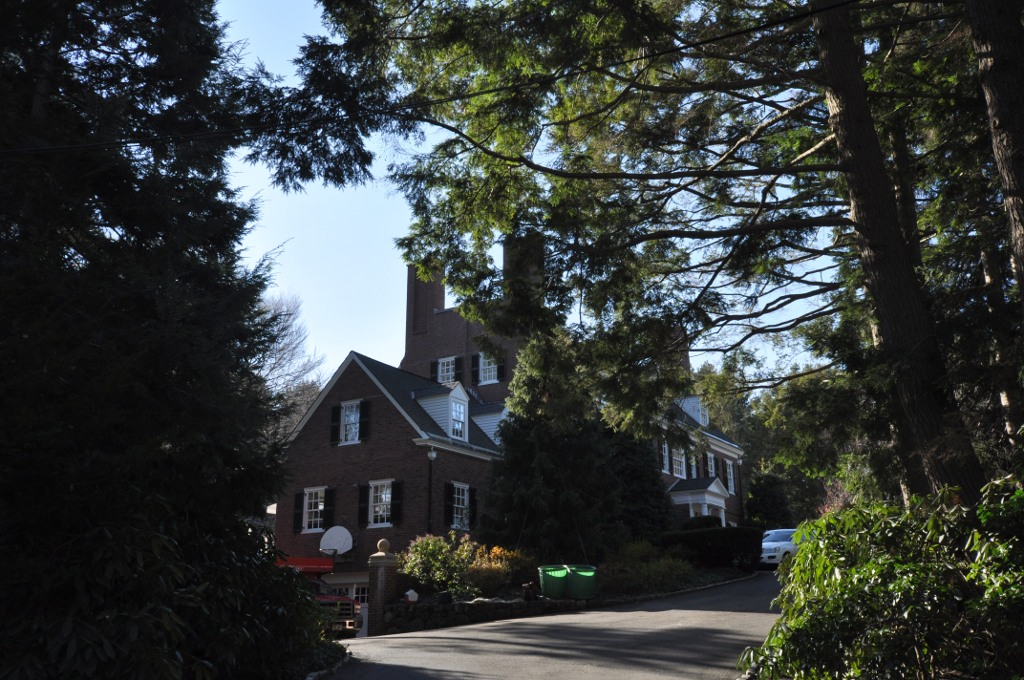
- George R. Minot House in 2012

- Location within Massachusetts
- Location: 71 Sears Road, Brookline, Massachusetts
- Coordinates: 42°19′3″N 71°8′21″W
- Built: 1929
- Architectural style: Colonial Revival
- NRHP reference No.: 76001976

Significant dates
- Added to NRHP: January 7, 1976
- Designated NHL: January 7, 1976

The George R. Minot House is a National Historic Landmark in Brookline, Massachusetts. It is an architecturally undistinguished vernacular Colonial Revival brick house, probably built in the 1920s. The 2 1/2-story main block has an attached 1 1/2-story ell, and two end chimneys. The hip roof is pierced by gabled dormers, and a pedimented portico shelters the front entry.

== History ==
The house is significant as the home of Dr. George R. Minot (1885–1950), who was awarded the Nobel Prize in Physiology or Medicine in 1934 for discovering a cure for pernicious anemia. Minot had a long history of interest in anemia, and performed his groundbreaking research while chief of medical services at Boston's Collis Huntington Memorial Hospital in the 1920s. He continued research on blood-related diseases at the Thorndike Memorial Laboratory of Boston City Hospital until his retirement in 1948. He died in 1950 from complications associated with diabetes mellitus, which afflicted him in 1921 and might have killed him soon thereafter, had insulin not been discovered the following year. Minot was also a full professor at Harvard Medical School, and was the first American to receive the Moxon Medal from the Royal College of Physicians. Some of his students went on to continue research in blood-related diseases based on his research methods, and the American Medical Association established a lecture series in his honor.

It was designated a National Historic Landmark and listed on the National Register of Historic Places on January 7, 1976.

== See also ==
- List of National Historic Landmarks in Massachusetts
- National Register of Historic Places listings in Brookline, Massachusetts
