= George Minot =

American medical researcher

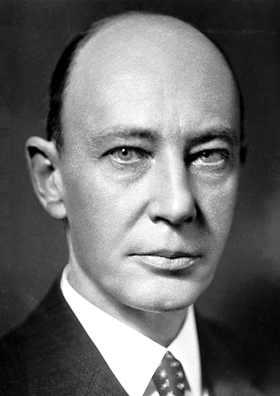
- Born: December 2, 1885; Boston, Massachusetts, U.S.
- Died: February 25, 1950 (aged 64); Brookline, Massachusetts, U.S.
- Education: Harvard University (BA, MD)
- Known for: Anemia; Treatment of pernicious anemia
- Awards: George M. Kober Medal (1929); Cameron Prize for Therapeutics of the University of Edinburgh (1930); Nobel Prize in Physiology or Medicine (1934)
- Scientific career
- Workplaces: Johns Hopkins School of Medicine

George Richards Minot (/ˈmaɪnɒt/ MY-not; December 2, 1885 – February 25, 1950) was an American medical researcher who shared the 1934 Nobel Prize in Physiology or Medicine with George Hoyt Whipple and William P. Murphy for their pioneering work on pernicious anemia.

== Early life ==
George Richards Minot was born in Boston, Massachusetts to James Jackson Minot (1853–1938) and Elizabeth Whitney. He was namesake of his great-great-grandfather George Richards Minot (1758–1802). His father was a physician; his father's cousin was anatomist Charles Sedgwick Minot (1852–1914); one of his great-grandfathers was James Jackson (1777–1867), co-founder of Massachusetts General Hospital. He developed interest, first, in the natural sciences, and then, in medicine.

== Education ==
Minot obtained his B.A. from Harvard College in 1908, where he was elected to The Owl Club, and obtained his M.D. degree in 1912 from the Harvard Medical School. Between 1913 and 1915, he worked in the William Henry Howell's lab at Johns Hopkins School of Medicine, studying blood thinning proteins, such as antithrombin. In 1915, he secured a junior position on the medical staff of the Massachusetts General Hospital, where he started research on blood anemia. During the first world war, he served as a surgeon in for the US Army. As part of those duties, he worked with Alice Hamilton to understand what was causing workers at a munitions plant in New Jersey to become ill. They eventually discovered that skin contact with TNT led to the sicknesses.

== Career ==
In 1917, he came to Collis P. Huntington Memorial Hospital in Boston; he became chief of medical services in 1923, and was appointed physician-in-chief in 1934. In addition, Minot became professor of medicine at the Harvard University, and was appointed director of the Thorndik Memorial Laboratory at Boston City Hospital. He also worked in the Peter Bent Brigham Hospital as a staff member. He was a member of the Pernicious Anemia Committee at Harvard and served on the Anti-Anemia Preparation Advisory Board of the U.S. Pharmacopoeia.

Minot was elected to the American Academy of Arts and Sciences in 1926. In 1930, Minot was awarded the Cameron Prize for Therapeutics of the University of Edinburgh with William P. Murphy. Minot shared the 1934 Nobel Prize in Physiology or Medicine with William P. Murphy and George H. Whipple given for their work on the treatment of blood anemia. They all discovered an effective treatment for pernicious anemia, which was a terminal disease at the time, with raw animal liver concentrate. This was later identified as being naturally high in vitamin B_{12}, which became the later cure. He was elected to the American Philosophical Society in 1935 and a member of the United States National Academy of Sciences in 1937.

== Personal life and death ==
Minot was diagnosed with diabetes mellitus in 1921 at the age of 35, by Dr Elliott P. Joslin, a fellow professor at Harvard Medical School and one of the leading diabetes doctors of his time. Diabetes was a fatal disease at the time. Joslin kept him alive the only way he knew, by restricting food. Minot was 6 feet one inches tall and only weighed 135 pounds. Joslin put him on a diet of only 530 calories per day. Minot, like most every diabetes patient, at the time, would probably die within a year.

However, insulin was discovered at about the same time Minot was diagnosed. Insulin became widely available about a year later Dr. William Castle observed that Frederick Banting's and Charles Best's discovery of insulin in 1921, not only transformed diabetes treatment, but also, by keeping Minot alive, contributed towards the discovery of a cure for pernicious anemia. Minot and Murphy's famous paper Treatment of pernicious anemia by a special diet was published in 1926.

Minot began developing complications associated with diabetes in 1940, and suffered a serious stroke in 1947, which partially paralyzed him. He died in Brookline, Massachusetts on February 25, 1950. He was a Unitarian. His home in Brookline, Massachusetts, was designated a National Historic Landmark in recognition for his work.

Minot and his wife Marian Linzee Minot (Weld) (1890–1979), whom he married in 1915, had two daughters and a son.
