= Withers-Chapman House =

- U.S. National Register of Historic Places
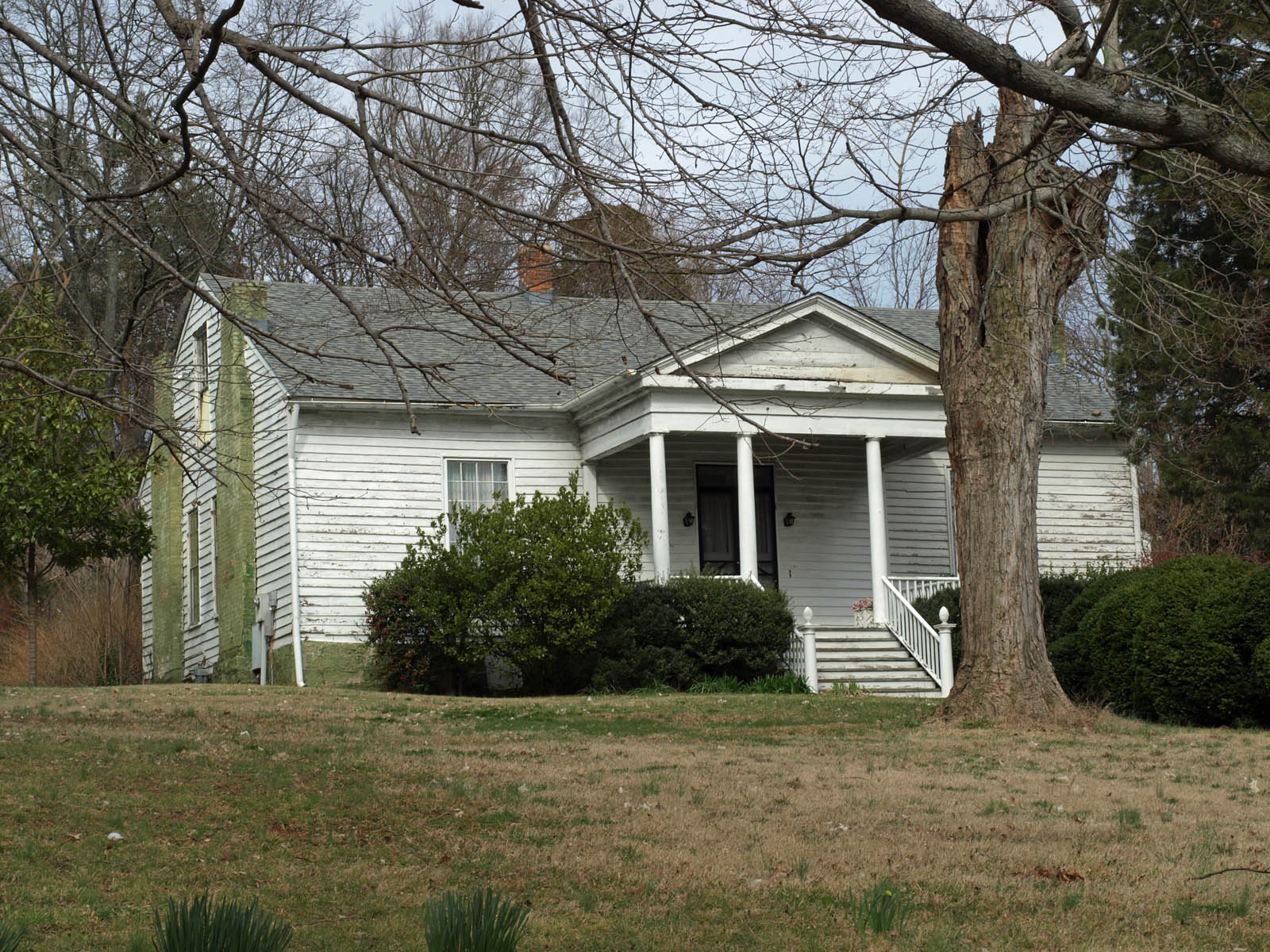
- The house in February 2012

- Location within Huntsville, Alabama Location within Alabama Location within the United States
- Location: 2409 Dairy Lane NE, Huntsville, Alabama
- Coordinates: 34°45′24″N 86°33′42″W
- Area: 2.2 acres (0.89 ha)
- Built: c. 1835
- Architectural style: Greek Revival, Federal
- NRHP reference No.: 78000501
- Added to NRHP: December 8, 1978

The Withers-Chapman House is a historic residence in Huntsville, Alabama. The house was built by Allen Christian circa 1835 as the center of a farm that would become one of the major dairy suppliers in central North Alabama. After Christian's death in 1849, the house was purchased by Augustine and Mary Withers. Former Governor of Alabama Reuben Chapman acquired the house in 1873, after his previous house nearby had been burned by departing Union soldiers in 1865. The house remained in Chapman's family from 1873 until 1971. The surrounding farmland has been sold off into suburban development, but the house retains a prominent position on a 2-acre (0.8 ha) lot on a hillside.

The 1 1/2-story house was built in the Federal style, with Greek Revival details. The house is clad in white clapboard and features a pedimented portico supported by four Tuscan columns over the entry. The portico is flanked by twelve-over-twelve sash windows. On each side of the house, two chimneys project through the end gable. There are two nine-over-nine windows between the chimneys on the main floor and a single twelve-over-twelve window on the upper floor. A central chimney and a shed roofed porch along the rear (connecting the formerly free-standing kitchen to the main house) were added in the 1930s. The interior is laid out with a central hall, with a dining room and parlor to one side and two bedrooms to the other. A stairwell at the end of the hall leads to two bedrooms upstairs. A shed roofed porch along the rear two-thirds of the eastern wall was enclosed in the 1960s to provide space for bathrooms.

The house was listed on the National Register of Historic Places in 1978.

== Monte Sano Dairy ==
Monte Sano Dairy, established in 1889 by William Matthews and Milton Humes, was home to the legendary butter-producing cow of the 1890s, Lily Flagg. The dairy was not especially close to Monte Sano Mountain, but nonetheless provided milk to much of Huntsville. Matthews left the dairy in 1894, and the Chapmans continued to operate it, quartering troops from the Spanish–American War and providing them water and milk in 1898. During the Great Depression, Josephine Gaboury gave milk to children without expecting payment, often saying "The little children must have milk." Dairy operations continued through World War II, and scaled back thereafter.
