= J. M. Chapman House =

Historic house in New Jersey, United States

- U.S. National Register of Historic Places
- New Jersey Register of Historic Places
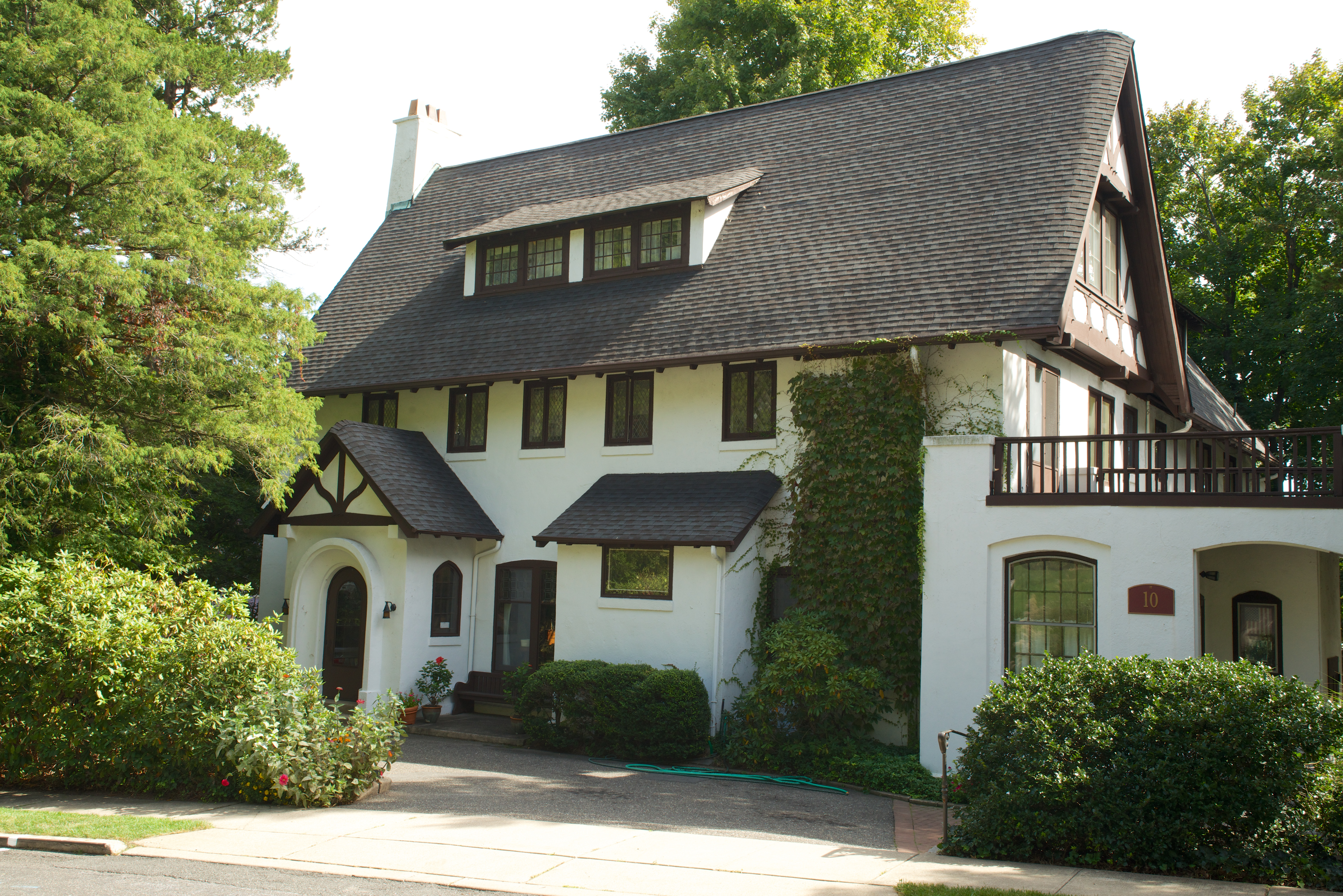

- Location within Essex County, New Jersey Location within New Jersey Location within the United States
- Location: 10 Rockledge Road, Montclair, New Jersey
- Coordinates: 40°49′22″N 74°13′38″W
- Built: 1907
- Architect: A.F. Norris
- Architectural style: Tudor Revival, Elizabethan Cottage
- MPS: Montclair MRA
- NRHP reference No.: 86002975
- NJRHP No.: 1111

Significant dates
- Added to NRHP: July 1, 1988
- Designated NJRHP: September 29, 1986

The J. M. Chapman House is located at 10 Rockledge Road in Montclair, Essex County, New Jersey, United States. It was designed by architect A.F. Norris and was built in 1907. It has also been known as Perez House. It was added to the National Register of Historic Places on July 1, 1988, for its significance in architecture. It was listed in the Selection of Montclair's Published Houses section of the Historic Resources of Montclair Multiple Property Submission (MPS).

The house was featured in American Homes & Gardens January 1906 edition.

The home was designed after a cover of the magazine published a rendering of a stately English country home. People wrote the magazine asking for the floor plans, but none existed. Mr. J. M. Chapman commissioned A.F. Norris, Architect. Completed in 1907, it was featured in the June 1908 edition of American Homes and Gardens.

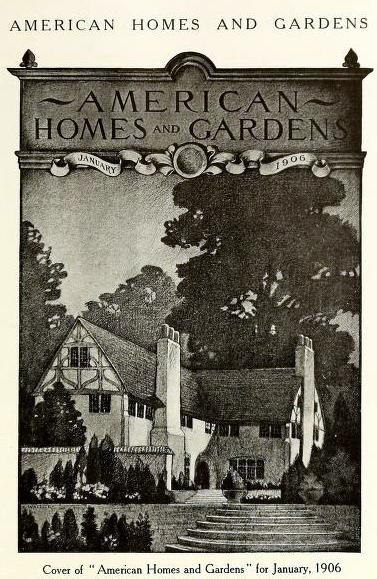

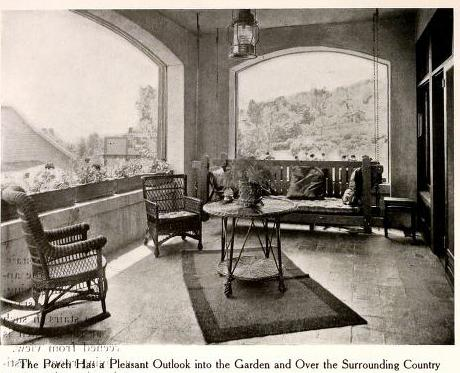

== See also ==
- National Register of Historic Places listings in Essex County, New Jersey
