= William L. and Sydney V. Murphy House =

- U.S. National Register of Historic Places
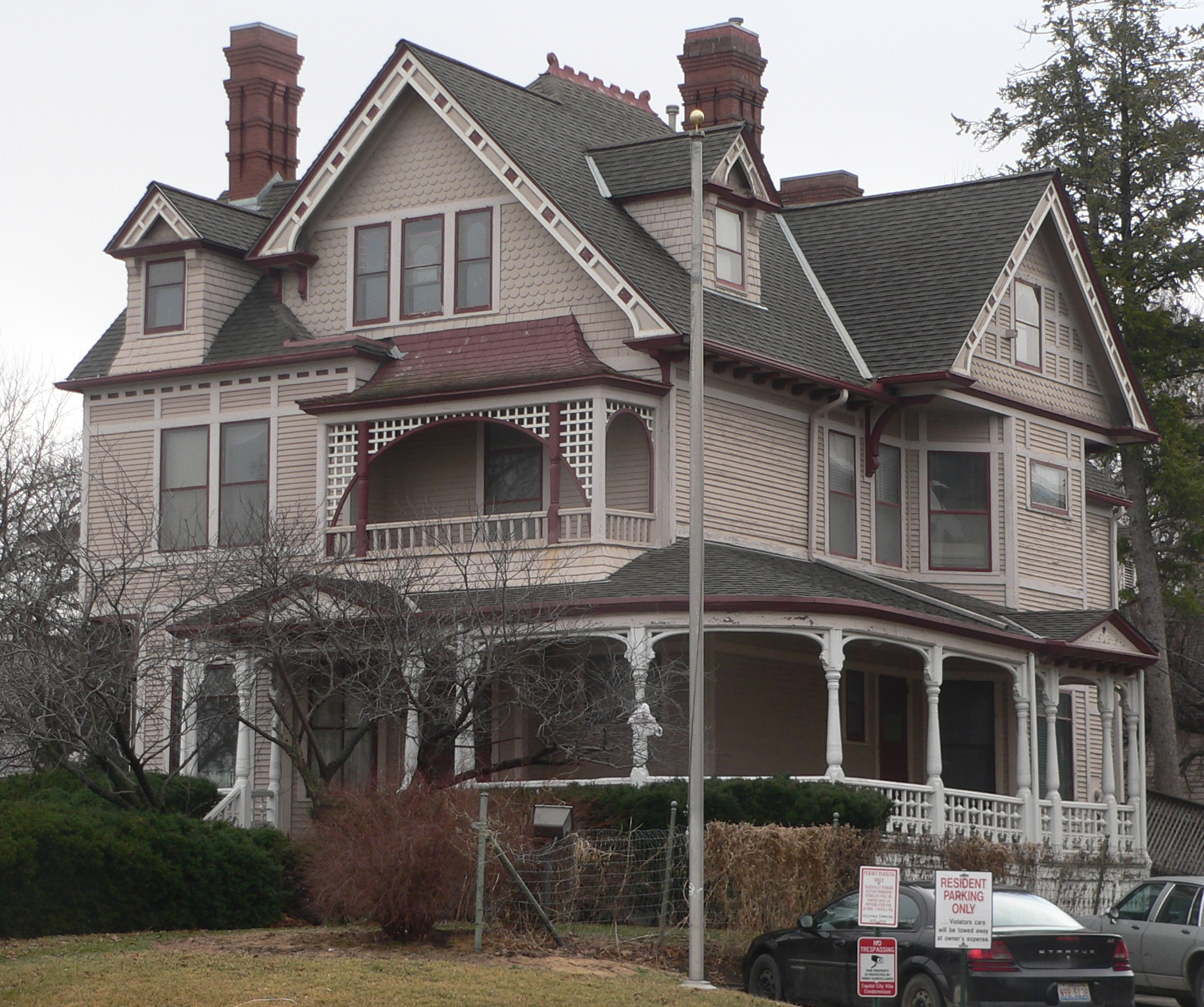
- The house in 2012

- Location within Nebraska Location within the United States
- Location: 2525 N Street, Lincoln, Nebraska
- Coordinates: 40°48′47″N 96°41′06″W
- Area: 0.4 acres (0.16 ha)
- Built: 1889
- Architectural style: Queen Anne
- NRHP reference No.: 94001280
- Added to NRHP: November 4, 1994

The William L. and Sydney V. Murphy House is a historic two-and-a-half-story house in Lincoln, Nebraska. It was built in 1889 for William L. Murphy and his wife Sydney, and it was designed in the Queen Anne style. It later belonged to art collector and patron Frances Sheldon, the namesake of the Sheldon Museum of Art. It has been listed on the National Register of Historic Places since November 4, 1994.
