= A. F. Chapman House =

Historic house in New York, United States

- U.S. National Register of Historic Places
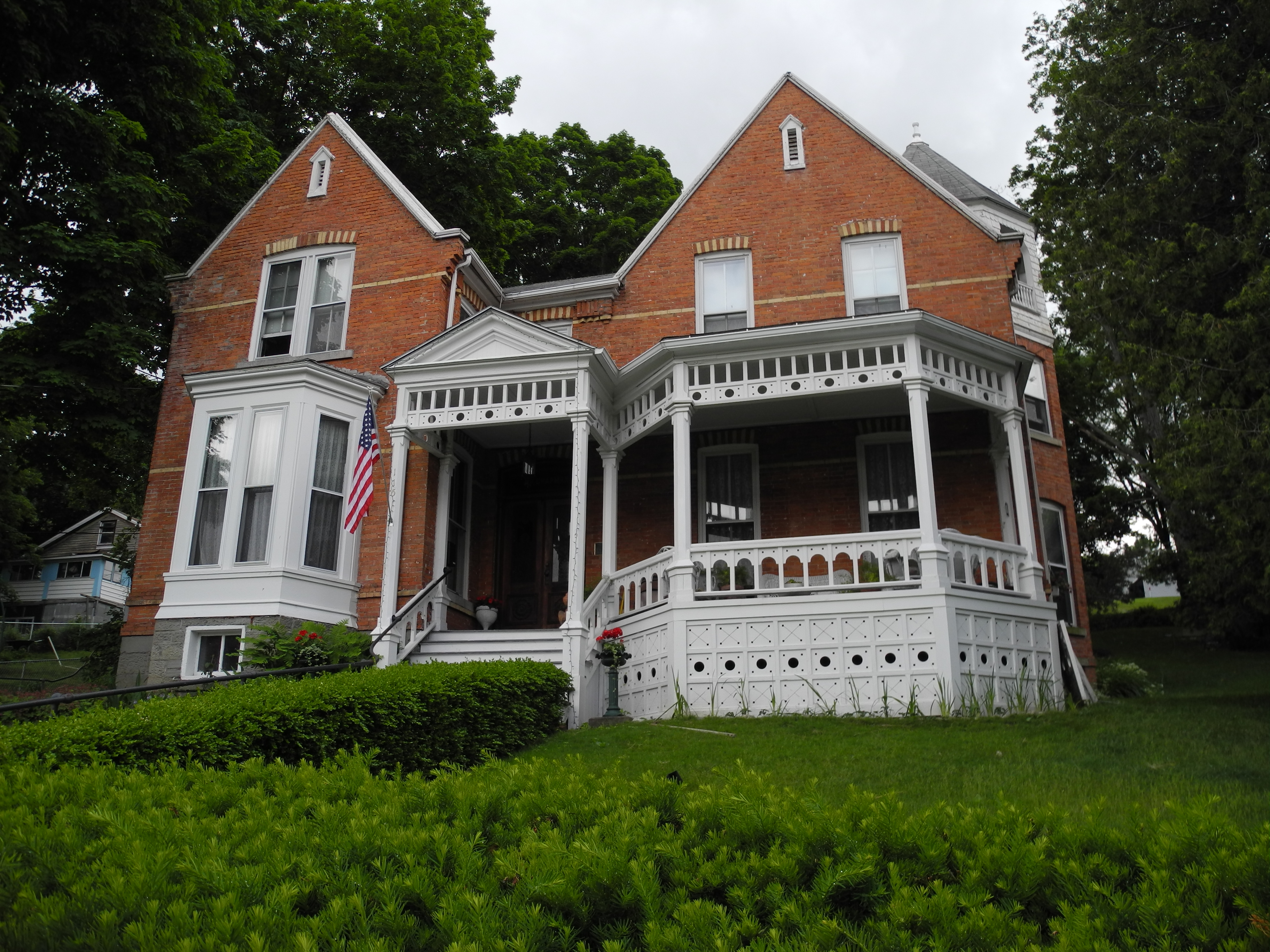

- Location within New York Location within the United States
- Location: 115 S. Monroe St., Watkins Glen, New York
- Coordinates: 42°22′53″N 76°52′29″W
- Area: less than one acre
- Built: 1870
- Architectural style: Late Victorian, Gothic Revival, Queen Anne
- NRHP reference No.: 97001526
- Added to NRHP: December 8, 1997

The A. F. Chapman House is a historic house located at 115 South Monroe Street in Watkins Glen, Schuyler County, New York.

== Description and history ==
It was built in 1870–1873 in the Gothic Revival style and modified in about 1888–1894. It is a 2 1/2-story, High Victorian/Queen Anne–style building with a steeply pitched gable roof. It features a three-story tower with Queen Anne style details.

It was listed on the National Register of Historic Places on December 8, 1997.
