= Daniel F. Murphy House =

Historic house in Boise, Idaho

- U.S. National Register of Historic Places
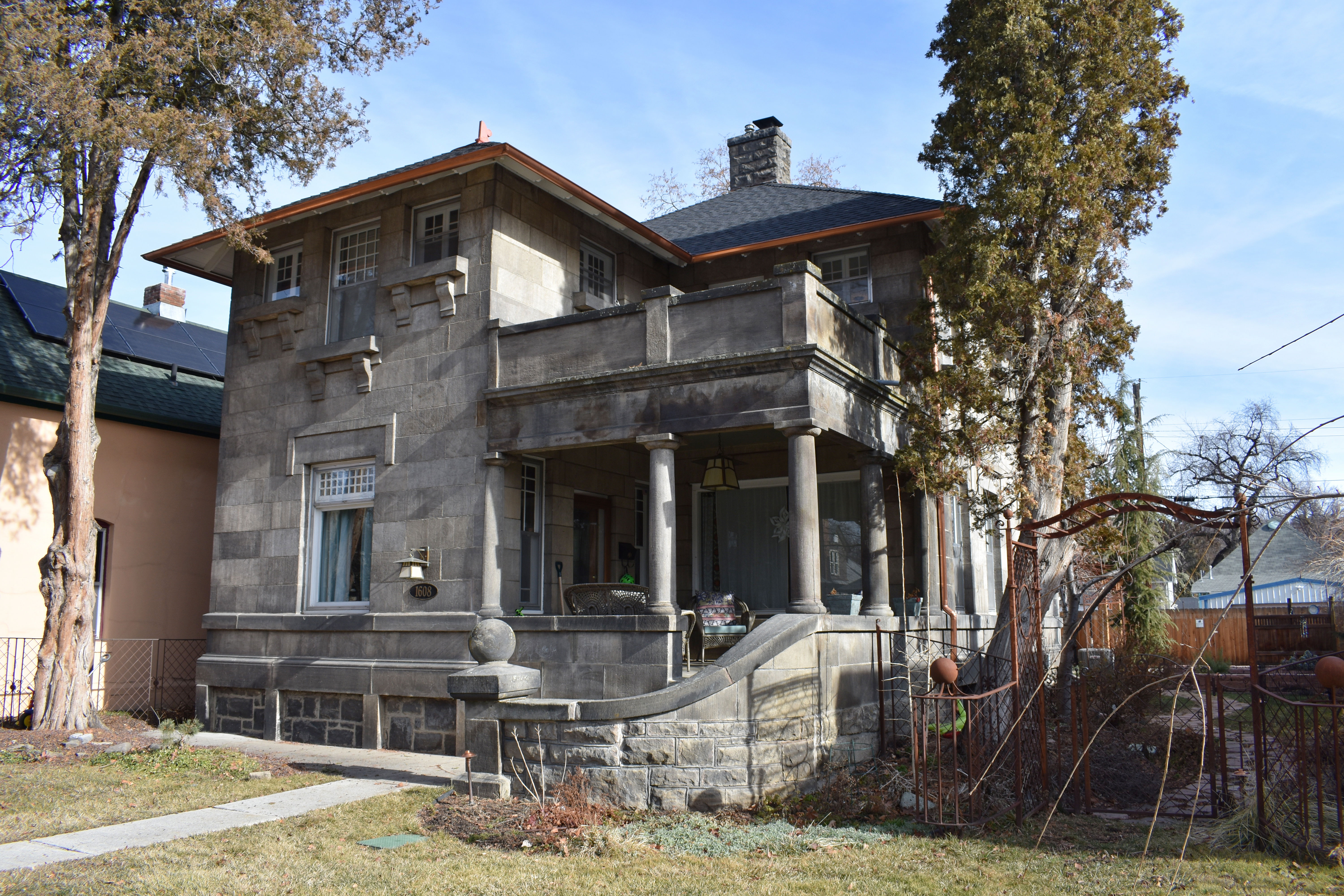
- The Daniel F. Murphy House in 2019

- Location within Idaho Location within the United States
- Location: 1608 N. 9th St., Boise, Idaho
- Coordinates: 43°37′44″N 116°11′51″W
- Area: less than one acre
- Built: 1908
- Built by: Murphy, Daniel F.
- Architectural style: Bungalow/craftsman, Renaissance, Neo-Classical
- NRHP reference No.: 82002504
- Added to NRHP: May 17, 1982

The Daniel F. Murphy House in Boise, Idaho, is a 2-story, Neoclassical structure with Renaissance decorative elements. The house features a sandstone facade and was completed in 1908 by owner Daniel F. Murphy. It was added to the National Register of Historic Places in 1982.

Daniel F. Murphy, a stonemason in Boise, was responsible for masonry work in many local and regional buildings, including the Idaho State Capitol, St. John's Cathedral, the Montandon Building, Boise High School, the Owyhee Hotel, and the Davenport Hotel.
