= Patrick Murphy House (Windsor, Connecticut) =

Historic house in Connecticut, United States

- U.S. National Register of Historic Places
- U.S. Historic district – Contributing property
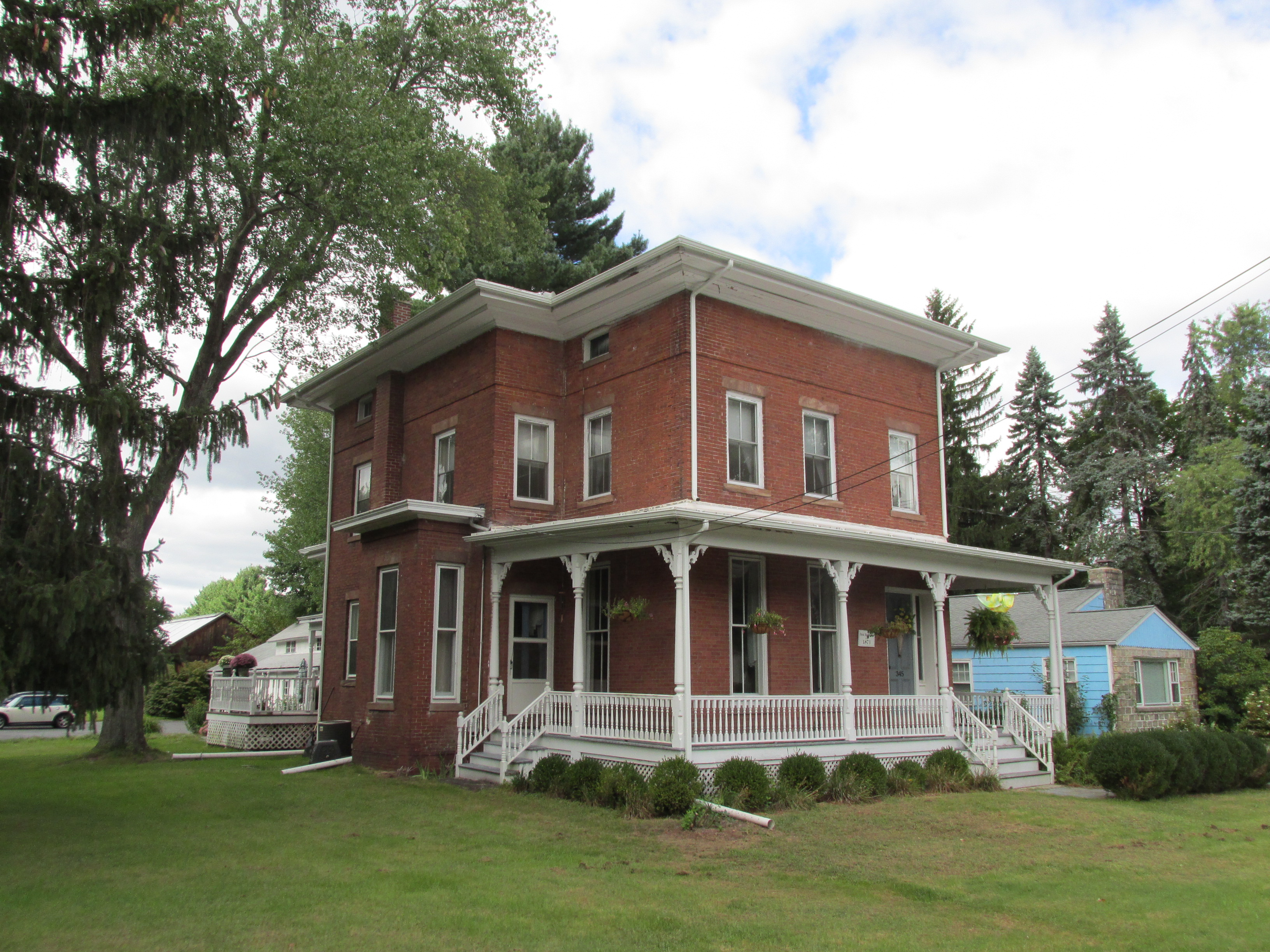

- Location within Connecticut Location within the United States
- Interactive map of Patrick Murphy House
- Location: 345 Palisado Avenue, Windsor, Connecticut
- Coordinates: 41°51′53″N 72°37′53″W
- Area: 2.3 acres (0.93 ha)
- Built: 1873
- Architectural style: Italianate
- Part of: Palisado Avenue Historic District (ID87000799)
- MPS: 18th and 19th Century Brick Architecture of Windsor TR
- NRHP reference No.: 88001490

Significant dates
- Added to NRHP: September 15, 1988
- Designated CP: August 25, 1987

The Patrick Murphy House is a historic house at 345 Palisado Avenue in Windsor, Connecticut, United States. Built about 1873, it is a good example of Italianate architecture executed in brick. It was listed on the National Register of Historic Places in 1988.

== Description and history ==
The Patrick Murphy House is located north of the Windsor town center, on the west side of Palisado Avenue (Connecticut Route 159) between Kennedy Road and Old Kennedy Road. Palisado Road is historically the major north–south road on the west bank of the Connecticut River. The house is a two-story brick building, with a low-pitch hip roof. It is basically rectangular, with a slightly projecting rectangular section on the left side. The roof has an extended eave, and there are a few small windows set just below the eave in the attic level. The main facade is three bays wide, with the main entrance in the rightmost bay, flanked by sidelight windows. A single-story porch extends across the front and around the left side to the projecting section. It has turned posts with decorative brackets at the top, and slender turned balusters. Windows under the porch are of full length, while other windows are set in rectangular openings with brownstone sills and lintels. A two-story ell with porch extends to the rear of the main block, and there is a period carriage house on the property

The house was built about 1873; it is one of several Italianate brick houses in Windsor, and makes a part of 19th-century streetscape of the Palisado Avenue Historic District.

== See also ==
- National Register of Historic Places listings in Windsor, Connecticut
