= Patrick Murphy Three-Decker =

- U.S. National Register of Historic Places
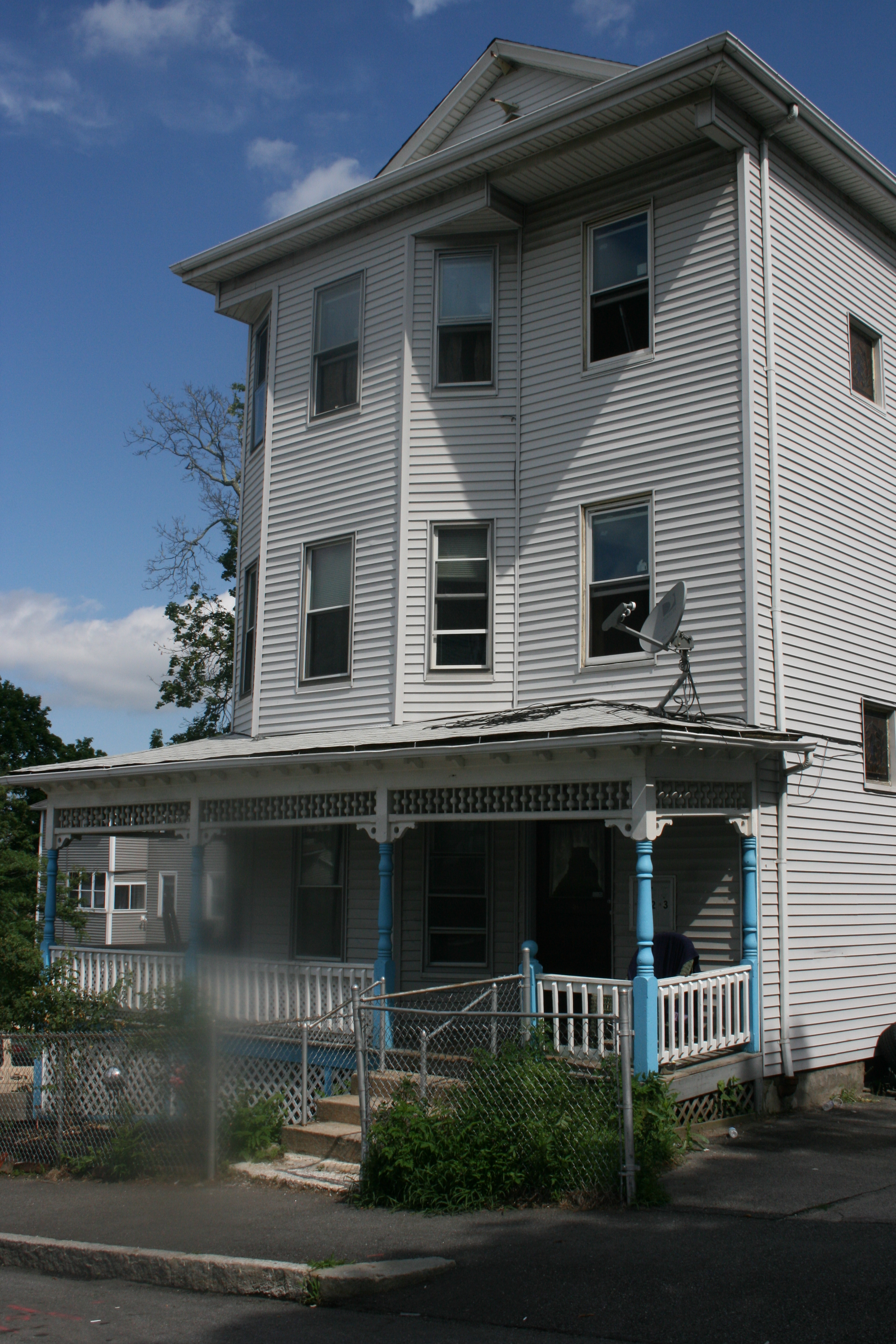

- Location within Massachusetts Location within the United States
- Location: 31 Jefferson St., Worcester, Massachusetts
- Coordinates: 42°15′13″N 71°47′38″W
- Area: less than one acre
- Built: c. 1900
- Architectural style: Queen Anne
- MPS: Worcester MRA; Worcester Three-Deckers TR
- NRHP reference No.: 89002404
- Added to NRHP: February 9, 1990

The Patrick Murphy Three-Decker is a historic triple decker house in Worcester, Massachusetts. The house was built c. 1900, and was cited as a fine example of Queen Anne architecture when was listed on the National Register of Historic Places in 1990. Some of its architectural detail has been lost since then (see photo).

== Description and history ==
The Patrick Murphy Three-Decker is located southeast of downtown Worcester, in the city's Oak Hill neighborhood. It occupies a small lot at the northeast corner of Jefferson and Arlington Streets. It is a three-story wood-frame structure, with a hip roof and exterior finished in modern siding. The main facade is asymmetrical, with a projecting polygonal window bay, three stories tall, on the left, and the main building entrance on the right. A single-story porch extends across the entire front, and is the most decorative surviving element of a once-elaborate exterior. It has turned posts which rise to brackets and a valance with a ball-and-spindle frieze. Details lost include bands of decorative shingles between the floors on the front bay, brackets in the eaves, and corner brackets with pendants at the corners of the front bay and a similar one on the side.

The house was built about 1900, when this area on the northwest slope of Grafton Hill underwent major residential development. Patrick Murphy, its first owner, was a laborer who also lived here. Its early tenants included Irish immigrants (typically laborers, machinists, or wire workers) employed in the city's southern factories.

== See also ==
- National Register of Historic Places listings in eastern Worcester, Massachusetts
