= Sunnyvale Heritage Park Museum =

Coordinates: 37.3565°N 122.0255°W

- Replica of Martin Murphy House
- Established: September 27, 2008
- Location: 570 East Remington Drive, Sunnyvale, California, U.S.
- Type: Historical museum
- Website: heritageparkmuseum.org

The Sunnyvale Heritage Park Museum is an historical museum founded in 2008 and located in Sunnyvale, California. It is a replica of the original Bay View Ranch (1850–1961), the former home of Martin Murphy Jr. (1807–1884).

== Pre-history ==
The Martin Murphy family constructed the house in 1850. Since there were no sawmills near Sunnyvale at that time, they had the lumber milled and the house assembled to their specifications on the East Coast, then shipped it in pieces around Cape Horn to Sunnyvale, where it was reassembled. It was held together with wooden pegs and leather straps, and was the first wood-frame house in the area.

The Sunnyvale Historical Society obtained its designation as a California Historical Landmark in 1960. The original house was demolished by the city in 1961 due to the construction of Central Expressway.

== History ==
The Sunnyvale Historical Museum was constructed as a replica of Bay View, at Sunnyvale Heritage Park next to the Sunnyvale Community Center. It was dedicated and opened in September, 2008, as a testament to the history of Sunnyvale and the contributions made by the Martin Murphy family towards the flourishing of the settlement around the train stop established on his land in 1864. It was funded through public donations and contributions from the State of California and the City of Sunnyvale. The exhibit rooms include three period rooms: a parlor and dining room in the 1860s era style, a kitchen, and a bedroom. A central hall shows artifacts from Sunnyvale industry, including the canneries and Hendy Iron Works, and downtown businesses. A 60-foot mural offers a pictorial view of Santa Clara Valley history from the Ohlone era to the 1950s.The upper floor houses a "Tech Wall", featuring technical developments over centuries which were invented, developed, and built in Silicon Valley and Sunnyvale. One room is set aside to show temporary rotating exhibitions of different themes. A large meeting room is also available for rent.

The museum is located next to the Orchard Heritage Park which includes a Heritage Orchard of apricot trees and a barn. The Sunnyvale Historical Society established an outdoor interpretive exhibit (OHPIE = Orchard Heritage Park Interpretive Exhibit), which was opened in 2001, on the agricultural history of the Santa Clara Valley. In December 2018, after removal of a park maintenance building, a new front entrance to the museum was created with additional outside exhibits.
