= Protestant Foster Home =

Historic house in New Jersey, United States

- U.S. National Register of Historic Places
- New Jersey Register of Historic Places
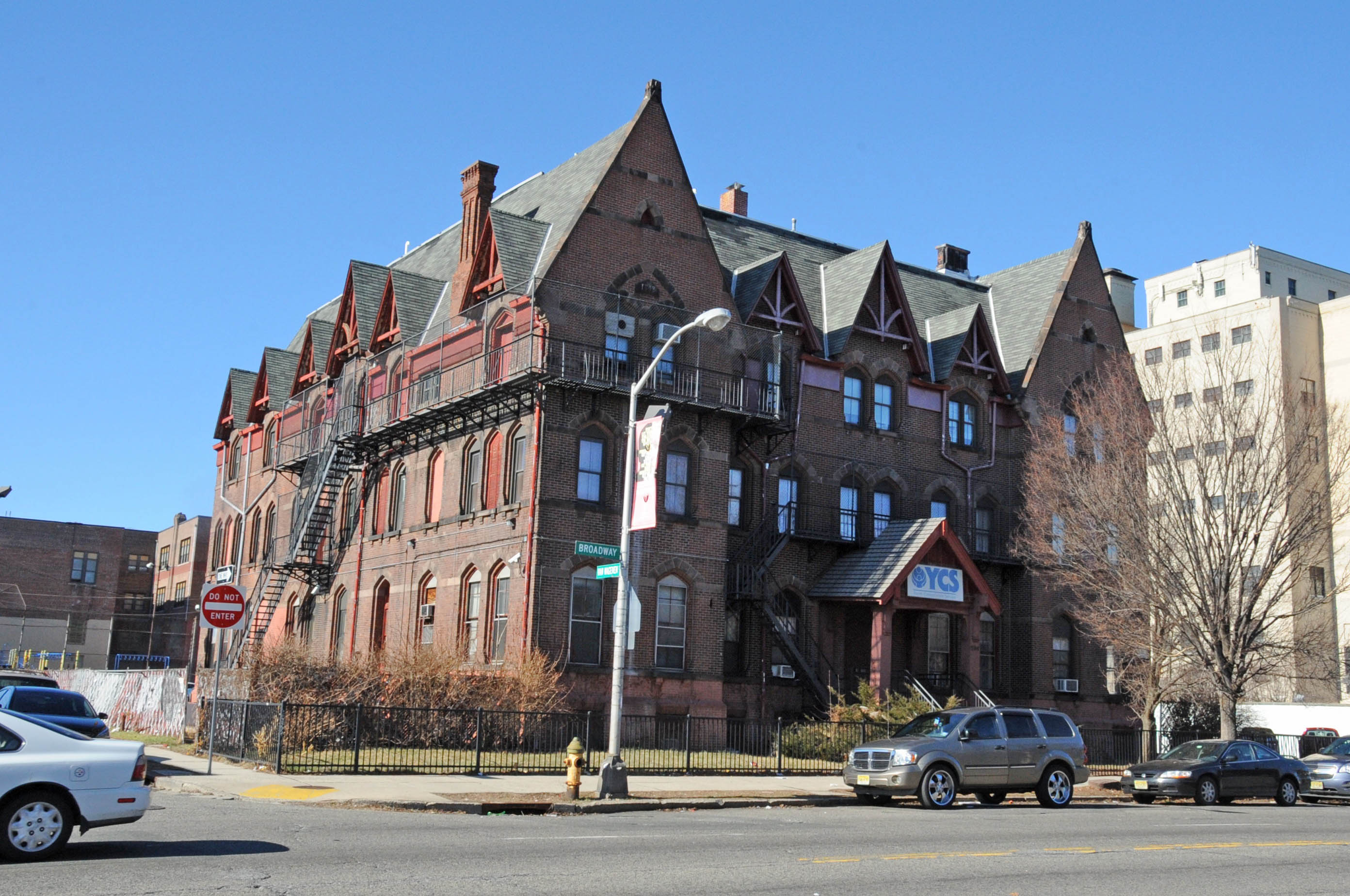

- Location within Essex County, New Jersey Location within New Jersey Location within the United States
- Location: 272–284 Broadway, Newark, New Jersey
- Coordinates: 40°45′37″N 74°10′11″W
- Area: 1 acre (0.40 ha)
- Built: 1875
- Architects: Stent, Thomas
- Architectural style: Gothic, High Victorian Gothic
- NRHP reference No.: 86000211
- NJRHP No.: 1303

Significant dates
- Added to NRHP: February 13, 1986
- Designated NJRHP: February 10, 1985

Protestant Foster Home, is located in Newark, Essex County, New Jersey, United States. The building was built in 1875 and was added to the National Register of Historic Places on February 13, 1986.

== See also ==
- National Register of Historic Places listings in Essex County, New Jersey
- Lower Broadway, Newark
