= Pine Street Historic District =

Pine Street Historic District can refer to:

- Pine Street Historic District (Providence, Rhode Island)
- Pine Street Historic District (Montclair, New Jersey), on the National Register of Historic Places listings in Essex County, New Jersey
