= List of Newark City Subway stations =

This is a list of stations of the Newark City Subway (now known as Newark Light Rail), a rapid transit system serving Newark, New Jersey and its suburbs, Belleville and Bloomfield.

== City Subway line ==
Station	Location	Notes	Date opened
Penn Station	Newark	Serves Downtown and the Ironbound district	June 20, 1937
Military Park	Newark	Serves Downtown. Formerly known as Broad Street station	May 26, 1935
Washington Street	Newark	Serves Downtown and University Heights	May 26, 1935
Warren Street	Newark	Serves University Heights	May 26, 1935
Norfolk Street	Newark	Serves University Heights. Open-cut station	May 26, 1935
Orange Street	Newark	Serves University Heights. Street-level station	May 26, 1935
Park Avenue	Newark	Serves Lower Roseville and Branch Brook Park. Open-cut station	May 26, 1935
Bloomfield Avenue	Newark	Serves Upper Roseville and Branch Brook Park. Open-cut station	May 26, 1935
Davenport Avenue	Newark	Serves Upper Roseville and Branch Brook Park. Open-cut station	May 26, 1935
Branch Brook Park	Newark	Serves Upper Roseville and Branch Brook Park. Open-cut station	2001
Silver Lake	Belleville	Street-level station	2002
Grove Street	Bloomfield	0.7 miles from Watsessing Avenue Station. Street-level station	2002

== Cedar Street Subway (defunct) ==
Station	Location	Notes	Date Opened
Penn Station	Newark		April 30, 1916
Public Service Terminal	Newark		April 30, 1916
Kresge–Broad Street	Newark	Served the Kresge-Newark department store	January 27, 1927
Washington Street	Newark		April 30, 1916

== See also ==
- List of Broad Street Extension stations
