= Old Essex County Jail =

- U.S. National Register of Historic Places
- New Jersey Register of Historic Places
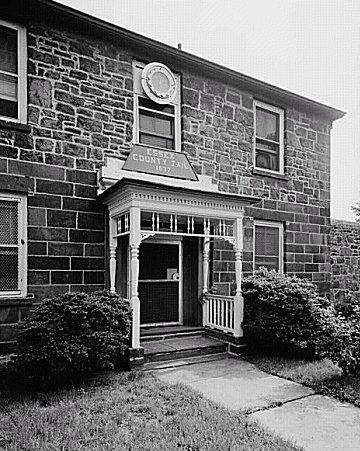
- Essex County Jail in 1940.

- Location within Essex County, New Jersey Location within New Jersey Location within the United States
- Location: Corner of Newark and New Streets, Newark, New Jersey
- Coordinates: 40°44′40″N 74°10′58″W
- Area: 1.5 acres (0.61 ha)
- Built: 1837-1926
- Architect: John Haviland
- Architectural style: Greek Revival, Italianate
- Website: oldessexcountyjail.org
- NRHP reference No.: 91001366

Significant dates
- Added to NRHP: September 3, 1991
- Designated NJRHP: March 11, 1991

The old Essex County Jail is located in the University Heights section of Newark, Essex County, New Jersey, United States. The jail is Essex County's oldest public building and a national landmark of value for its architectural and social history. The complex consists of about 20 structures of various size, age, and function ranging in date from the 1830s to 1930s. Collectively, they represent the evolution of American prison history over 100 years. For the quality of its architecture, its social history, and its links to the 1967 Newark Riots, this jail was added to the National Register of Historic Places on September 3, 1991. The site has been abandoned since 1971 and remains property of the City of Newark.

== Geography ==
The jail was originally located at the city's edge in a neighborhood of farms and factories, adjacent to the recently completed Morris Canal. The grounds are now located adjacent to the Norfolk Street station of the Newark Light Rail, which was built along the route of the former canal bed in the 1930s. Due to the urban environment and geography, the jail's various buildings are tightly crowded over 1.5 acres - originally with few green spaces between for inmate recreation.

== History ==
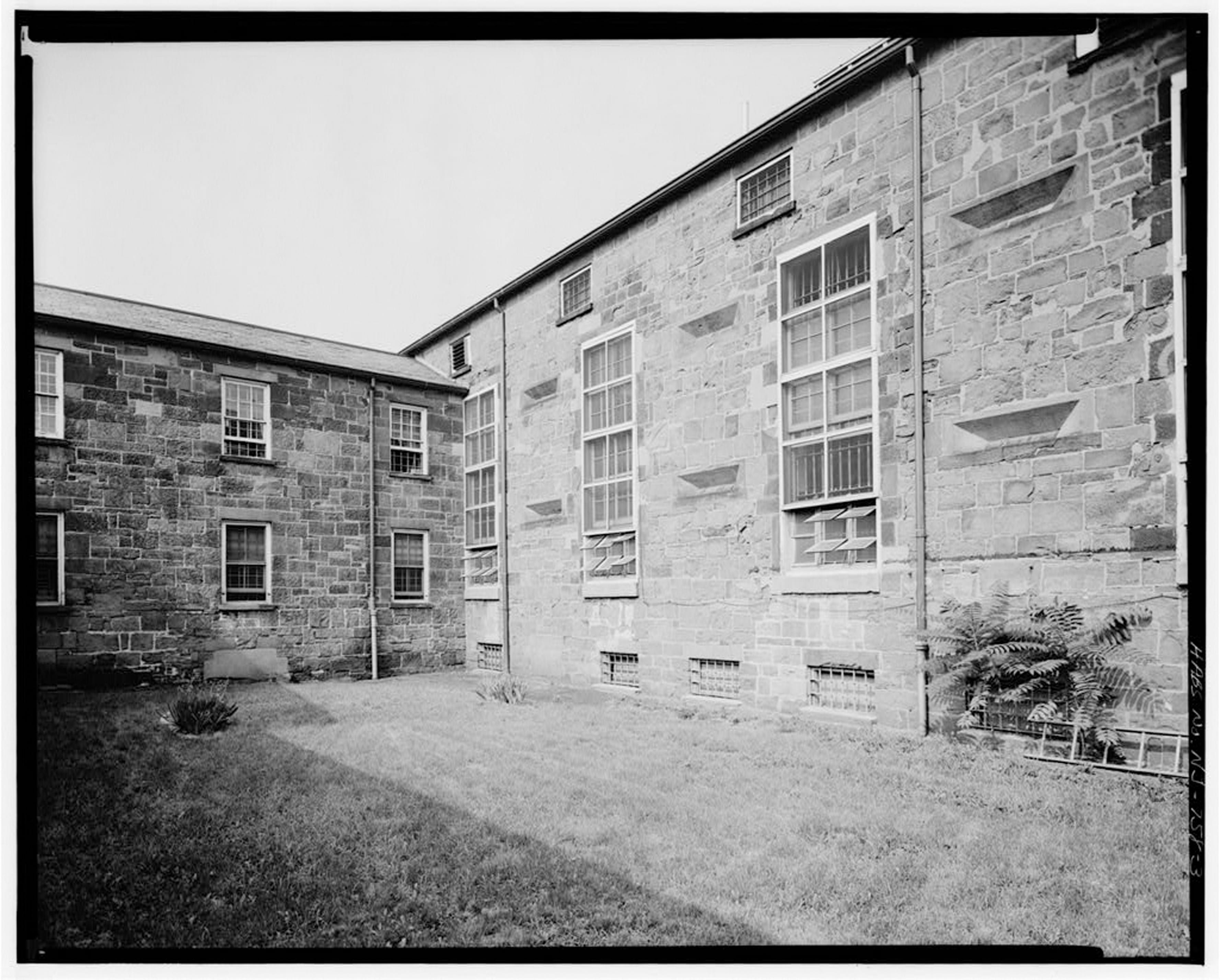
Execution yard in the jail

English architect and social reformer John Haviland designed and built the jail in 1837 at the corner of Newark and New Streets. Haviland was an established prison architect at the time who was most notable for Eastern State Penitentiary, among other prison designs that emphasized prisoner reform over brutal punishment. The Morris Canal ran adjacent to the jail and formed the back of the property line. When the building was first built it was known as the Newark Street Jail. This jail replaced an earlier structure located at the corner of Broad and Walnut Streets at the present site of the Grace Episcopal Church.

Haviland's jail consisted of a two-story square building built of brick and local brownstone in the Greek Revival style. Behind this there rose a three-story sandstone structure – measuring roughly 75 by 100 feet – with tiers of cells running down the center. This cell block functioned as a temporary holding facility while inmates awaited trial and conviction. After conviction, inmates moved to the state prison in Caldwell, built 1872 and now demolished. In 1890, and again in 1893, 1903, and 1907, Haviland's original building was expanded with multiple additions increasing the number of prison cells upwards of 300. However, actual inmates numbers were often closer to 500 due to severe overcrowding during events like the 1967 Newark Riots. The building was also updated to include running water and toilet facilities in each cell. The building served as Essex County's main jail until 1971 when a new jail was built. In 1991, scenes for the film Malcolm X were shot at the jail. In 2003, a fire devastated the Women's Wing built 1895, which is now in rubble. The property is currently unsecured, open to trespassers and urban explorers, and frequently featured in ruins photography.

== Current Site Conditions ==
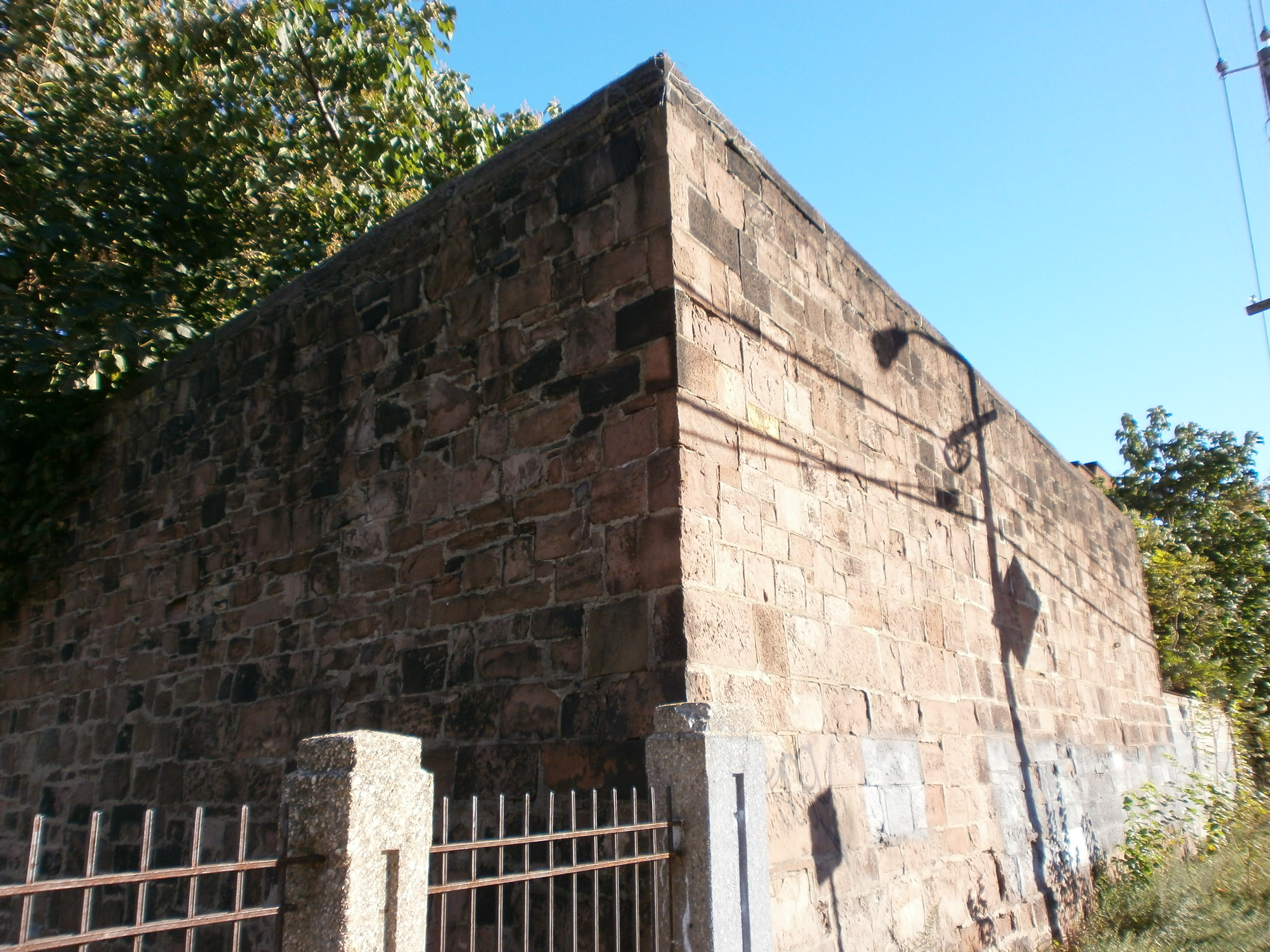
Perimeter wall by Morris Canal

The building was severely damaged by fire in 2003. A new science park was planned for the site, but plans never left the drawing board. The design called for demolishing the entire structure, but the city's landmarks committee, which seeks to have the jail preserved, rejected the plan in 2010. The jail is rapidly decaying and many sections have already fallen down. In particular, The Warden's House, which dates from 1837, has partially collapsed due to lack of maintenance. Pending more detailed surveys, the other sections need to be stabilized before the structure is rehabilitated.

In July 2017, Rutgers Law School applied to de-register the facility from the National Register of Historic Places and the New Jersey Register of Historic Places; de-registering the site would allow demolition to go forward with no legal requirements for a feasibility study of possible reuses.

In spring 2018, a team of graduate students at Columbia University GSAPP researched the architectural and social history of this structure and set forth eleven proposals for the jail's reuse. This research became the subject of a spring 2019 design studio and exhibit in the Newark's Hahne's Building with funding from the Hanini Group, NJ Appleseed, and Newark Landmarks. This represents a first concrete step toward this structure's constructive reuse.

== See also ==
National Register of Historic Places listings in Essex County, New Jersey

The architect John Haviland was known as the "jailer to the world." He constructed several other jails nearby in a series of jails, all with similar materials, construction, and design. As follows:

- Eastern State Penitentiary in Philadelphia (1821–29).
- New Jersey State Prison near Trenton (1832–6).
- Rebuilding of Western State Penitentiary near Pittsburgh (1833–36).
- The Tombs (Hall of Justice) in Lower Manhattan (1835–38, demolished 1902).
- Missouri State Penitentiary, Jefferson City, MO (1836). Closed in 2004.
- Berks County Jail, Reading, PA (1848).
- Lancaster County Jail, 625 E. King Street, Lancaster, PA (1851).
- Rhode Island State Penitentiary
- (Old) Allegheny County Jail, Pittsburgh, PA.
- Luzerne County Jail, Wilkes-Barre, Pennsylvania (circa 1850).
