= Orange Street station =

Orange Street station may refer to:

- Orange Street station (Newark Light Rail), a light rail station in Newark, New Jersey
- Media–Orange Street station, a light rail station in Media, Pennsylvania
