= Newark station (New Jersey) =

Newark station (New Jersey) may refer to:

- Newark Broad Street station, a New Jersey Transit commuter rail station
- Newark Liberty International Airport Station, a rail station
- Newark Penn Station, a major transportation hub

== See also ==
- List of Newark City Subway stations in Newark, New Jersey and its suburbs
