= New Jersey Subway =

New Jersey Subway can refer to any underground rapid transit system in New Jersey. This includes the following:

- PATH (rail system) in Newark and Hudson County
- Newark Light Rail, which includes the Newark City Subway
- PATCO Speedline, in Camden County
- River Line (NJ Transit), in Camden, Burlington, and Mercer Counties
