= Newark Public Service Terminal =

Transit terminal in Newark, New Jersey

Coordinates: 40.737642°N 74.169602°W

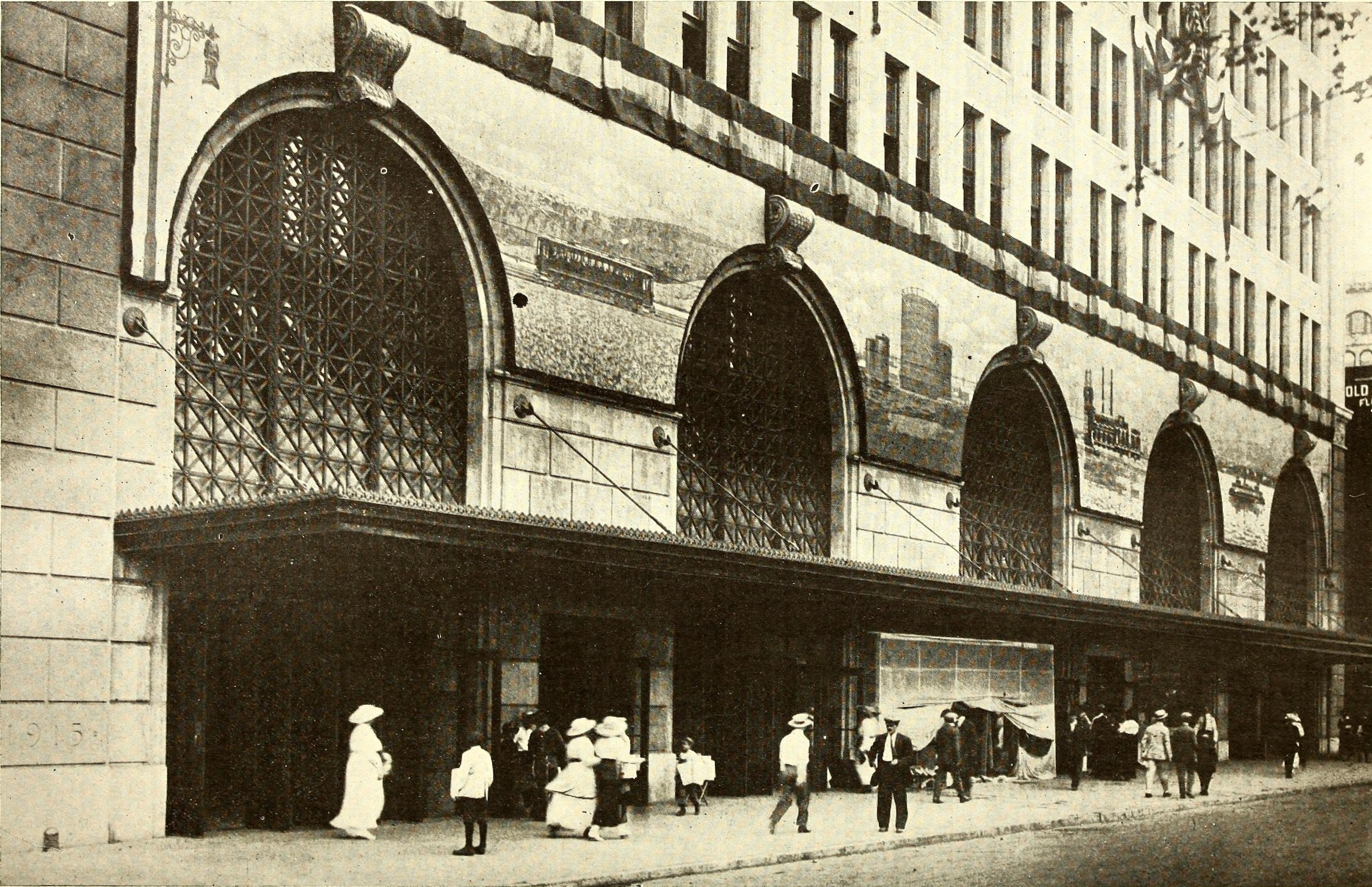
The facade of the newly opened Terminal in 1916

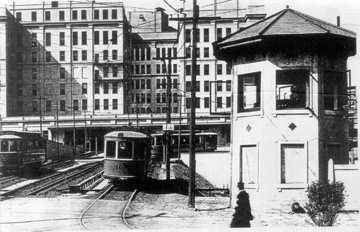
A 1917 view of the ramp to the upper level of the terminal.

The Public Service Terminal was a three-level streetcar station in Newark, New Jersey, owned and operated by the Public Service Corporation, adjacent to the Hudson and Manhattan Railroad's Park Place station. It served as the terminus for streetcar lines from as far as Trenton. Public Service was both a transportation company and a utility, providing electric and gas service to much of northern New Jersey. The six office stories above the terminal served as company headquarters.

The terminal, opened on April 30, 1916 was located at the northeast corner of Park Place and Raymond Boulevard at Military Park, a few blocks away from the busy downtown crossing at Broad and Market Streets. It provided an off-street terminal for streetcars, and a central location for riders. The street entrance was between the two track levels, and provided access to the office floors and to both terminals. Most cars used the upper level, reached by a ramp from Mulberry Street on the east side. Some used the lower level, reached on the west side from Washington Street by a two-block Cedar Street Subway. In 1916 the upper level saw 2,050 cars a day and the lower 550 cars, with more than 50,000 fares paid per day. In 1935 the lower level was connected to the newly built City Subway, which ran under Raymond Boulevard adjacent to the terminal, to allow cars to continue to the subway terminal at Penn Station. The eastbound connection passed under the City Subway to avoid a grade crossing.

Like most trolley companies, Public Service converted its routes to bus lines during the 1930s. The last streetcar line using the terminal upper level was the #1-Newark line to Exchange Place Terminal in Jersey City, which ended on August 1, 1937. The last on the lower level was the #43-Jersey City line, running to Exchange Place Terminal by a different route, which ended on May 1, 1938. The terminal continued in use for bus routes. The lower level was used until May 1966, and the upper level until 1978.

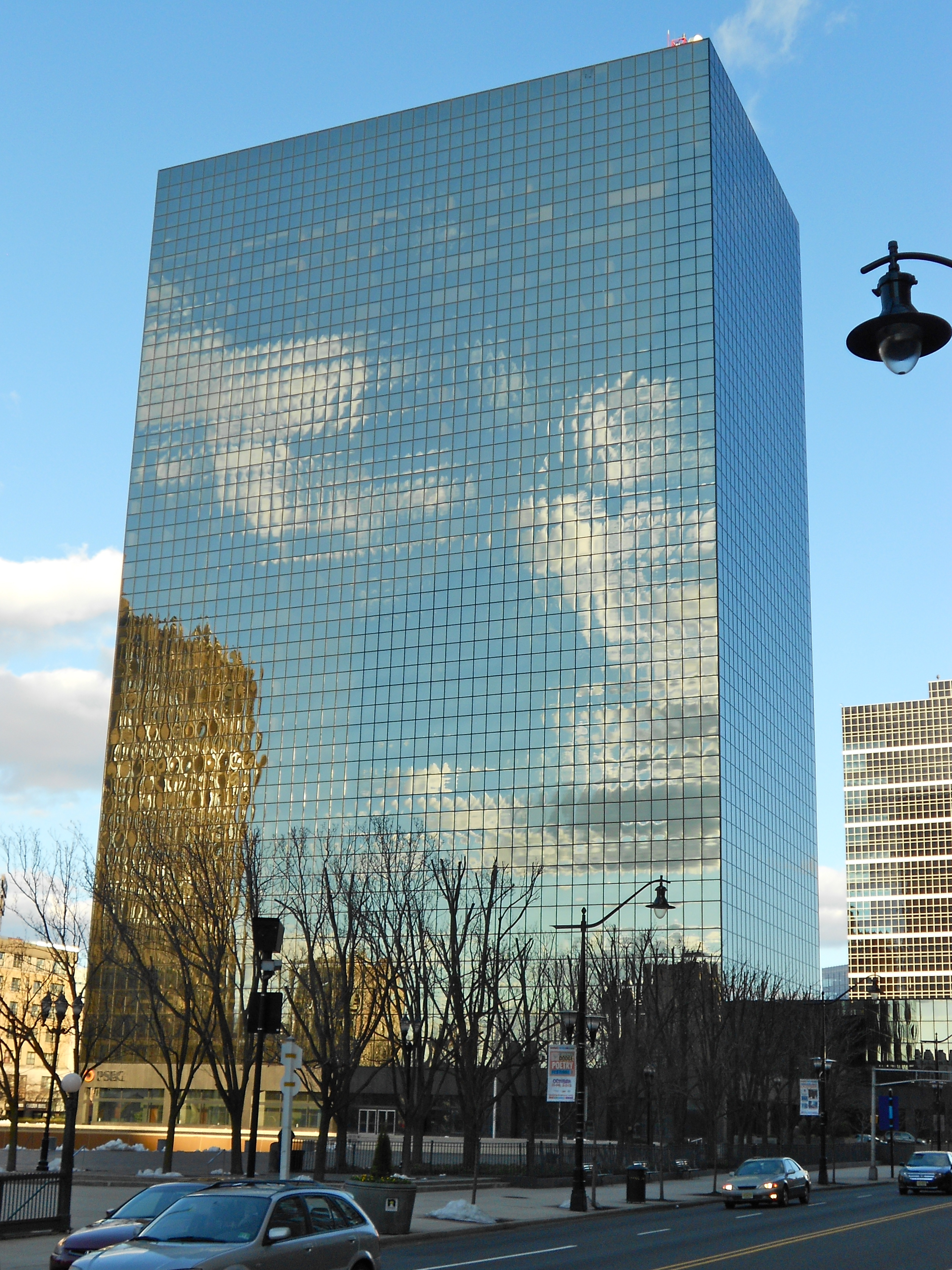
80 Park Plaza

Public Service sold its transportation system to the New Jersey Transit in 1981, consisting of a large network of bus lines and one trolley line, the City Subway. The terminal building was demolished via implosion on June 14, 1981 and replaced with the Public Service Enterprise Group headquarters, 80 Park Plaza. The unused Cedar Street Subway from the portal to a wall east of Broad Street still exists. The City Subway tunnel has become part of the Broad Street branch of the Newark Light Rail, emerging at Centre Street.

== See also ==
- Newark and New York Branch
