= Weston Museum (New Jersey) =

Coordinates: 40.742°N 74.179°W

The Weston Museum is located within the Van Houten Library at the New Jersey Institute of Technology in the University Heights section of Newark, New Jersey. The small museum contains items developed and manufactured by Edward Weston, as well as instruments and devices from his laboratory. A contemporary of Thomas Edison, Weston was a scientist, an inventor, and a founding member of the board of trustees of the university and the Weston Electric Company. Dr. Weston's rare book collection is also maintained available to scholars and others interested in the history of science and technology.

== See also ==
- Eberhardt Hall
- Newark Museum
