= Council for Higher Education in Newark =

College association in New Jersey, US

Started in 1971, the Council for Higher Education in Newark (CHEN) consisted of four public institutions of higher learning in Newark, New Jersey including: New Jersey Medical School - Rutgers, New Jersey Institute of Technology (NJIT), Rutgers–Newark, and Essex County College. The schools are all located in the city's University Heights neighborhood which borders downtown.

The institutions that made up CHEN were organized as an unincorporated association. CHEN was founded to foster internal cooperation among the four institutions with regard to research and educational opportunities for their respective populations and to contribute to the ongoing revitalization of University Heights, and, more broadly, to the economic development of Newark and the northern New Jersey region in general.
