= University Heights, Newark =

Populated place in Essex County, New Jersey, US

Coordinates: 40°44′28″N 74°10′59″W

University Avenue in Newark, New Jersey

University Heights is a neighborhood in Newark in Essex County, in the U.S. state of New Jersey. It is so named because of the five academic institutions located within its boundaries: Rutgers University–Newark, New Jersey Institute of Technology (NJIT), New Jersey Medical School (NJMS), Rutgers Law School and Essex County College (ECC). In total, the schools enroll approximately 28,000 degree-seeking students.

The University Heights neighborhood is roughly bounded by University Avenue to the east, Orange Street to the north, Bergen Street to the west, and South Orange Avenue to the south. The schools are involved in the development of University Heights Science Park, a major research complex to be located between their campuses. The Public Health Research Institute on Warren Street relocated there in 2002. The area is home to Science Park High School as well. BioTrials, a French biological research company is one of the first firms to locate there.

Rutgers and NJIT have expanded considerably since the 1960s. Prior to this expansion, University Heights was one of the more affluent residential neighborhood of Newark. The area has one of Newark's few concentrations of brownstones. The gym at Essex County College was home of the American Basketball Association team, the Newark Express, which moved to Drew University and became the Jersey Express after averaging some 150 fans per game in Newark, though it attracted even fewer at Drew. The area is home to the Paul Robeson Galleries at Rutgers University and the Weston Museum in the Van Houten Library at the New Jersey Institute of Technology, which includes artifacts from inventor Edward Weston, an early challenger of Thomas Edison.

One of the main north-south thoroughfares of University Heights is Martin Luther King, Jr. Blvd. (formerly High Street) home to many historic buildings. Eberhardt Hall at NJIT, St. Mary's Abbey Church, Essex County Hall of Records, and Essex County Veterans Courthouse are among Newark's registered historic places, as is the former Essex County Jail. The neighborhood is served by the Washington Street, Warren Street/NJIT, and Norfolk Street stations of Newark's Light Rail which links to Manhattan via the PATH and NJTransit rail systems at Newark's Penn Station.

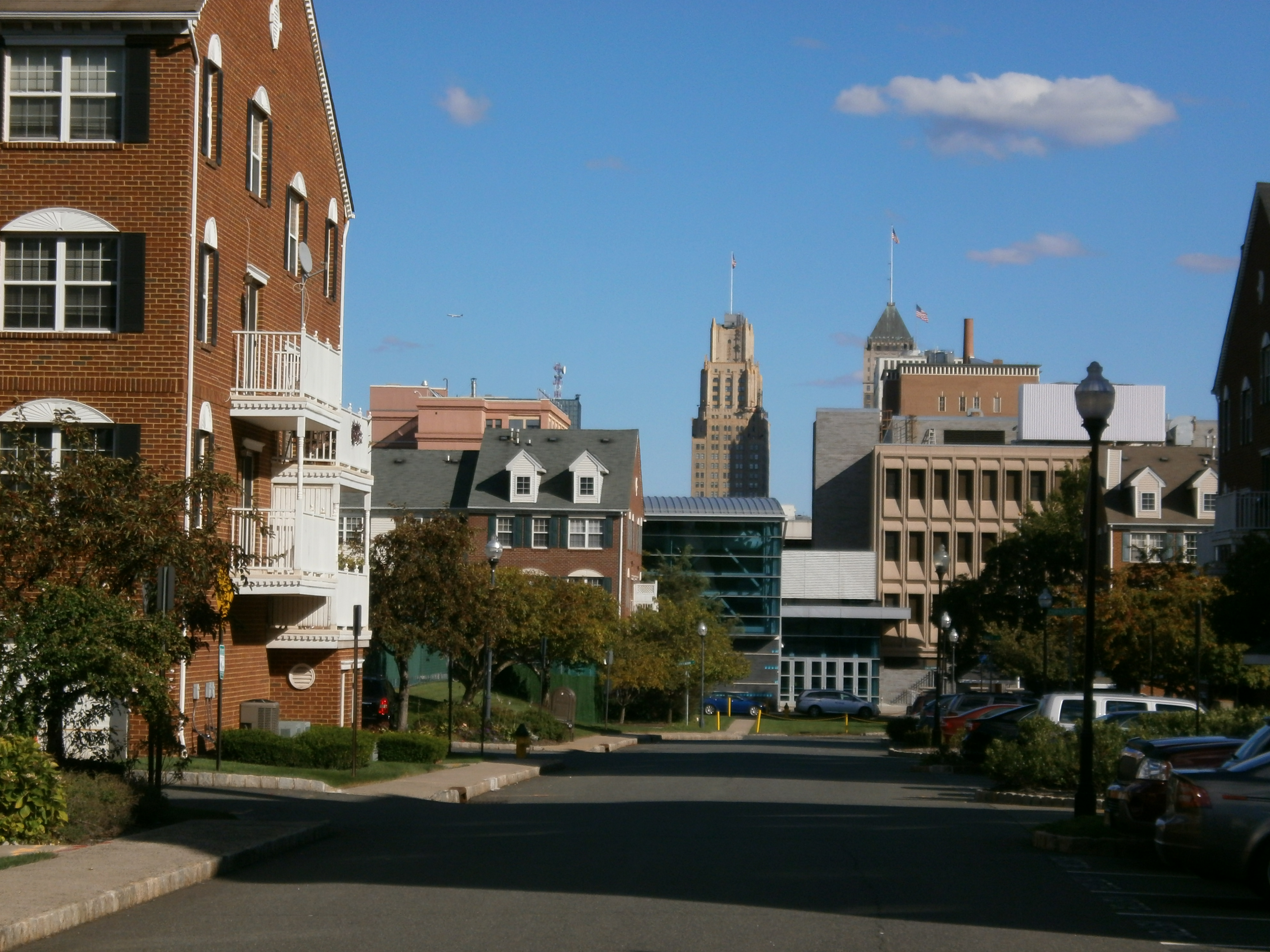
A view east along Academy Street from Society Hill towards downtown. In the center at the end of street the buildings visible in the mid-ground are part of Newark Tech (operates as part of the Essex County Vocational Technical Schools).

== History ==
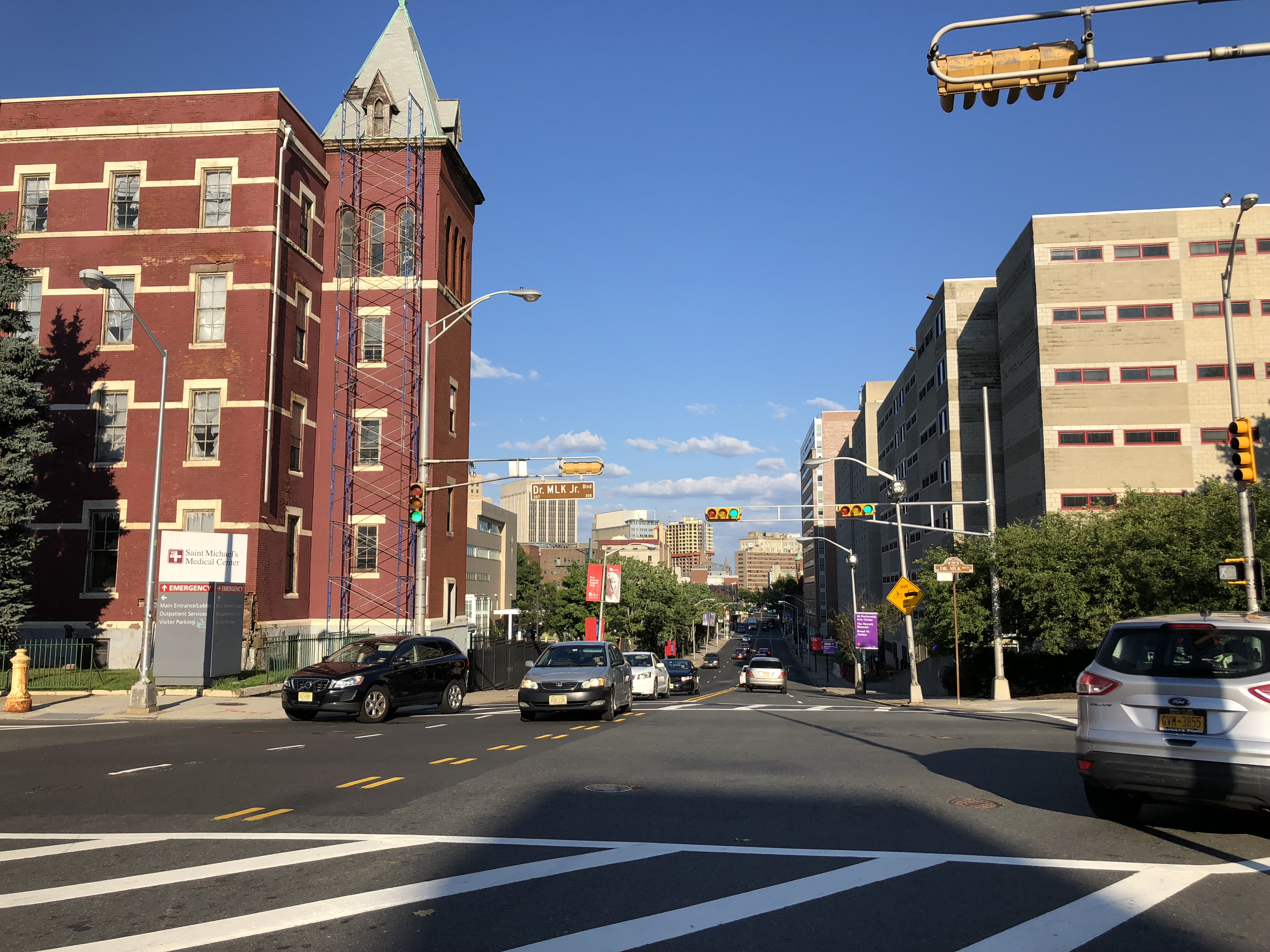
Central Avenue looking east to Downtown

Before the expansion of the universities in the 1960s, the area was modestly affluent and home to many brownstones (as evidenced by the nearby James Street Historic District Downtown). University Avenue was formerly known as Plane Street, as seen in the Washington Street Subway Station where signage directs riders to "Plane Street". High Street, one of the main streets, was renamed Dr. Martin Luther King Jr. Blvd in honor of the civil rights leader .

== New development ==
After the civil unrest in 1967, the University Heights area fell into sharp decline (as with many neighboring areas in the city). Revitalization came through the expansion of all 4 universities/colleges in its boundaries; K. Hovnanian's Society Hill, a market-rate, 13 acre townhouse development just behind UMDNJ and expansion of nearly all the high schools. Recently, the Essex County Parks Commission created and built Veterans Memorial Park on the former site of a parking garage, as part of a renovation of the adjacent county complex, which itself was upgraded with a new parking deck, streetscape improvements, walking paths and various building upgrades to the Hall of Records, Essex County Veterans Courthouse and former jail, creating a more curb appealing entrance to Downtown Newark.

Baxter Park, a mixed-use development started in July 2011 that will include 400 apartment units along with shopping and recreation space, will replace the 500 units in the original Baxter Terrace development, which was demolished starting in 2008. Bio-Trials, a French pharmaceutical research and development company constructed a modern eight story office and research facility on Norfolk St. in 2018. The US Public Health Research Institute is located on Warren St. It was constructed several years ago. There are a host of other projects planned or under construction.

== Education ==
=== Colleges and universities ===
- New Jersey Institute of Technology
- Rutgers–Newark
- Rutgers Health (Formerly University of Medicine and Dentistry of New Jersey)
- Essex County College

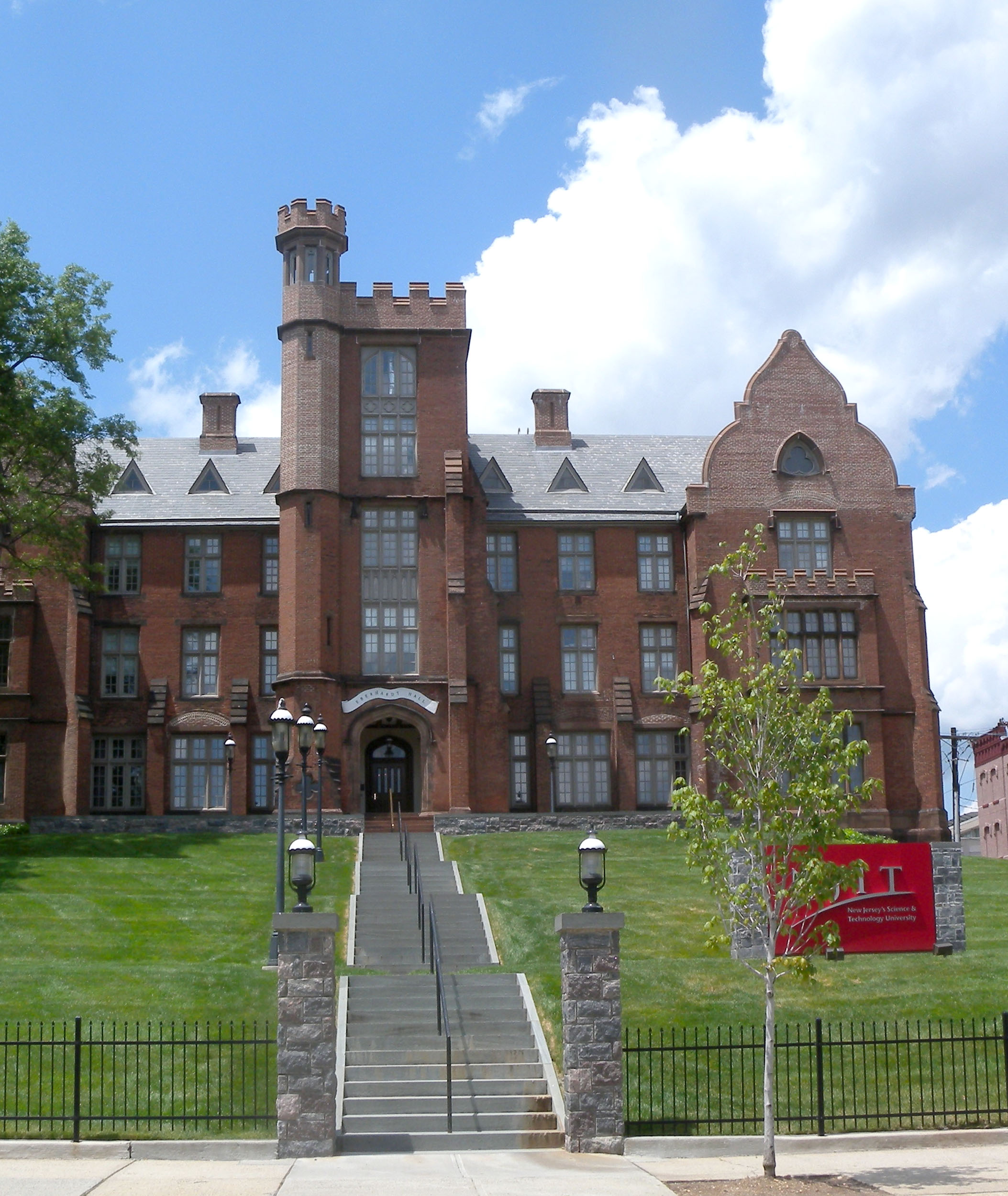
Eberhardt Hall, NJIT

=== High schools ===
The neighborhood is also home to many high schools (public and private) including:

==== Public ====
- Central High School (moved south to a new campus in the Springfield/Belmont neighborhood)
- Newark Arts High School
- Newark Tech High School
- Science Park High School (Built in 2006)

==== Private ====
- Saint Benedict's Preparatory School, all-boys prep school
- Saint Vincent Academy, all-girls prep school
- St. Patricks School

== See also ==
- Council for Higher Education in Newark
