= Military Park station =

Newark Light Rail station

Military Park
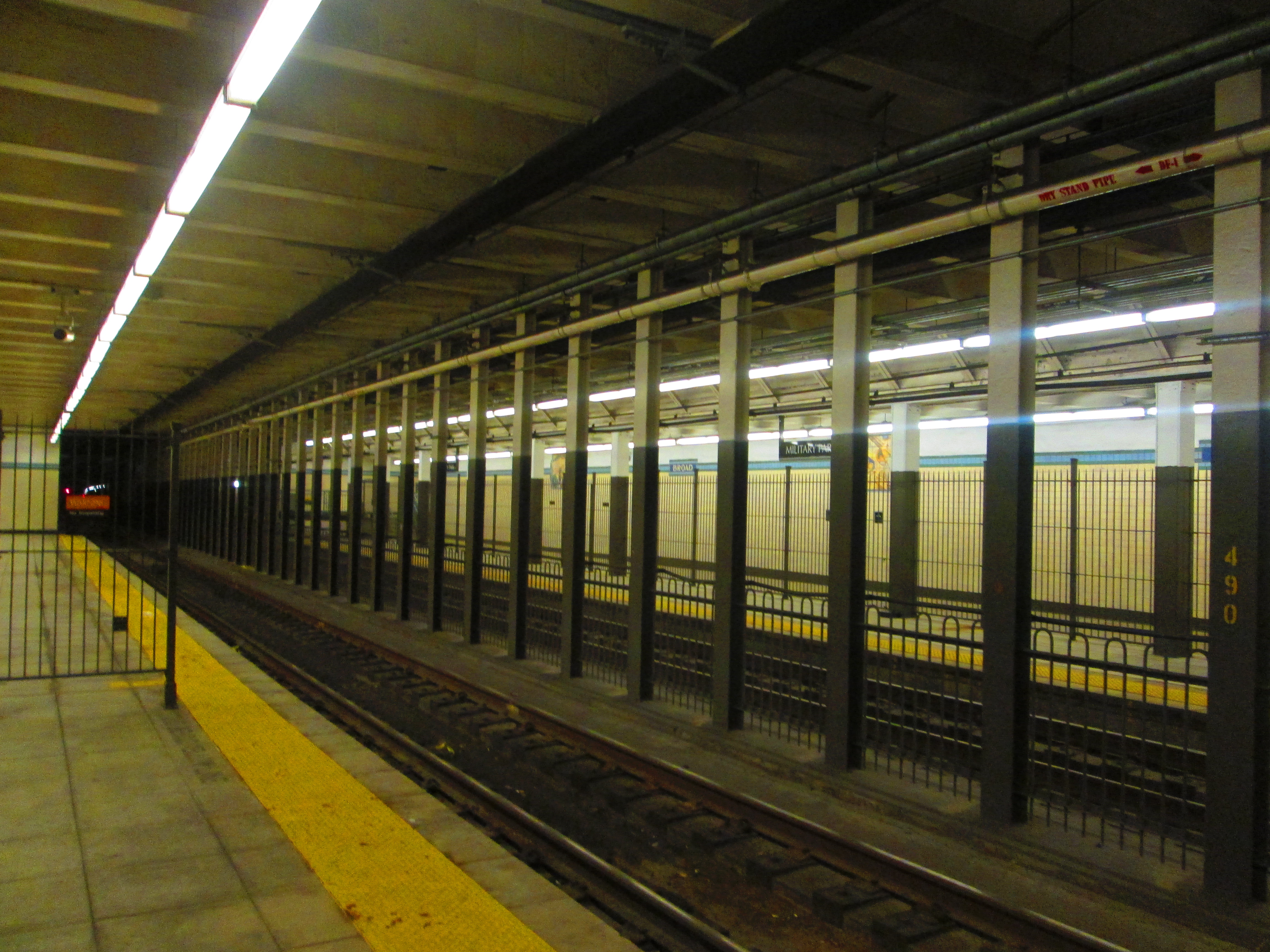
- Military Park station platforms in 2013

General information
- Location: Broad Street at Raymond Boulevard and Park Place; Newark, New Jersey
- Coordinates: 40°44′14″N 74°10′16″W
- Owner: New Jersey Transit
- Platforms: 2 side platforms
- Tracks: 2
- Connections: NJ Transit Bus: 11, 13, 27, 28, go28, 29, 30, 39, 40, 41, 59, 62, 65, 66, 71, 72, 73, 78, 79, 108, 378; ONE Bus: 24, 44

Construction
- Structure type: Underground
- Accessible: No

Other information
- Station code: 30770

History
- Opened: May 26, 1935
- Former names: Broad Street (1935–2004)

Passengers
- 2025: 1,304 (average weekday)
- Rank: 5 of 17

Services
Preceding station	NJ Transit	Following station
Washington Street toward Grove Street	Grove Street – Newark Penn	Newark Penn Terminus
Location

Military Park station (formerly Broad Street station) is an underground station on the Newark City Subway Line of the Newark Light Rail. The station is owned and service is operated by New Jersey Transit. The station is located at the intersection of Raymond Boulevard, Park Place and Broad Street in Downtown Newark at Military Park. The station was opened in 1935 as Broad Street station. It was renamed on September 4, 2004, so only one station in the system would carry the name Broad Street when Downtown Newark's stations (Penn Station and Broad Street) were connected by the Newark Light Rail line. The station is decorated with beige tiles and colored tiles for borders, mosaics and street indicator signs. This station is not wheelchair accessible, but the adjacent stations, Penn Station and Washington Street, are.

== History ==
In 1910, the Public Service Corporation planned to build two subway lines meeting at Broad Street (now Military Park). An additional north–south line would have connected Bridge Street to the north with Clinton Avenue near The Coast/Lincoln Park neighborhood near Lincoln Park. The proposed second segment of the Newark-Elizabeth Rail Link (NERL) together with the first segment, the Newark Light Rail would service this area. The existing Newark City Subway Line was built in the old Morris Canal bed with construction beginning in 1929 and service starting on the line on May 26, 1935.

== Notable places nearby ==
The station is within walking distance of the following notable places:

- Military Park
- New Jersey Historical Society
- Aljira, a Center for Contemporary Art
- Lenape Trail
- One Theater Square
- Prudential Center
- Government Center
- Newark City Hall
