= Warren Street/NJIT station =

Warren St./NJIT
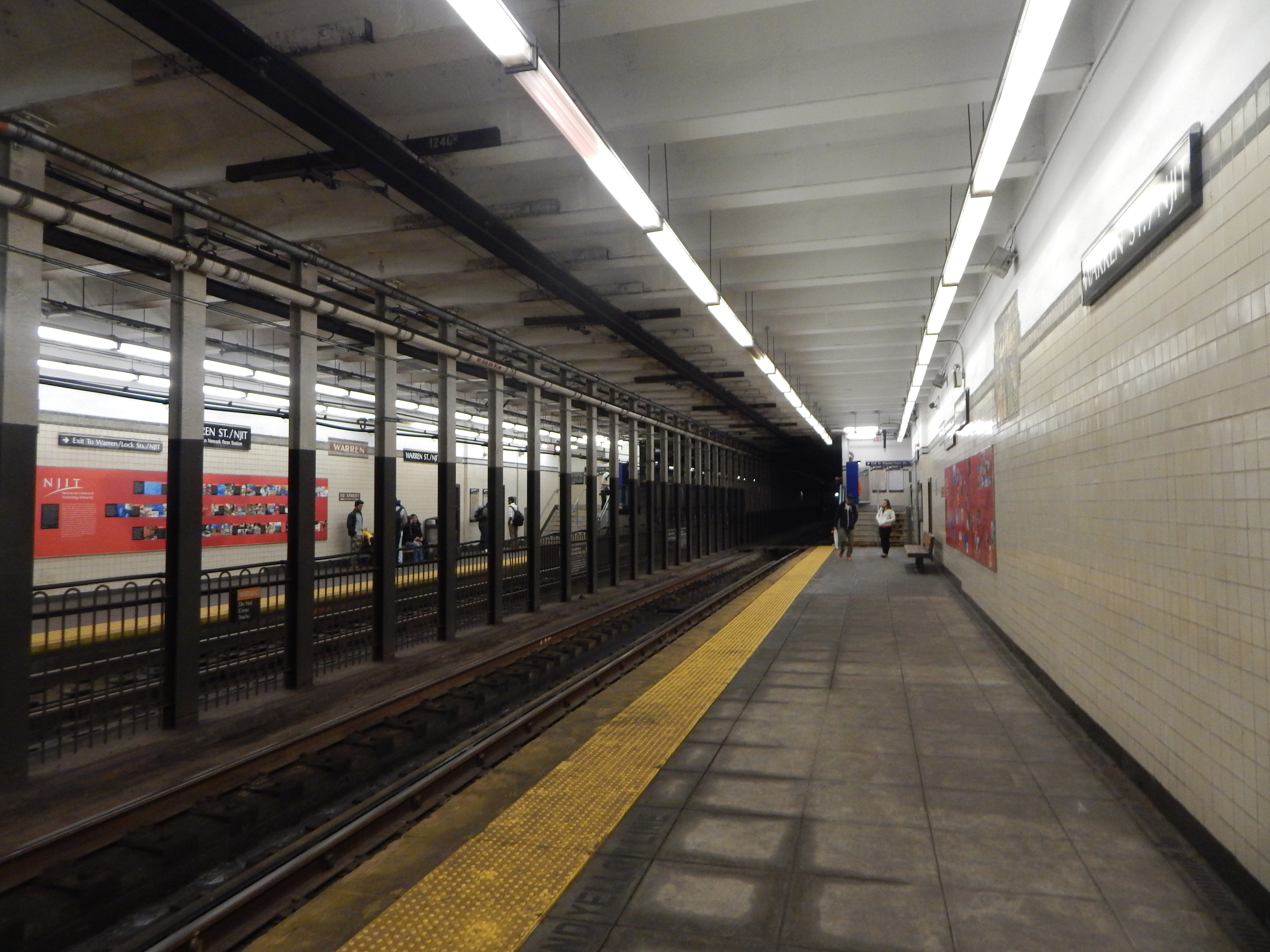
- Warren Street/NJIT station in March 2015

General information
- Location: Lock Street at Warren Street; Newark, New Jersey
- Coordinates: 40°44′33″N 74°10′53″W
- Owner: New Jersey Transit
- Platforms: 2 side platforms
- Tracks: 2
- Connections: NJ Transit Bus: 71, 73, 79

Construction
- Structure type: Underground
- Accessible: No

Other information
- Station code: 30768

History
- Opened: May 26, 1935
- Rebuilt: 2011

Passengers
- 2025: 909 (average weekday)
- Rank: 7 of 17

Services
Preceding station	NJ Transit	Following station
Norfolk Street toward Grove Street	Grove Street – Newark Penn	Washington Street toward Newark Penn
Location

Warren Street/NJIT station is one of four underground stations on the Newark City Subway Line of the Newark Light Rail. It is the furthest station from Downtown Newark that is underground. The station is owned, serviced and operated by New Jersey Transit. The station has entrances on both sides of Lock Street, just north of Warren Street in University Heights. It is decorated with beige tiles and colored tiles for borders, mosaics, and street indicator signs. This station is not wheelchair accessible.

== History ==
In 1910, the Public Service Railway planned to build two subway lines meeting at Broad Street (now Military Park). In 1929 construction began on the east-west subway line (#7), now the Newark Light Rail, which was built in the old Morris Canal bed with Raymond Boulevard built over it, and service started on the line on May 26, 1935, operated by the Public Service Corporation of New Jersey. Additionally, the station contained a connection to the Main Street line until March 30, 1952 when the route was converted into bus route #21.

On March 7, 2011, the station's name was officially changed from Warren Street to Warren Street/NJIT with the help of New Jersey Institute of Technology and its students who initiated (and paid for) the name-change/makeover project.

== Notable places nearby ==
The station is within walking distance of the following notable places:

- New Jersey Institute of Technology (NJIT)
- Essex County College (ECC)
- Rutgers University–Newark
- Eberhardt Hall, New Jersey Institute of Technology
