= Bloomfield Avenue station =

Bloomfield Ave.
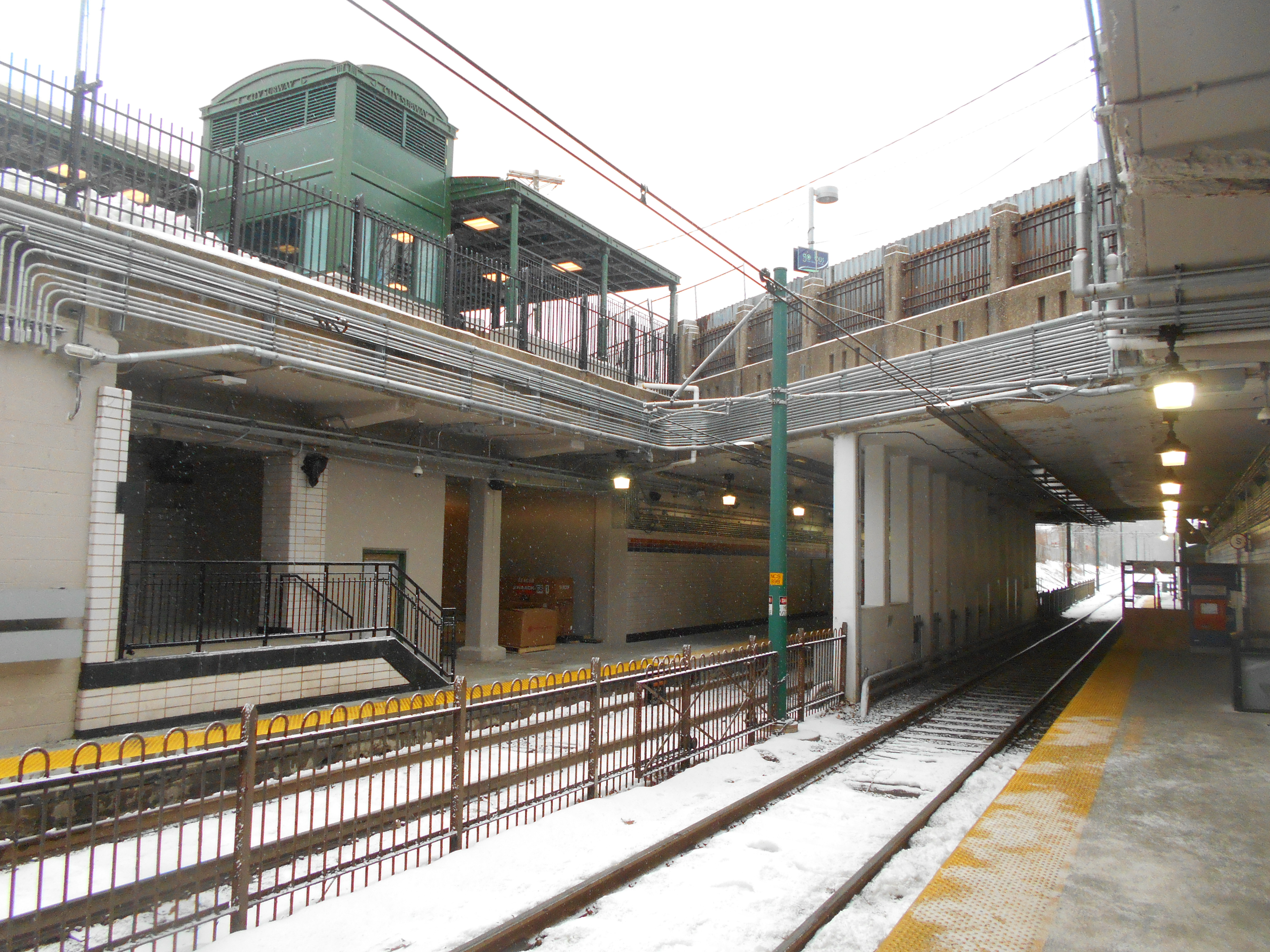
- Bloomfield Avenue station platforms

General information
- Location: 310 Bloomfield Avenue; Newark, New Jersey
- Coordinates: 40°45′56″N 74°10′48″W
- Owner: New Jersey Transit
- Platforms: 2 side platforms
- Tracks: 2
- Connections: NJ Transit Bus: 11, 28, go28, 29, 72

Construction
- Structure type: Below-grade
- Accessible: Yes

Other information
- Station code: 30773

History
- Opened: May 26, 1935

Passengers
- 2025: 1,454 (average weekday)
- Rank: 4 of 17

Services
Preceding station	NJ Transit	Following station
Davenport Avenue toward Grove Street	Grove Street – Newark Penn	Park Avenue toward Newark Penn
Location

Bloomfield Avenue station is an open-cut station on the Newark City Subway Line of the Newark Light Rail, located at Bloomfield Avenue on the west side of Branch Brook Park, near its main entrance. Connections are available here for Bloomfield Avenue bus service on four lines for service between Newark and Paterson, Wayne, Montclair, West Caldwell, and Parsippany-Troy Hills. The station has elevators allowing access to passengers with disabilities.

== History ==
Bloomfield Avenue station was originally built by Public Service Corporation of New Jersey on May 26, 1935, and contained a connection to the Bloomfield Avenue line until March 30, 1952 when the route was converted into bus route no. 29.
