= Park Avenue station (Newark Light Rail) =

Park Avenue
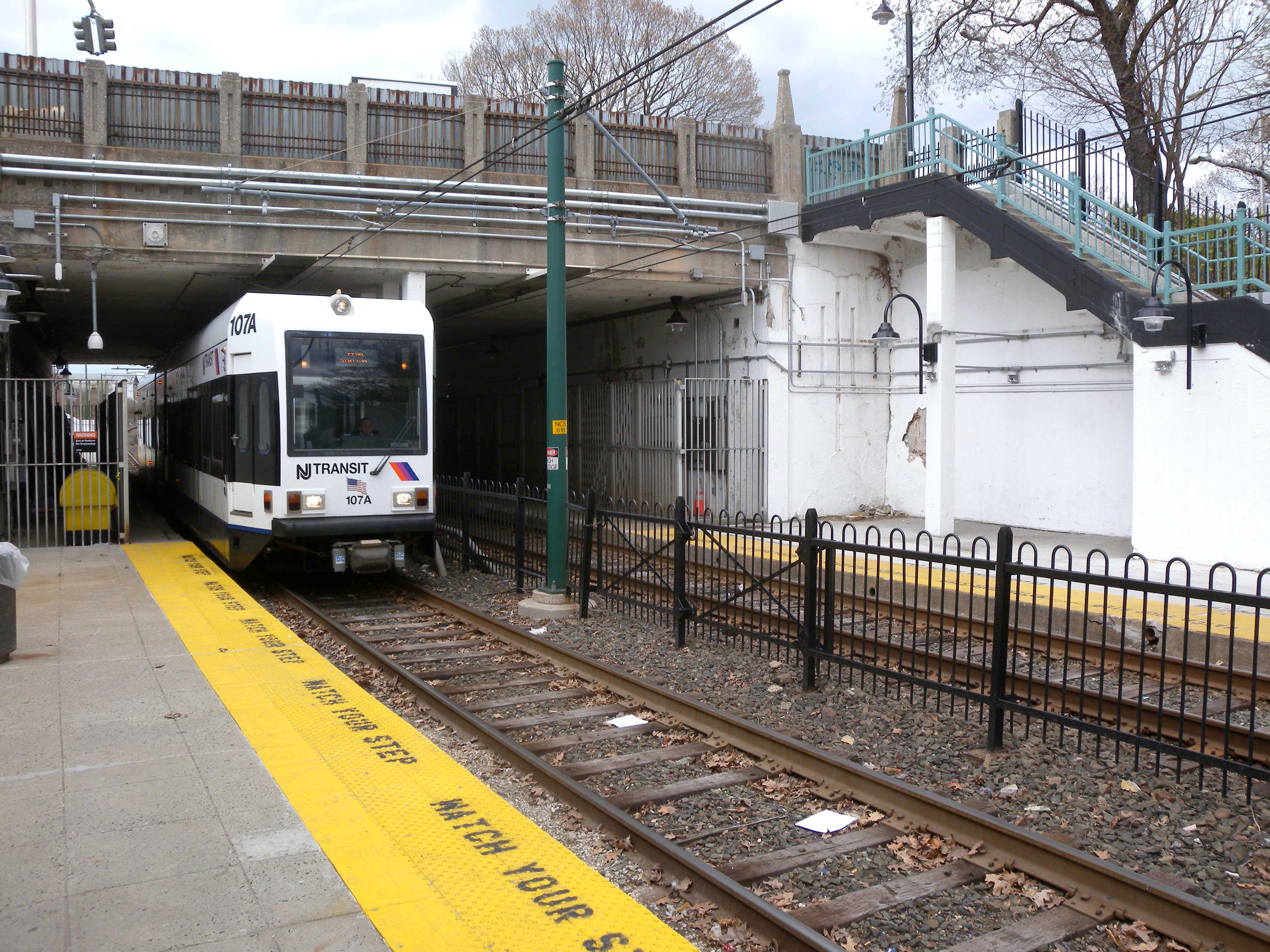
- Park Avenue station platforms

General information
- Location: Park Avenue and North Fourth Street; Newark, New Jersey
- Coordinates: 40°45′30″N 74°11′06″W
- Owner: New Jersey Transit
- Platforms: 2 side platforms
- Tracks: 2
- Connections: NJ Transit Bus: 41

Construction
- Structure type: Below-grade
- Accessible: No

Other information
- Station code: 30765

History
- Opened: May 26, 1935

Passengers
- 2025: 1,572 (average weekday)
- Rank: 3 of 17

Services
Preceding station	NJ Transit	Following station
Bloomfield Avenue toward Grove Street	Grove Street – Newark Penn	Orange Street toward Newark Penn
Location

Park Avenue station is an open-cut station on the Newark City Subway Line of the Newark Light Rail, located at Park Avenue east of North Fourth Street, and the first (i.e. southernmost) station located on the west side of Branch Brook Park. The station is also near two smaller parks on the opposite side of the tracks.

== Gallery ==
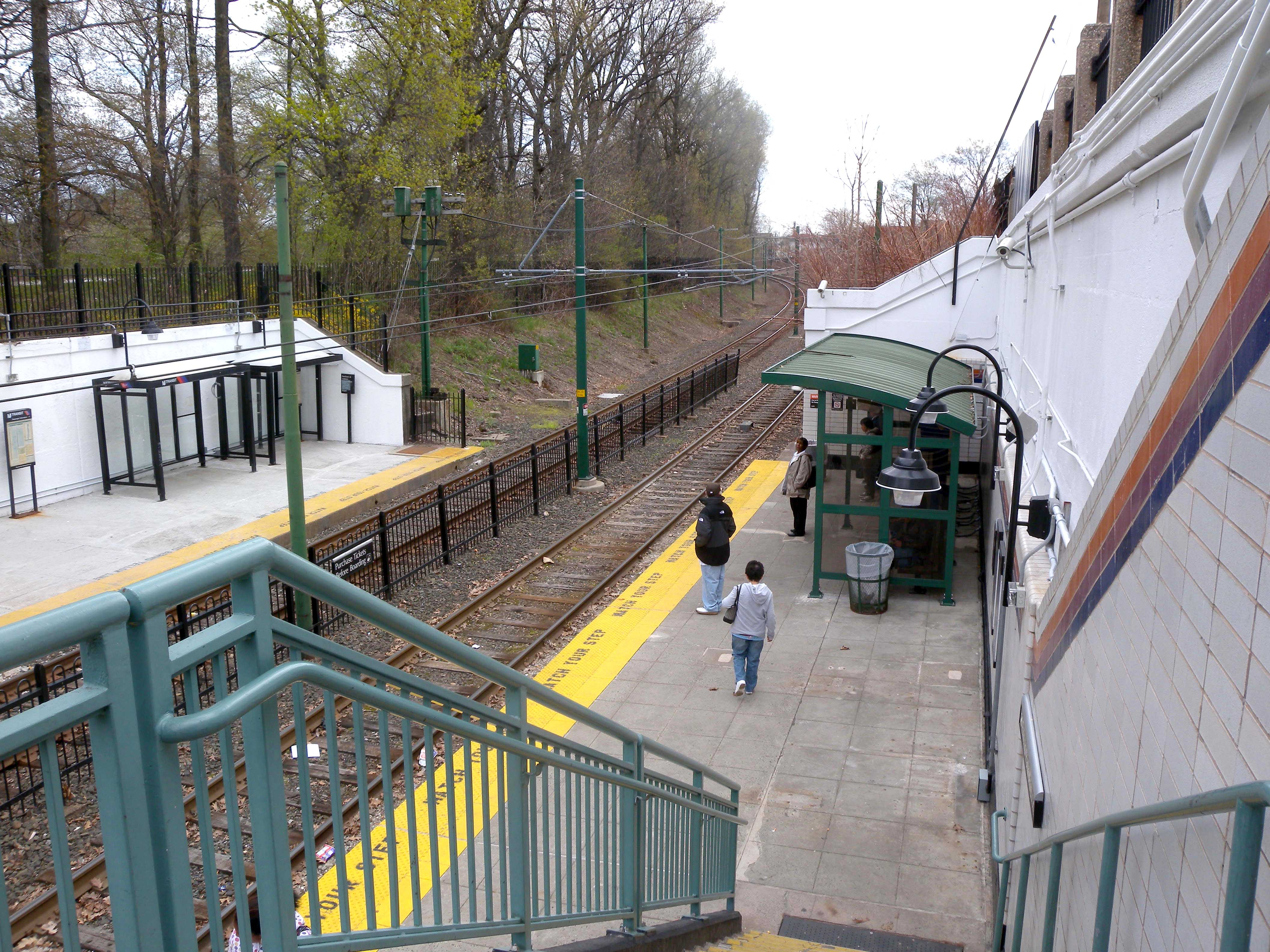
Looking down towards the platform

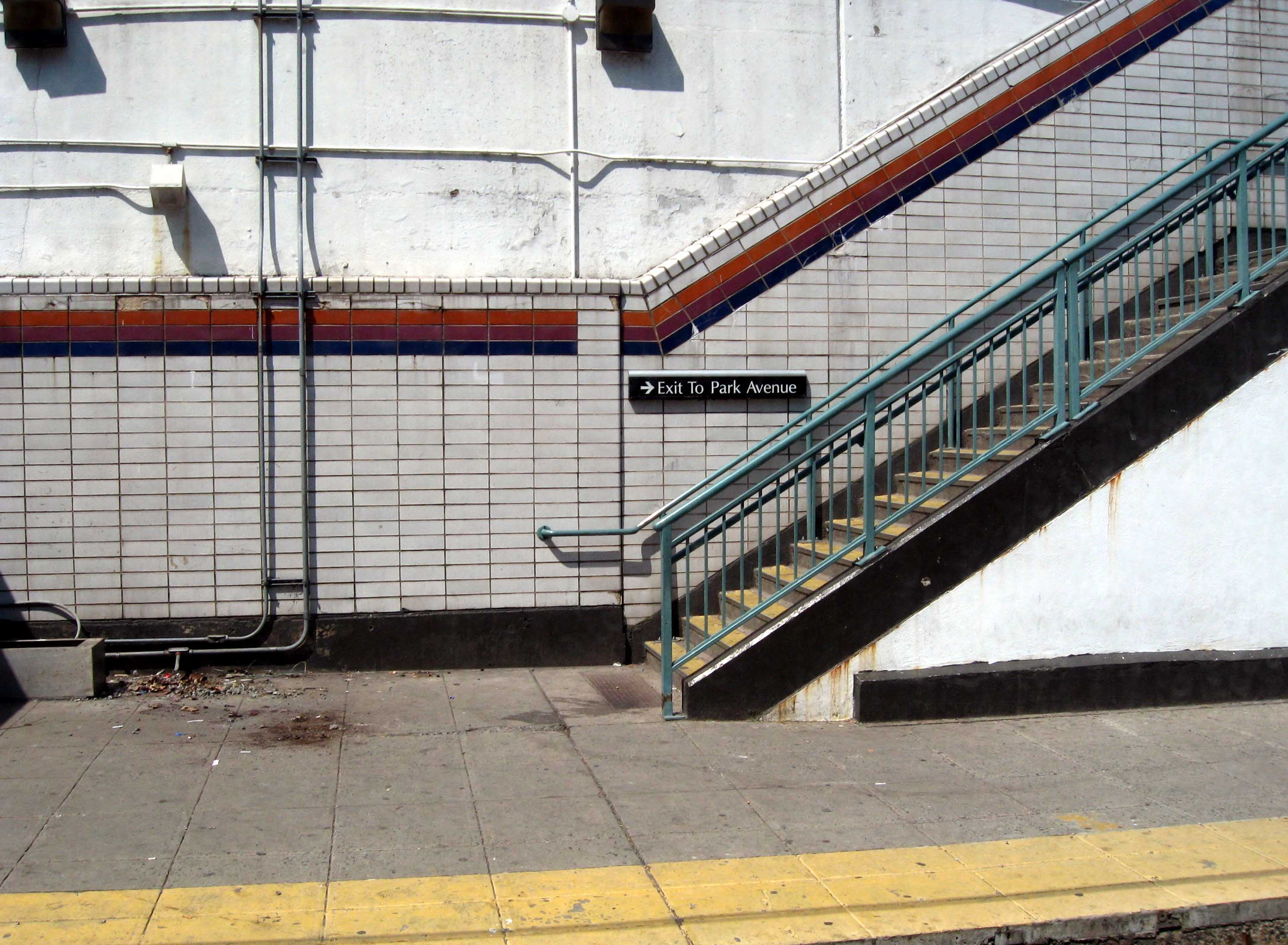
The staircase nearby as seen from the platform.
