= Washington Street station (Newark Light Rail) =

Newark Light Rail station

Washington Street
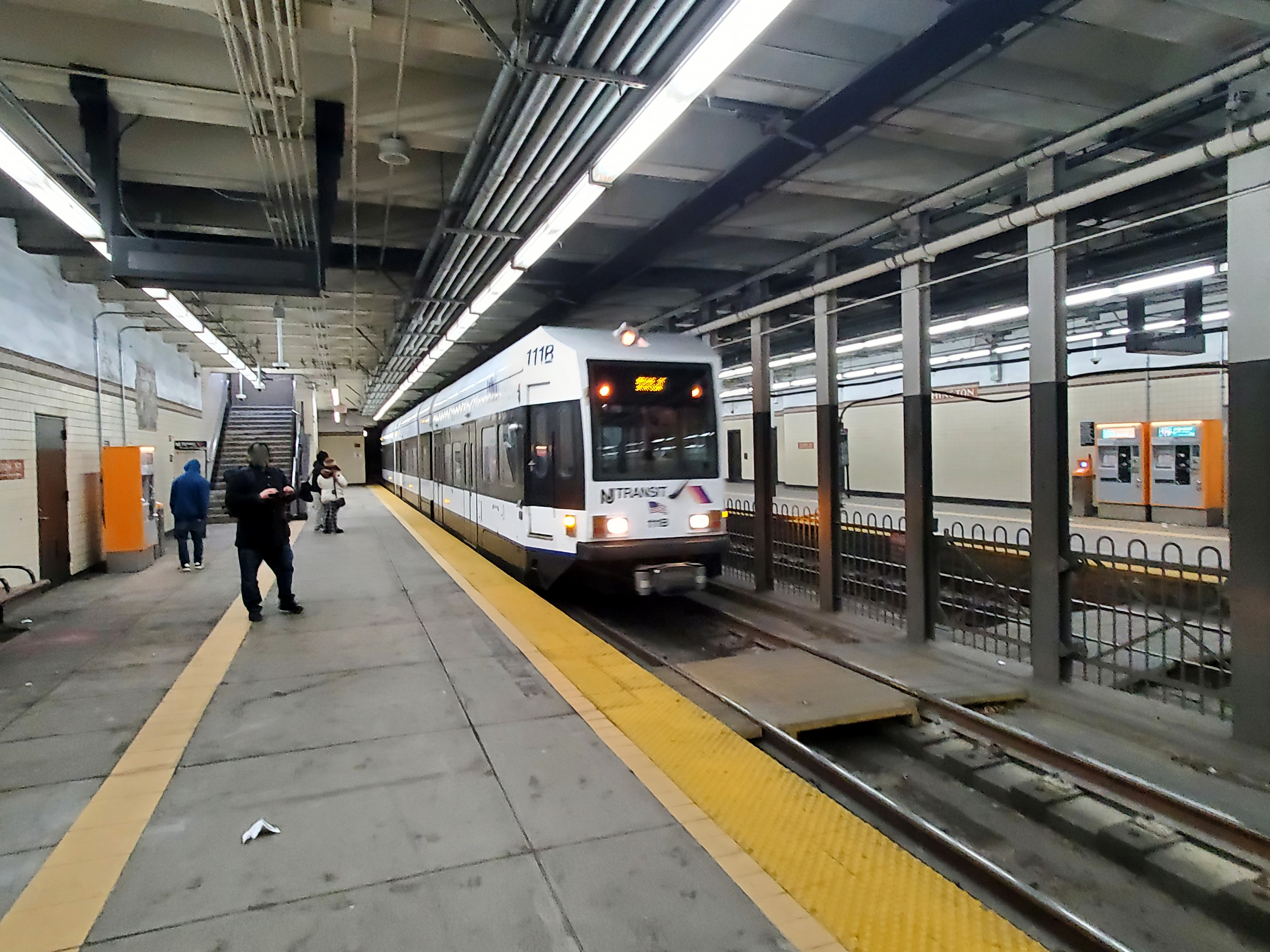
- A westbound train at the station in 2024

General information
- Location: University Avenue at Washington Street; Newark, New Jersey
- Coordinates: 40°44′18″N 74°10′27″W
- Owner: New Jersey Transit
- Platforms: 2 side platforms
- Tracks: 2
- Connections: NJ Transit Bus: 11, 28, 29, 30, 41, 70, 71, 72, 73, 76, 78, 79

Construction
- Structure type: Underground
- Accessible: Yes

Other information
- Station code: 30769

History
- Opened: May 26, 1935

Passengers
- 2025: 849 (average weekday)
- Rank: 9 of 17

Services
Preceding station	NJ Transit	Following station
Warren Street/NJIT toward Grove Street	Grove Street – Newark Penn	Military Park toward Newark Penn
Location

Washington Street station is an underground station on the Newark City Subway Line of the Newark Light Rail. The station is owned and service is operated by New Jersey Transit. The station is located at the intersection of Raymond Boulevard and Washington Street with a second entrance at University Avenue, both in Downtown Newark. The station serves the western edge of downtown and the University Heights neighborhood. The station was opened in 1935. The station is decorated with beige tiles and colored tiles for borders, mosaics and street indicator signs. Some mosaic street indicators still show the exit for "Plane Street" which is the previous name for University Avenue. This station is wheelchair accessible.

== History ==
In 1910, the Public Service Corporation planned to build two subway lines meeting at Broad Street (now Military Park). In 1929 construction began on the east-west subway line (#7), now the Newark Light Rail, which was built in the old Morris Canal bed with Raymond Boulevard built over it, and service started on the line on May 26, 1935.
