= Orange Street station (Newark Light Rail) =

Newark Light Rail station

Orange Street
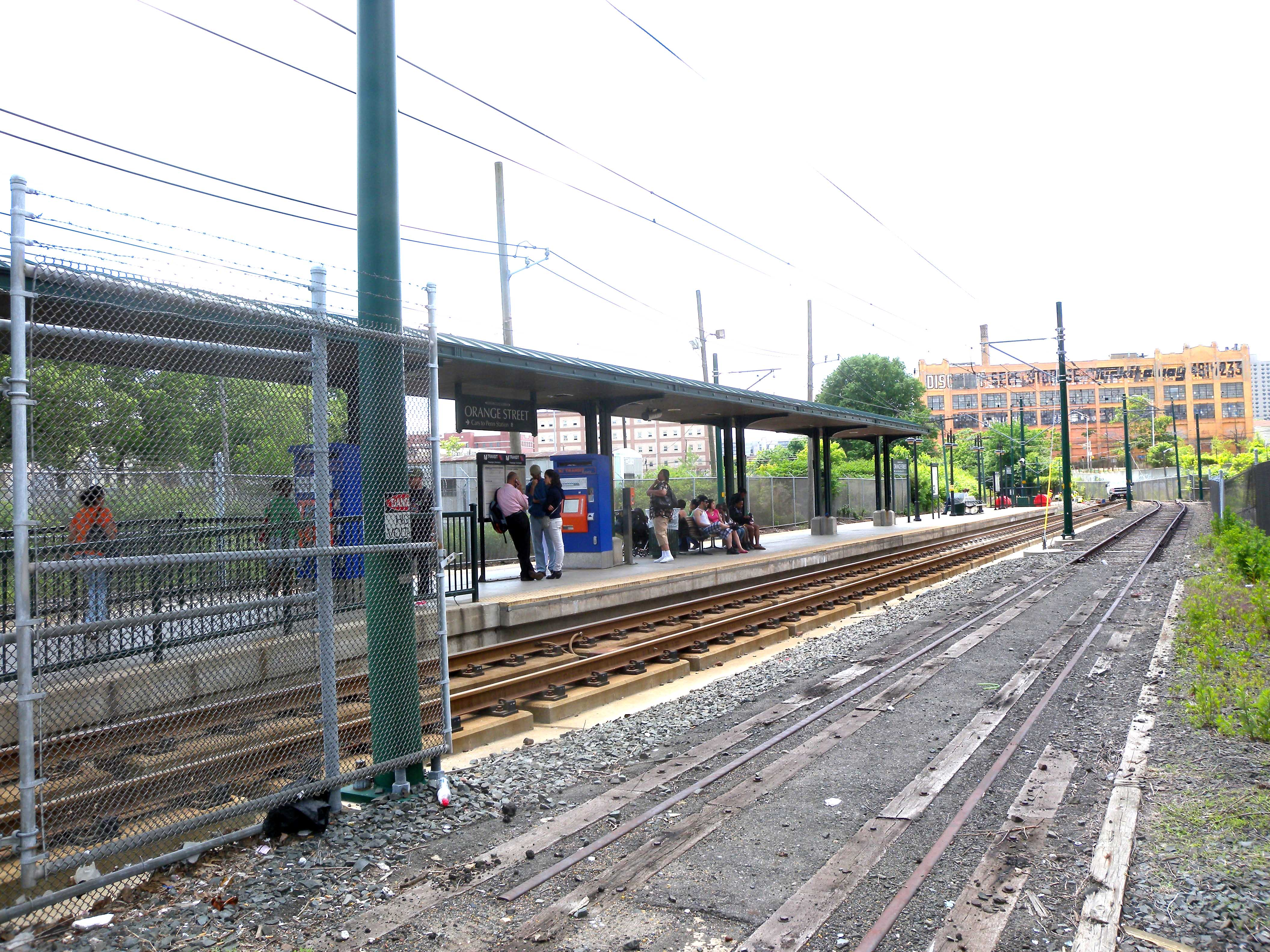
- Orange Street station south from the street toward Penn Station

General information
- Location: Orange Street between First and Duryea Streets; Newark, New Jersey
- Coordinates: 40°45′02″N 74°11′06″W
- Owner: New Jersey Transit
- Platforms: 1 island platform
- Tracks: 2
- Connections: NJ Transit Bus: 29, 71, 73

Construction
- Structure type: At-grade
- Accessible: Yes

Other information
- Station code: 30766

History
- Opened: May 26, 1935

Passengers
- 2025: 1,200 (average weekday)
- Rank: 6 of 17

Services
Preceding station	NJ Transit	Following station
Park Avenue toward Grove Street	Grove Street – Newark Penn	Norfolk Street toward Newark Penn
Location

Orange Street station is a surface-level light rail stop in the Roseville section of Newark, New Jersey. A stop on the Newark City Subway line of the Newark Light Rail, Orange Street is a single island platform stop on the south side of the eponymous street between First Street and Duryea Street. The stop is next to interchange 13 on Interstate 280 and serves the southern end of Branch Brook Park in Newark. The next station north is Park Avenue and the next station south is Norfolk Street. The station is accessible for handicapped persons as part of the Americans with Disabilities Act of 1990, with access at Orange Street from the sidewalk.

Orange Street station opened on May 26, 1935 as part of the original Newark City Subway, a service between Heller Parkway station and Broad Street station (modern-day Military Park). The station was built just eight blocks east of the Delaware, Lackawanna and Western Railroad's Roseville Avenue station, which closed on September 16, 1984.

== History ==
The station was originally built by Public Service Corporation of New Jersey on May 26, 1935, and contained a connection to the Main Street line until March 30, 1952, when the route was converted into bus route no. 21.
