= Norfolk Street station =

Light rail station in Newark, New Jersey, United States

Norfolk Street
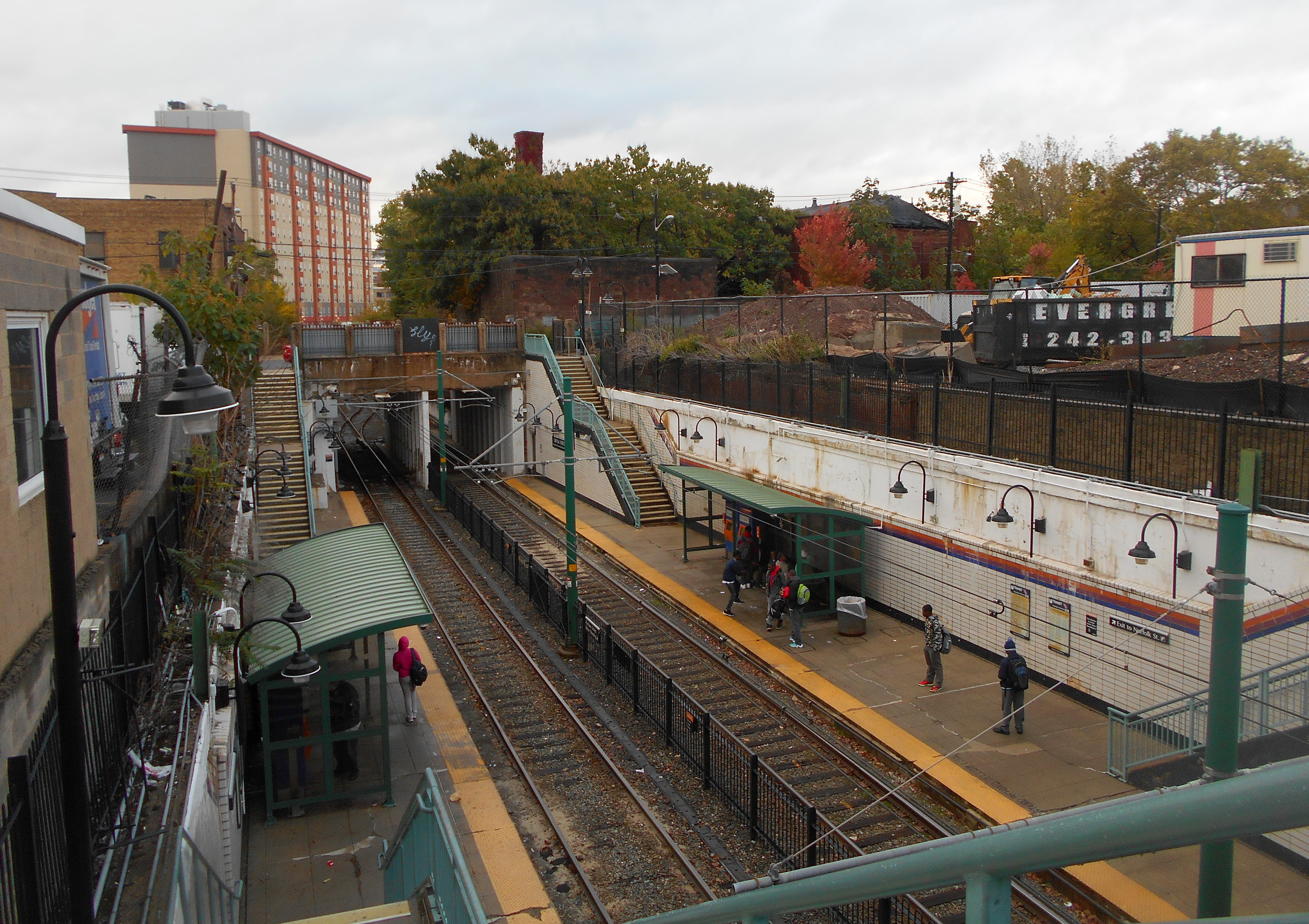
- Norfolk Street station in October 2014

General information
- Location: Norfolk Street & Bond Street; Newark, New Jersey
- Coordinates: 40°44′43″N 74°10′59″W
- Owner: New Jersey Transit
- Platforms: 2 side platforms
- Tracks: 2
- Connections: NJ Transit Bus: 24, 44, 99

Construction
- Structure type: Below grade
- Accessible: No

History
- Opened: May 26, 1935

Passengers
- 2025: 874 (average weekday)
- Rank: 8 of 17

Services
Preceding station	NJ Transit	Following station
Orange Street toward Grove Street	Grove Street – Newark Penn	Warren Street/NJIT toward Newark Penn
Location

Norfolk Street station is an open-cut station on the Newark City Subway Line of the Newark Light Rail, and the first following the line leaving the Raymond Boulevard tunnel. It is located on Norfolk Street just south of Central Avenue in University Heights.

Norfolk Street station was originally built by Public Service Corporation of New Jersey on May 26, 1935, and contained a connection to the Central Avenue line until December 14, 1947 when the route was converted into bus route #23.
