= Public Service Corporation =

Energy and rail transport company in New Jersey

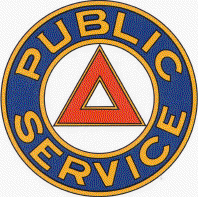
Public Service Logo

The Public Service Corporation (PSC) was an energy and transportation company in New Jersey. It was formed to shore up financing and development of New Jersey's streetcar and power companies at a time when they were growing but exhausting capital. It did this by leasing their operations or buying them outright, and using the size and integration of the systems to get favorable financing for improvements.

Its energy utility became the Public Service Electric and Gas Company. Its transportation business became the nucleus of New Jersey Transit's bus network, along with the Newark subway system.

== History ==
=== Formation ===
In the 1890s, gas lighting was a mature business with small technological advancing growth, but new competition from electricity. Streetcar companies were also well established, but the disjointed network limited the operators, reduced profits, and made it difficult to finance improvements. Some were losing money. Similarly, the electrification of the state had proceeded rapidly, but in a disjointed, local fashion, that sometimes caused financing difficulties for the operators. especially as technological improvements required constant capital.

In the 1880s and 1890s, United Gas Improvement of Pennsylvania had developed a model of operating or owning local gas providers. It decided to expand the model to New Jersey, and made a deal in 1899 with several power utilities there to merge into a holding company it formed, United Electric Company of New Jersey. UGI's consolidation strategy served as prototype for large consolidation efforts, which would cover broad portions of New Jersey utility operations, as well as streetcar operation (whose own power generation needs or operations were a natural fit for the electric company consolidation, aside from the pressing need to improve the financial stability of streetcar companies).

PSC was formed May 6, 1903. It was initially a merger of four trolley companies and a power company serving Passaic, Hudson, Bergen and Essex counties. It quickly continued consolidating gas, electric and trolley companies throughout much of New Jersey, eventually over 400 being combined.

Initially, PSC did not necessarily buy its consolidation target companies (whether transportation or power) outright. Instead, it often obtained very long term lease agreements (typically 900 years) with them for their plants, and often bought large stakes in the companies and took over their boards of directors. By 1928, this arrangement was deemed to be cumbersome and complicated for financing efforts. PSC would use its influence via shared boards of directors to merge the other utilities outright into one of its holding companies, exchanging third parties' shares for PSC preferred stock.

=== Organization ===
In its early years, the company had five primary operating subsidiaries:

- Public Service Railway Company for streetcars and the Newark subway
- Public Service Gas Company
- Public Service Electric Company
- Public Service Transportation Company, for passenger buses, formed a bit later than the others (started 1917)
- United Electric Company of New Jersey (merged 1907)

All of these were holding companies, except for the bus company. United Electric was a special case. As mentioned above, it had predated Public Service, having been formed in 1899 to consolidate local electric companies in Essex, Hudson, Passaic, Bergen, Morris, Union, and Middlesex counties (some accounts leave out some of the counties). PSC leased United's operations in 1907, but did not consolidate it into Public Service Electric Company, keeping it as a direct subsidiary of Public Service

By 1928, the five were merged into two:

- Public Service Electric & Gas Company (including United Electric), 1924
- Public Service Coordinated Transport, merging the streetcar and bus subsidiaries, later renamed Transport of New Jersey (TNJ)

=== Operations ===
Within a few years of formation of PSE, with the consolidation of dozens of component companies, rates were significantly reduced for utilities across most service areas, and trolley transportation became less expensive per trip, especially with free transfers across PSE's nine purchased lines.

The transportation division originally operated only streetcars. The electric transmission network powering the streetcars was a natural fit for the energy operations when the company was formed. In 1917, Public Service began adding bus routes. The streetcar division was called Public Service Railway Company (Public Service Railways), while the bus division was called Public Service Transportation Company. The two divisions were merged in 1928 to create Public Service Coordinated Transport.

In 1935, Public Service began experimenting with All Service Vehicles, trolleys that were adaptable to both rail and road use, using electric service or gas engines. This began the demise of streetcars, with buses taking over their routes. By 1948, Public Service had stopped using the All Service Vehicles in favor of standard buses.

In 1948, Public Service Corporation dissolved. PSE&G went from being a subsidiary to an independent public company. This helped resolve federal and state antitrust concerns.

In 1971, Public Service Coordinated Transport was renamed to Transport of New Jersey (TNJ).

In the late 1970s, the state began to assess gaps in its commuter network, partly as many large rail companies had failed and been taken over by Conrail. The department of transportation formed a new company, New Jersey Transit, in 1979. It began to buy up bus companies, and purchased Transport of New Jersey in 1980. This ended PSE&G's role as a transportation provider, and it became exclusively an energy utility.

In 1985, a new holding company, Public Service Enterprise Group, Inc. formed. The new holding company absorbed PSE&G and formed a second, non-utility subsidiary not subject to utility regulations, Enterprise Diversified Holdings, Inc.
