= Newark Light Rail =

Light rail system in New Jersey

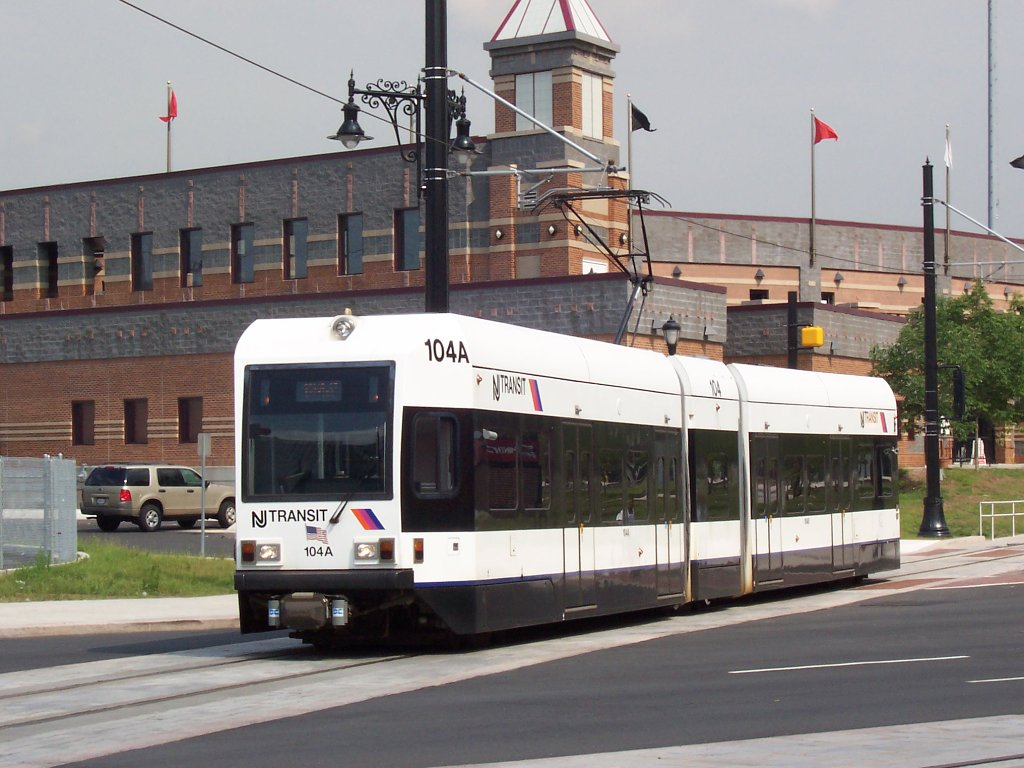
- A Newark Light Rail train crosses Broad Street by Bears & Eagles Riverfront Stadium in Newark, New Jersey

Overview
- Owner: New Jersey Transit
- Locale: Essex County
- Termini: Newark Penn Station; Grove Street (City Subway Line) Newark Broad Street (Broad Street Extension)
- Stations: 17
- Website: njtransit.com

Service
- Type: Light rail
- System: New Jersey Transit
- Services: 2
- Operator: New Jersey Transit Bus Operations
- Rolling stock: 21 Kinki Sharyo LRVs
- Ridership: 5,100,000 (FY2025)

History
- Opened: May 26, 1935 (City Subway); July 17, 2006 (Broad Street Extension)

Technical
- Line length: 6.2 mi (10.0 km)
- Track gauge: 4 ft 8 1/2 in (1,435 mm) standard gauge
- Minimum radius: 33 ft (10.058 m)
- Electrification: Overhead line, 750 V DC
- Operating speed: 50 mph (80 km/h)
Route map
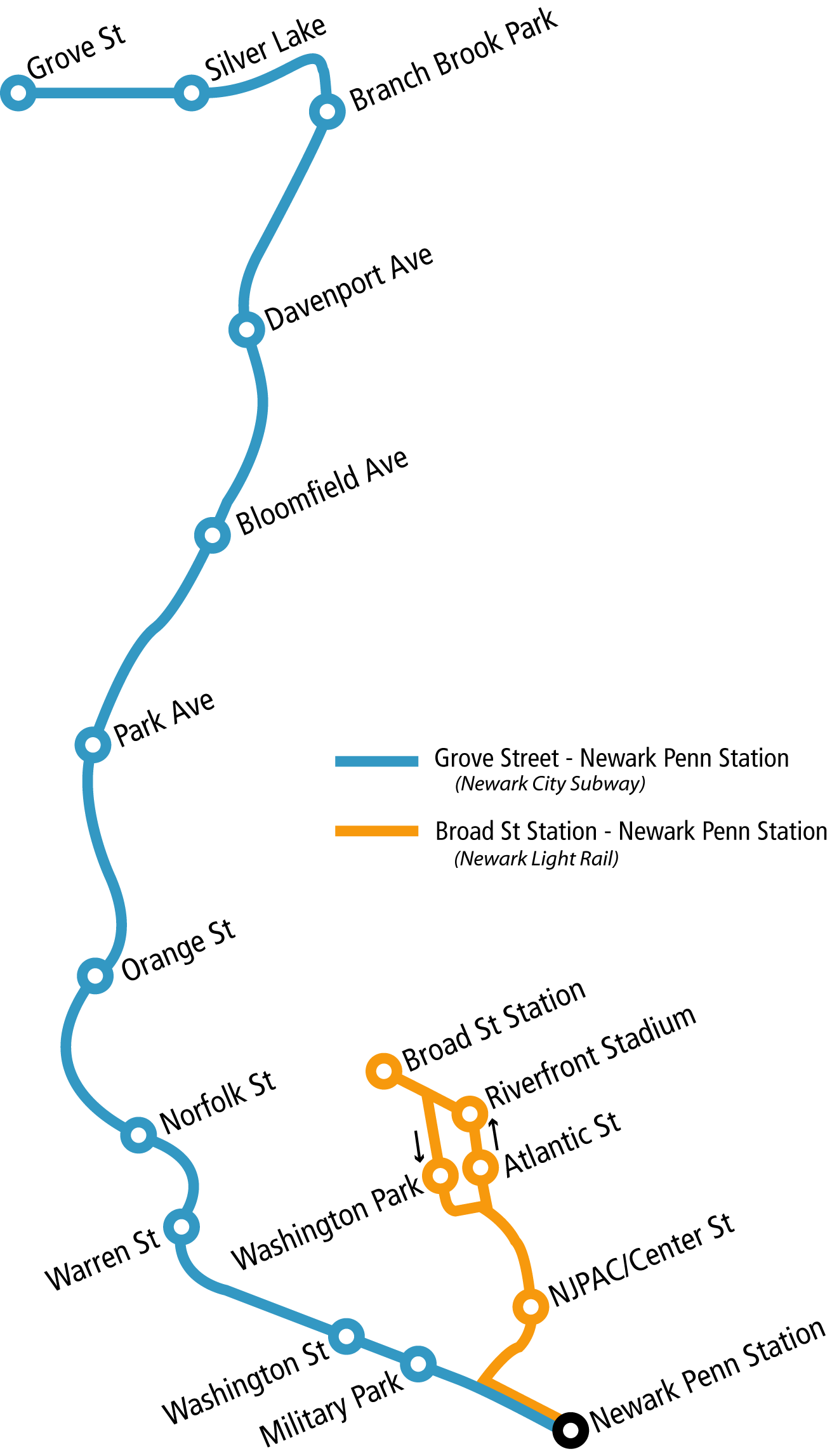
Key

The Newark Light Rail (NLR) is a light rail system serving Newark, New Jersey, and surrounding areas, owned by New Jersey Transit and operated by its bus operations division. The service consists of two segments, the original Newark City Subway (NCS), and the extension to Broad Street station. A separate tunnel serviced the Public Service Terminal. The Cedar Street subway opened in 1916, the City Subway opened on May 26, 1935, and the combined Newark Light Rail service was officially inaugurated on July 17, 2006.

== Newark City Subway ==
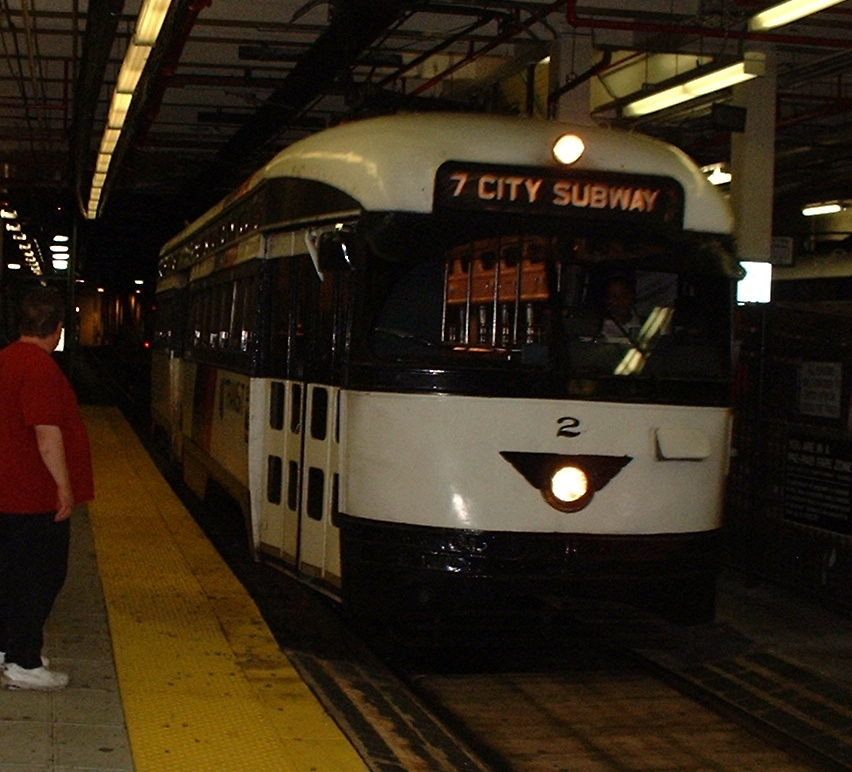
PCC streetcar at Newark Penn Station in 2001, signed as 7 City Subway.

The Newark City Subway is the longer and older of the two segments. It is a "subway–surface" line which runs underground from Penn Station to Warren Street, and above-ground north of Warren Street. Before becoming a part of the Newark Light Rail service, it was also known as the #7-City Subway line, an NJT Bus Operations route number carried over from its days when it was part of Public Service's Transport of New Jersey subsidiary. The number still applies internally. During subway system closures, replacement buses would also bear the route number "7 City Subway".

The segment is 5.3 mi (8.5 km) long and runs between Grove Street in Bloomfield and Newark Penn Station, a major transportation hub with connections to the PATH rapid transit system to Manhattan, multiple bus routes, and both Amtrak and New Jersey Transit Rail Operations trains.

=== History ===
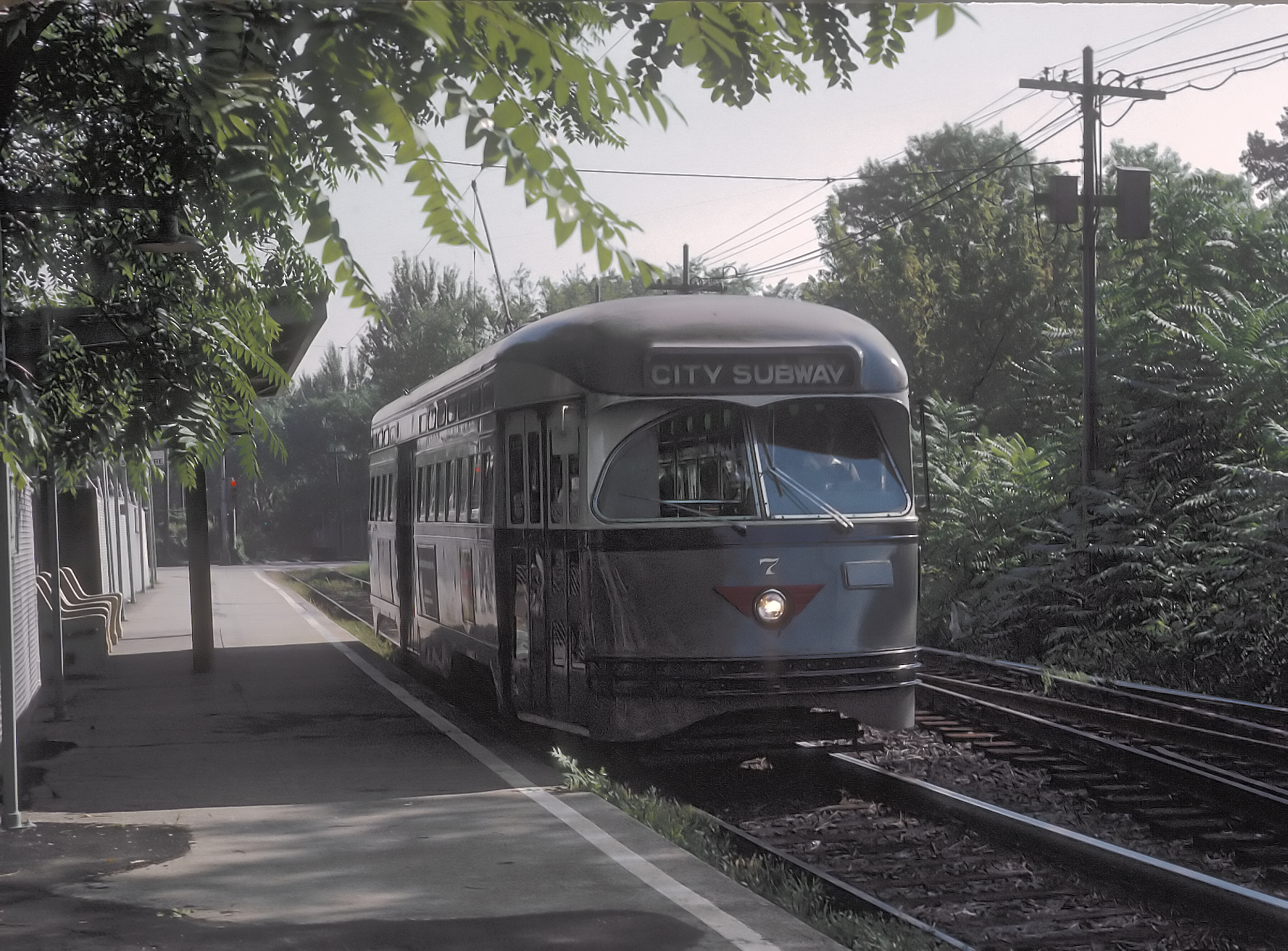
Newark City Subway leaving Park Street station on September 3, 1965

The line opened in 1935 along the old Morris Canal right-of-way, from Broad Street (now known as Military Park) to Heller Parkway (now replaced by the nearby Branch Brook Park station). Works Progress Administration artists decorated the underground stations with Art Deco scenes from life on the defunct Morris Canal. The southernmost part, south of Warren Street, was capped with a new road, known as Raymond Boulevard. Only one grade crossing was present on the original subway; the line crosses Orange Street at grade so it can pass over the below-grade Delaware, Lackawanna and Western Railroad (now NJT Morristown Line) immediately to the north. The original Newark City Subway line had its own right-of-way and did not share city streets with local traffic, except at the Orange Street grade crossing.

Operation of the complete subway to the newly built Penn Station was delayed until 1937. The terminal below Penn Station has five tracks, two incoming and three outgoing, connected by two loop tracks. This part of the subway included a grade-separated junction with a connection to the lower level of the Newark Public Service Terminal that was used for only a few months (June to September).

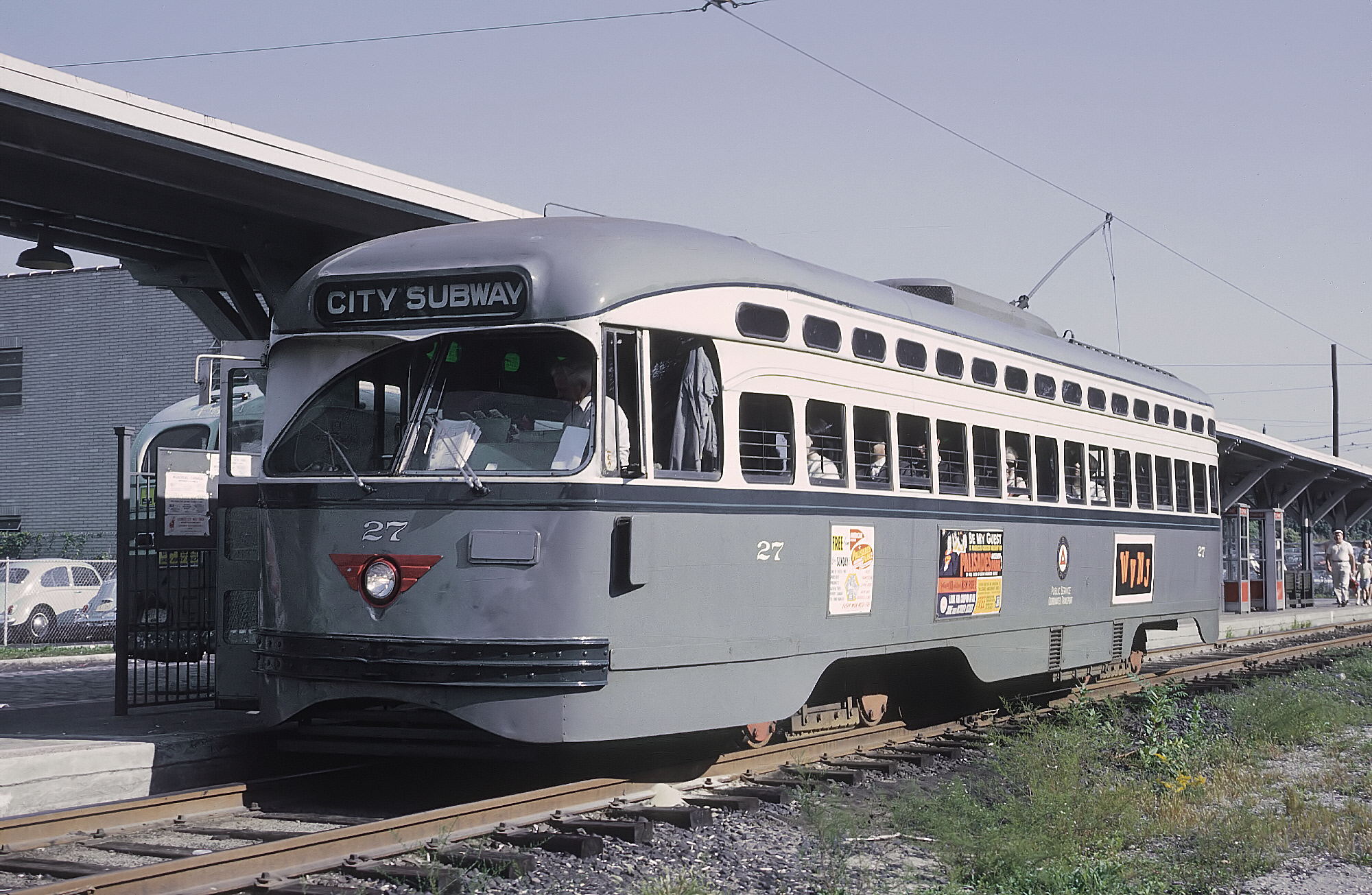
Newark City Subway at the Franklin Avenue station, 1965

An extension to a wooden station at North 6th Street or Franklin Avenue was opened in 1940, located north of the present Branch Brook Park station. In 1953 the line was cut back about one block to accommodate construction of a turning loop, and a new station, still called Franklin Avenue, was opened adjacent to Anthony Street. The station was enlarged in 2002 and renamed Branch Brook Park.

The subway was operated by Transport of New Jersey (formerly Public Service Coordinated Transport) as its No. 7 line. Other streetcar routes used parts of the subway, reaching street trackage at the locations shown below, ending as each route was closed and replaced by bus service:

- Public Service Terminal connection (and Cedar Street Subway), 1937 only: #13 Broad, #17 Paterson, #27 Mount Prospect, #43 Jersey City
- Warren Street ramp, 1935–1951: #21 Orange—West Orange via Market Street
- Central Avenue ramp, 1935–1947: #23 Central
- Orange Street crossing, 1935–1952: #21 Orange—West Orange via Orange Street
- Bloomfield Avenue ramp, 1935–1952: #29 Bloomfield

Until June 5, 1952, the Roseville Car House, on the south side of Main Street (on the No. 21 line) near the eastern city line of East Orange, was used for the No. 7 line. From that time until 2002, Newark Penn Station was used for storage and maintenance. A new shops and yard complex opened at the end of the extension to Grove Street.

Starting in January 1954, 30 PCC streetcars bought from Twin City Rapid Transit provided all service on the route. They were single-ended, requiring construction of a new turning loop at the Franklin Avenue terminal. The cars had been built 1946–1949 by the St. Louis Car Company and were sold by TCRT when that system went through a conversion to buses. Four cars were scrapped over the years, and two were sold to Shaker Heights Rapid Transit in 1978.

In the 1970s, several extensions were proposed but never built. Plans included a $116 million tunnel under Springfield Avenue from Washington Street station to the Irvington Bus Terminal. The line would've featured seven new stations with high-level platforms able to accommodate 73 feet (22 m) long trains. Other proposed extensions would've been to Paterson along the former Erie Railroad right-of-way in the North Ward, the Meadowlands Sports Complex and to Port Newark and Elizabeth through the Ironbound along the former Newark and New York Branch of the Central Railroad of New Jersey.

New Jersey Transit took over operations in 1980.

In 2001, new light rail cars built by Kinki Sharyo in Japan in 1999 replaced the PCCs. The last day of PCC service was August 24, 2001.

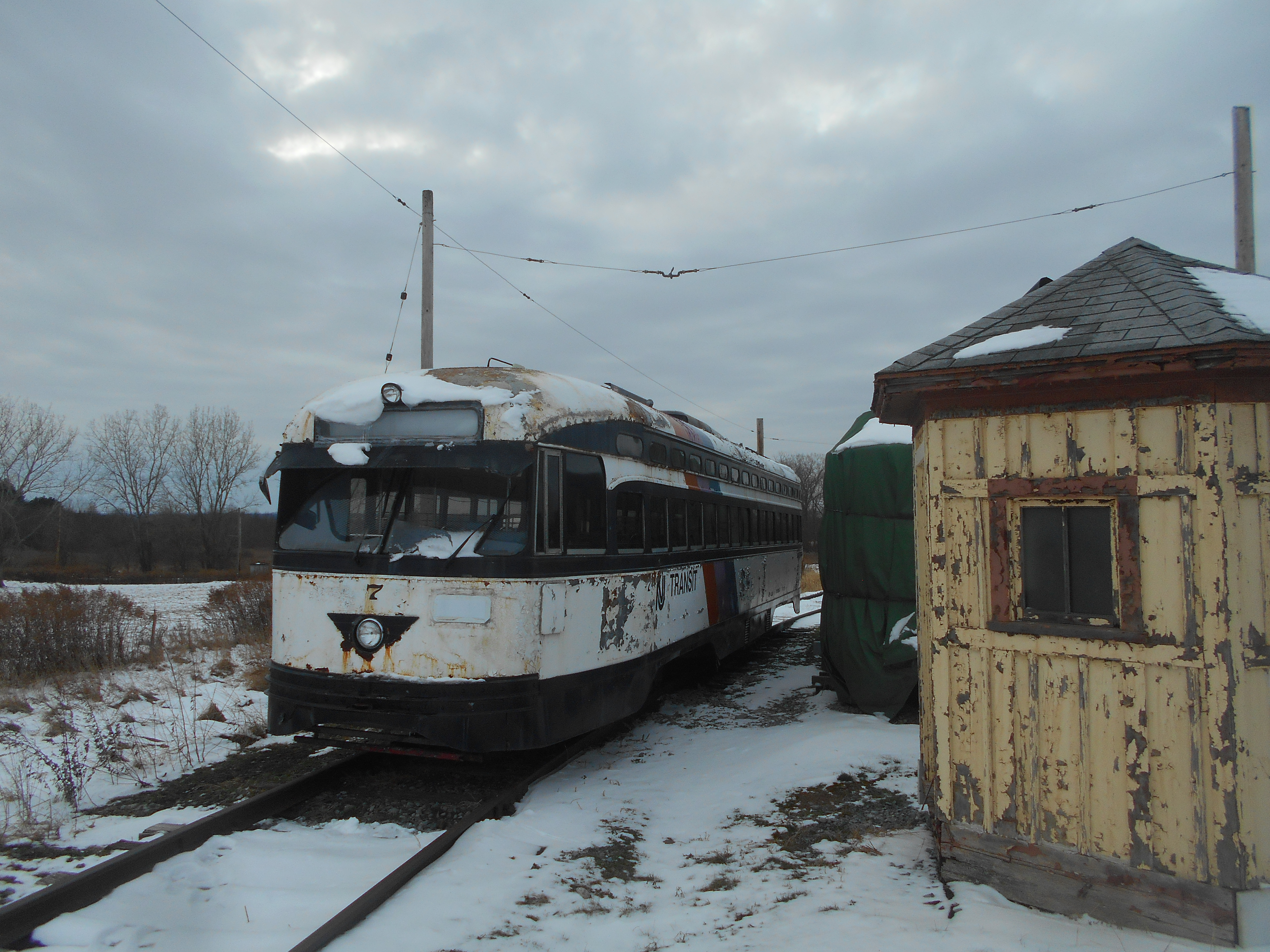
The former PCC railcar No. 7 from the subway located on the property of the New York Museum of Transportation

Some of the PCCs are stored in the Newark City Subway shop. Eleven were sold in 2004 to the San Francisco Municipal Railway for use on its F Market heritage streetcar line. One PCC, #15, was delivered to the Connecticut Trolley Museum in 2013 for restoration and display. One of the Shaker Heights cars has been restored by the Minnesota Transportation Museum, which operates it on a short stretch of track in western Minneapolis.

In 2005, eight PCCs were given to the City of Bayonne to be rehabilitated and operated along a proposed 2.5-mile (4 km) loop to serve the Peninsula at Bayonne Harbor, formerly Military Ocean Terminal at Bayonne (MOTBY). The proposed line would be connected to the 34th Street station of the Hudson-Bergen Light Rail.

On September 4, 2004, Broad Street Station was renamed Military Park Station, to avoid confusion with the terminal of the new route to the Newark Broad Street Station at University Avenue, operated by New Jersey Transit.

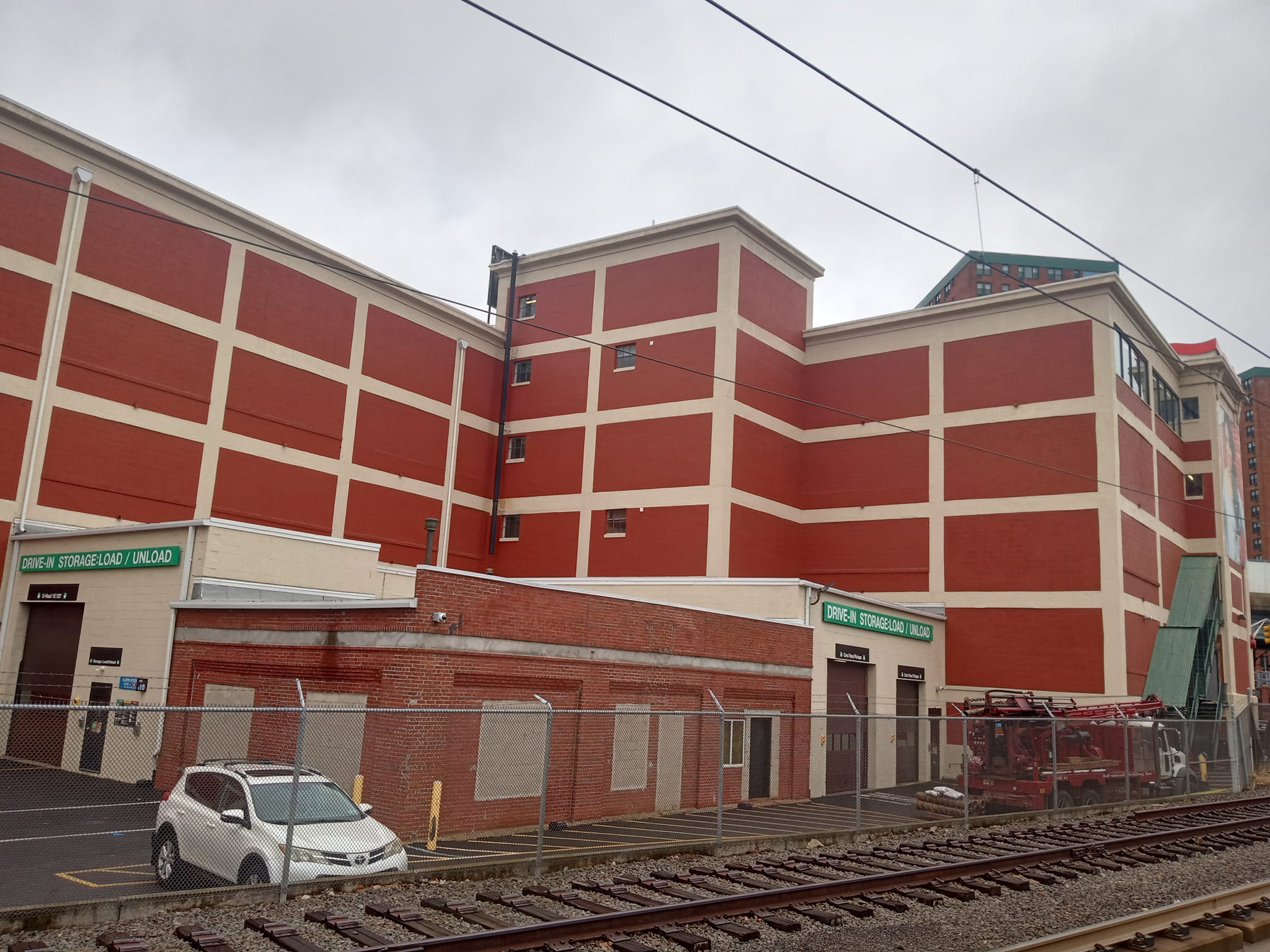
Orange Street platform view to U-Haul and formerly Tung-Sol Electric

=== Bloomfield extension ===
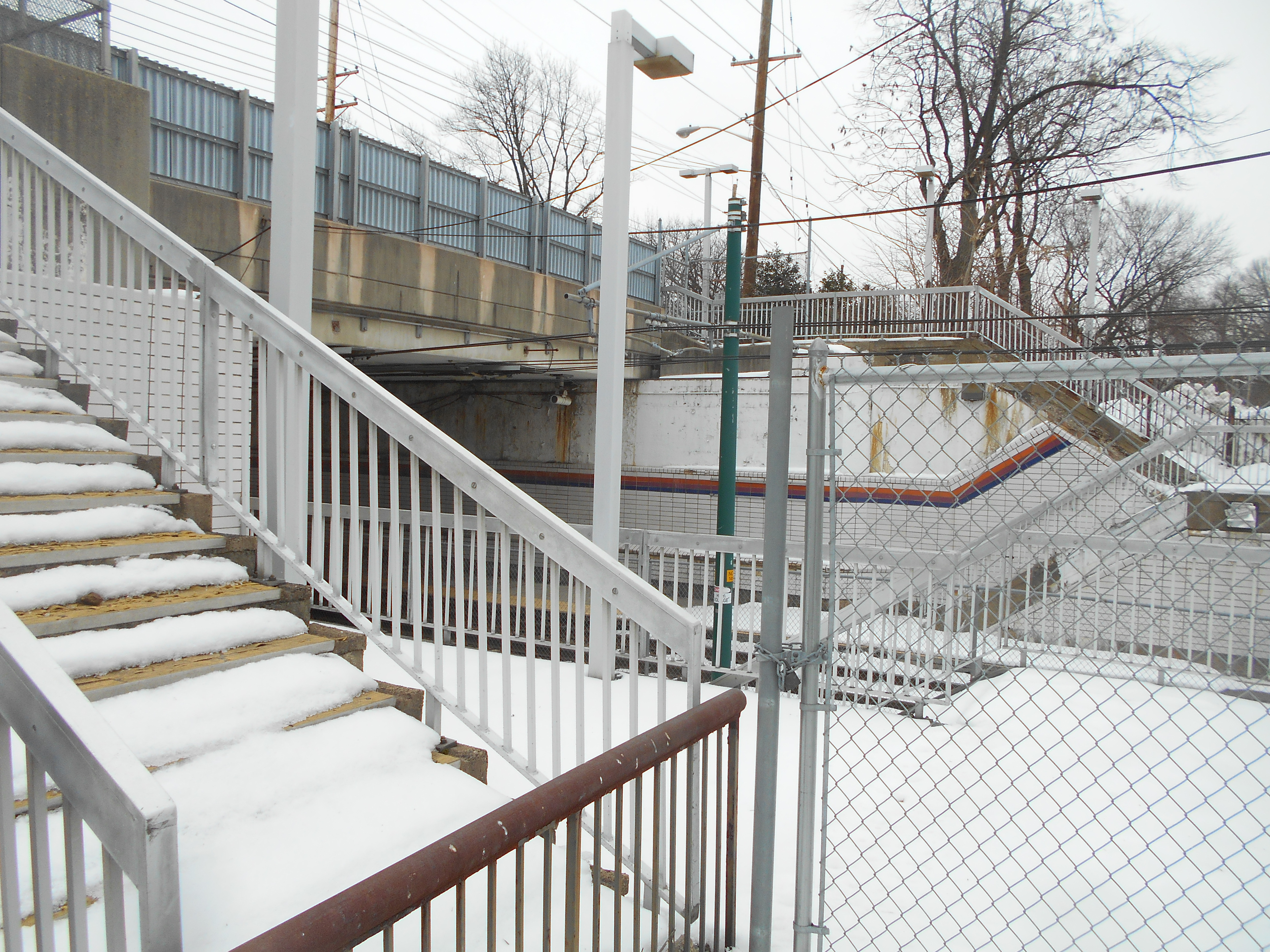
The former Heller Parkway station in February 2015

On June 22, 2002, the Newark City Subway was extended to the suburbs of Belleville and Bloomfield along what had been the former Erie Railroad Orange Branch, now under Norfolk Southern ownership. The extension was built to accommodate a new vehicle maintenance facility for the system's new light-rail vehicles. New stations were opened at Silver Lake and Grove Street, and the Heller Parkway and Franklin Avenue stations were combined into a new Branch Brook Park station. The loop at Franklin Avenue was removed, since the new vehicles are bidirectional, unlike the old PCCs. A new loop, however, is in place at the Grove Street maintenance facility. All the street crossings on the extension are at-grade.

The original agreement gave sole operating privileges to Norfolk Southern between 11 pm and 5 am daily, but a new agreement allowed passenger service to operate at all hours, with late-night service commencing on January 8, 2005. In exchange, Norfolk Southern was allowed to operate during all off-peak hours, when passenger trains are infrequent. Norfolk Southern has since ended freight service along the tracks, leaving the NLR as the sole user.

== Broad Street extension ==
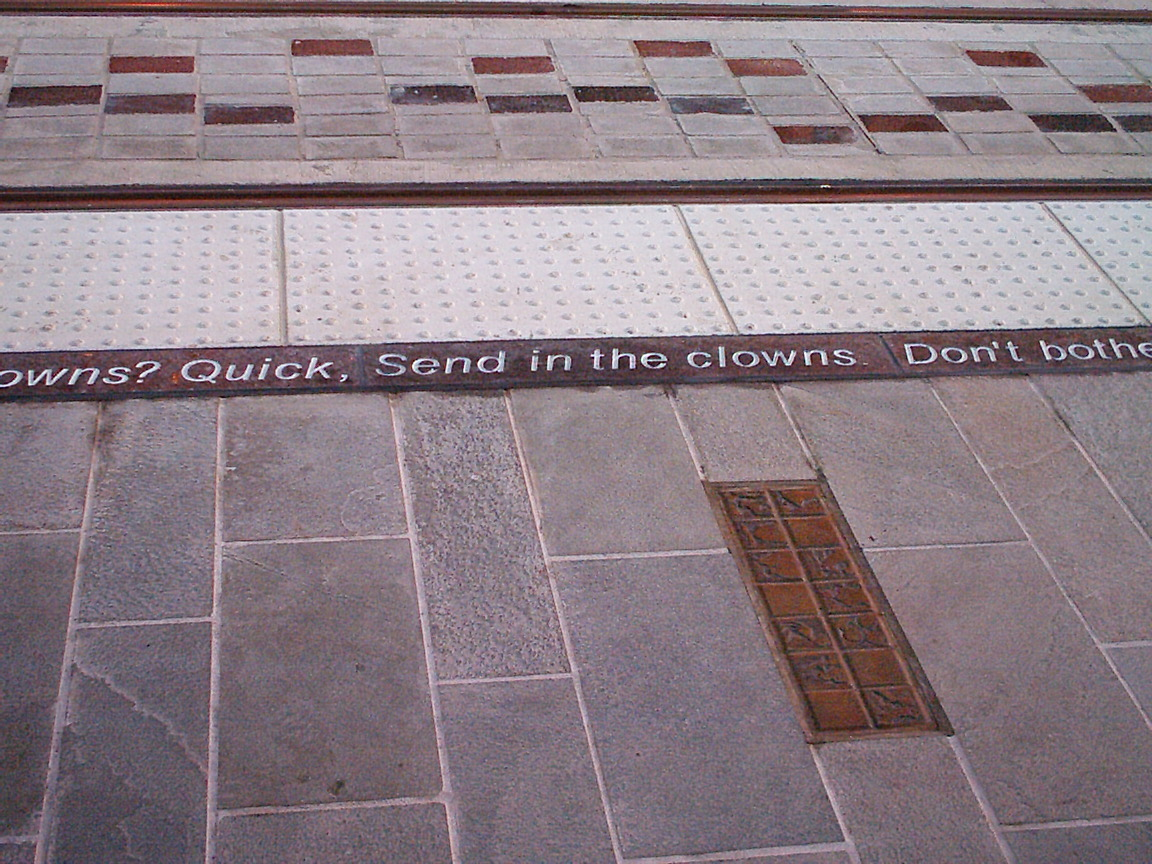
Lyrics to "Send in the Clowns", part of the tribute to Sarah Vaughan built into every station along this line

The Broad Street extension is the second segment of the Newark Light Rail. It was planned as the first phase of the unbuilt Newark-Elizabeth Rail Link. The line is one mile (1.6 km) long and connects Newark Penn Station to Broad Street Station. It branches off the older City Subway using the existing junction that had led to the Public Service terminal.

A new tunnel leads from the junction to a portal about two blocks north. The remaining section runs above ground. For a few blocks, the two tracks run on different streets a block or two apart. Both tracks serve the New Jersey Performing Arts Center at Center Street. The outbound track makes stops at Atlantic Street and at the Riverfront Square development (formerly a baseball stadium) at the Riverfront Stadium station. The inbound track makes a stop at Washington Park. The extension opened on July 17, 2006.

Construction began in 2002 with an estimated cost of $207.7 million, or about $40,000 per foot of track; it was completed within budget. Projections were for 4,000 average weekday boardings after one year, growing to about 7,000 in 2010. Actual weekday boardings in 2010 for both Newark Light Rail lines combined were reported at 9,000.

The art work at the new stations has a common theme, "Riding with Sarah and Wayne". It is a tribute to Newark-born jazz greats Sarah Vaughan and Wayne Shorter, and includes the lyrics to Vaughan's signature song, "Send in the Clowns", and colored bricks representing the music notes.

The Broad Street Extension was intended to ease connections between Newark's two rail stations. The two separate stations are a legacy of their roots in two separate railroads. Broad Street Station was once owned by the Lackawanna Railroad and its successor, the Erie Lackawanna Railway, while Penn Station was built and owned by the Pennsylvania Railroad. Previously, passengers wanting to transfer between Amtrak and the former PRR/Conrail commuter lines and the former (Erie) Lackawanna commuter lines had to make their own way (usually by taxi or bus) between the two stations.

== Cedar Street subway ==
Cedar Street subway
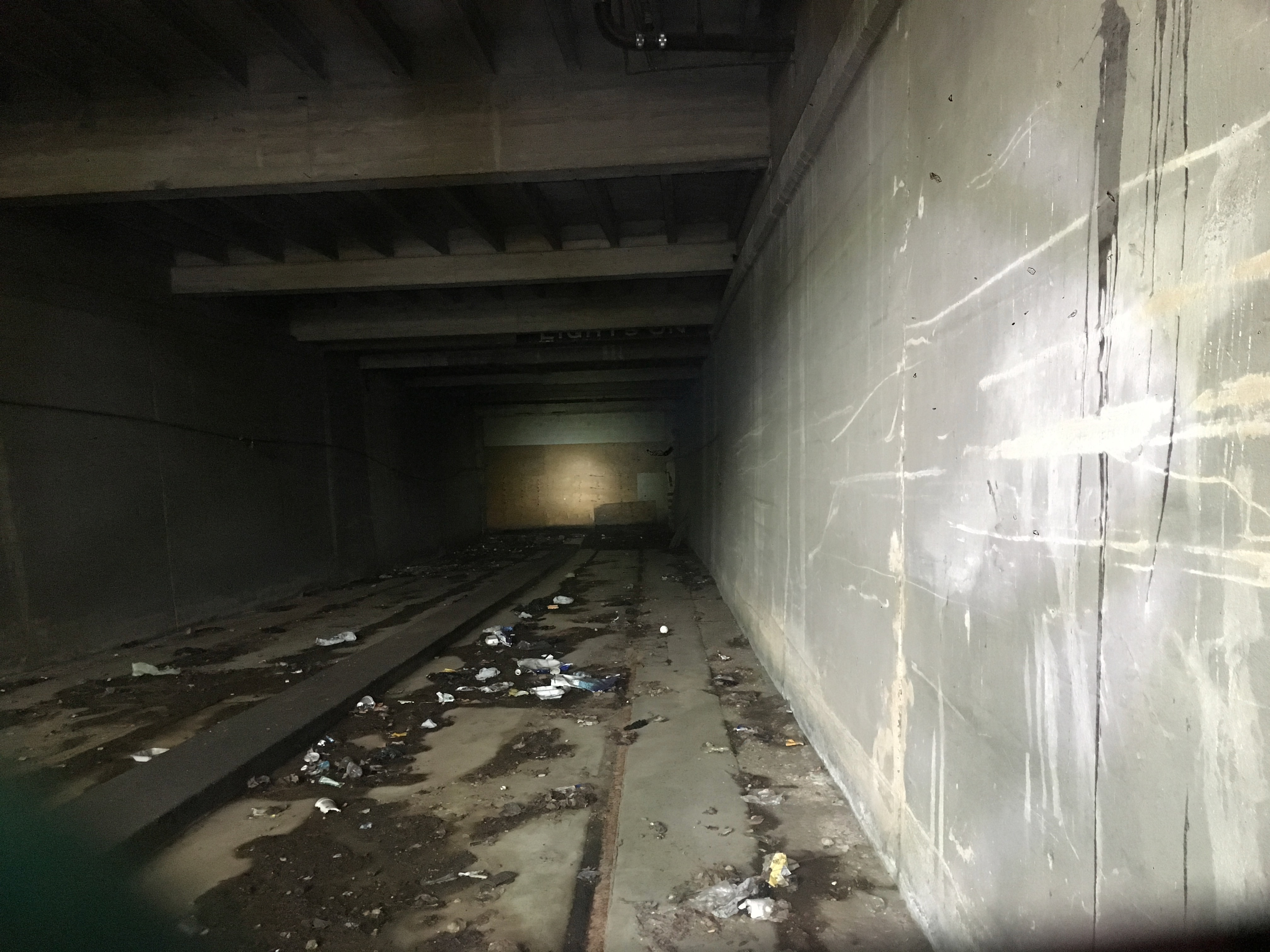
- Tunnel and tracks from the Cedar Street subway, a plywood wall blocks off the further extent of the tunnel

Overview
- Stations called at: 4 (One inbound, one outbound)
- Locale: Newark, New York
- Dates of operation: 1916–1966
- Successor: Broad Street extension

Technical
- Track gauge: 4 ft 8 1/2 in (1,435 mm) standard gauge

The Cedar Street subway was a rail tunnel that allowed streetcar (and later bus) access to the subterranean level of the Newark Public Service Terminal. It was built by the Public Service Corporation in 1916, as part of the terminal building, to reduce streetcar congestion at nearby Broad and Market streets, and provided access for a number of surface lines. The tunnel starts at street level at Washington Street and extends two blocks under Cedar Street and across Broad Street.

The subway line opened on April 30, 1916. At that time, four street car lines served Central Avenue, Orange, South Orange and Springfield. At its height in 1927, fourteen lines used the subway. An inbound station stop was added inside the tunnel under Cedar Street and Broad Street in January 1927, serving Kresge's Department Store. In August 1929, across the tracks, an outbound platform was added serving McCrory's 5 & 10 store. In 1937, the Cedar Street subway was extended to a junction with the newly opened Newark City Subway, allowing service to Newark Penn Station. This extension, however, was short-lived.

On May 8, 1966, the last three bus lines using the Cedar Street subway, Line 62 to Perth Amboy, Line 128 to Paterson and Line 134 to New Brunswick, operated final service through the tunnel. Since the demolition of the Public Service Terminal in 1981, it has ended at a wall under Broad Street.

In 2006, as part of the modernization of the City Subway into the Newark Light Rail, the former Cedar Street subway junction with the City Subway line was re-purposed to connect the Broad Street branch. The remainder of the Cedar Street subway remains closed as of 2026, although the tunnel portal and track stubs are still visible from Washington Street.

== Fares ==
The Newark Light Rail is equivalent to a one-zone bus ride: a one-way ticket costs $1.90 (as of July 1, 2026), and is valid on the entire system for one hour after the ticket is validated. A special $0.85 "Underground" fare is available for trips that use only the subway between Warren Street and Penn Station, not the surface portion. Through-ticketing is available for connecting bus routes. Monthly and weekly NJ Transit bus and rail passes valid for one or more local bus zones, as well as transfers purchased on buses, are also accepted.

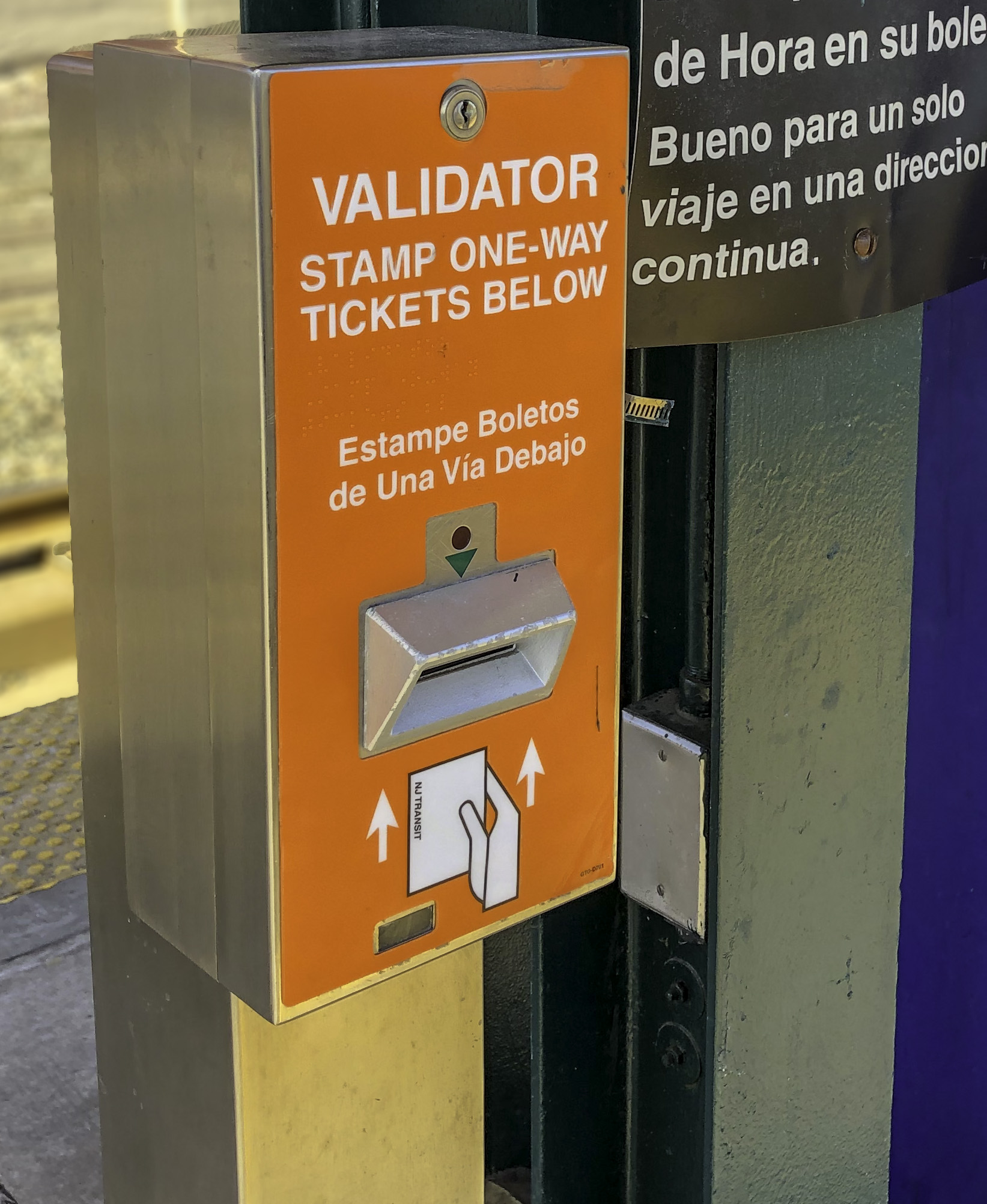
Ticket validator at a Newark Light Rail station

The Newark Light Rail, like most light rail systems in the United States, operates on a proof-of-payment system, in which riders must present their tickets upon request during random fare inspections by police officers, transit workers, or fare agents. Passengers must purchase tickets at ticket vending machines (TVMs) located on station platforms or near station entrances. The tickets can also be purchased via the New Jersey Transit mobile app. One-way, round-trip, and ten-trip tickets must then be validated, either by the app or with paper tickets, through automated validators located near the TVMs, which stamp the date and time on the ticket for 60 minutes of use. NJ Transit's fare inspectors randomly check tickets on trains and at stations; fare evasion carries a fine of up to $100. On the PCC streetcars, cash fares (exact fare) were paid on board via farebox, except for a brief period starting in October 1999 prior to the introduction of LRVs, when proof-of-payment fare collection was instituted.

== Stations ==
=== Newark City Subway ===
Location	Station	Opened	Transfers	Avg. weekday ridership (2024)	Notes
Newark	Newark Penn	June 20, 1937	Amtrak: Northeast Corridor services NJ Transit Rail: ■ Northeast Corridor Line, ■ North Jersey Coast Line, ■ Raritan Valley Line; PATH: NWK-WTC; NJ Transit Bus; Greyhound	5,246	
Newark	Military Park	May 26, 1935	NJ Transit Bus	1,191	Named Broad Street until September 4, 2004. Served the Newark Public Service Terminal
Newark	Washington Street	May 26, 1935	NJ Transit Bus	795	
Newark	Warren Street/NJIT	May 26, 1935	NJ Transit Bus	922	Named Warren Street until 2011.
Newark	Norfolk Street	May 26, 1935	NJ Transit Bus	830	
Newark	Orange Street	May 26, 1935	NJ Transit Bus	1,066	
Newark	Park Avenue	May 26, 1935	NJ Transit Bus	1,466	
Newark	Bloomfield Avenue	May 26, 1935	NJ Transit Bus	1,347	
Newark	Davenport Avenue	May 26, 1935		613	
Newark	Heller Parkway	May 26, 1935			Closed June 21, 2002.
Newark	Branch Brook Park	November 22, 1940	NJ Transit Bus	1,773	Named North Sixth Street until 1953 and Franklin Avenue until 2001.
Belleville	Silver Lake	June 22, 2002	NJ Transit Bus	506	
Bloomfield	Grove Street	June 22, 2002	NJ Transit Bus	618	

=== Broad Street branch ===
All stations are in Newark.

Station	Opened	Transfers	Avg. weekday ridership (2024)	Notes
Newark Penn	June 20, 1937	Amtrak: Northeast Corridor services NJ Transit Rail: ■ Northeast Corridor Line, ■ North Jersey Coast Line, ■ Raritan Valley Line; PATH; NJ Transit Bus; Greyhound, BoltBus	5,246	
NJPAC/Center Street	July 17, 2006		365	
Line splits into one-way directions
Harriet Tubman Square	July 17, 2006	NJ Transit Bus	176	Southbound only
Atlantic Street	July 17, 2006		8	Northbound only
Riverfront Stadium	July 17, 2006		2	Northbound only
Lines re-converge entering Broad Street
Broad Street	July 17, 2006	NJ Transit Rail: ■ Gladstone Branch, ■ Montclair–Boonton Line, ■ Morristown Line; NJ Transit Bus	384	

On weekdays, service operates separately between the two sections. On weekends, service operates jointly.

=== Cedar Street subway (closed) ===
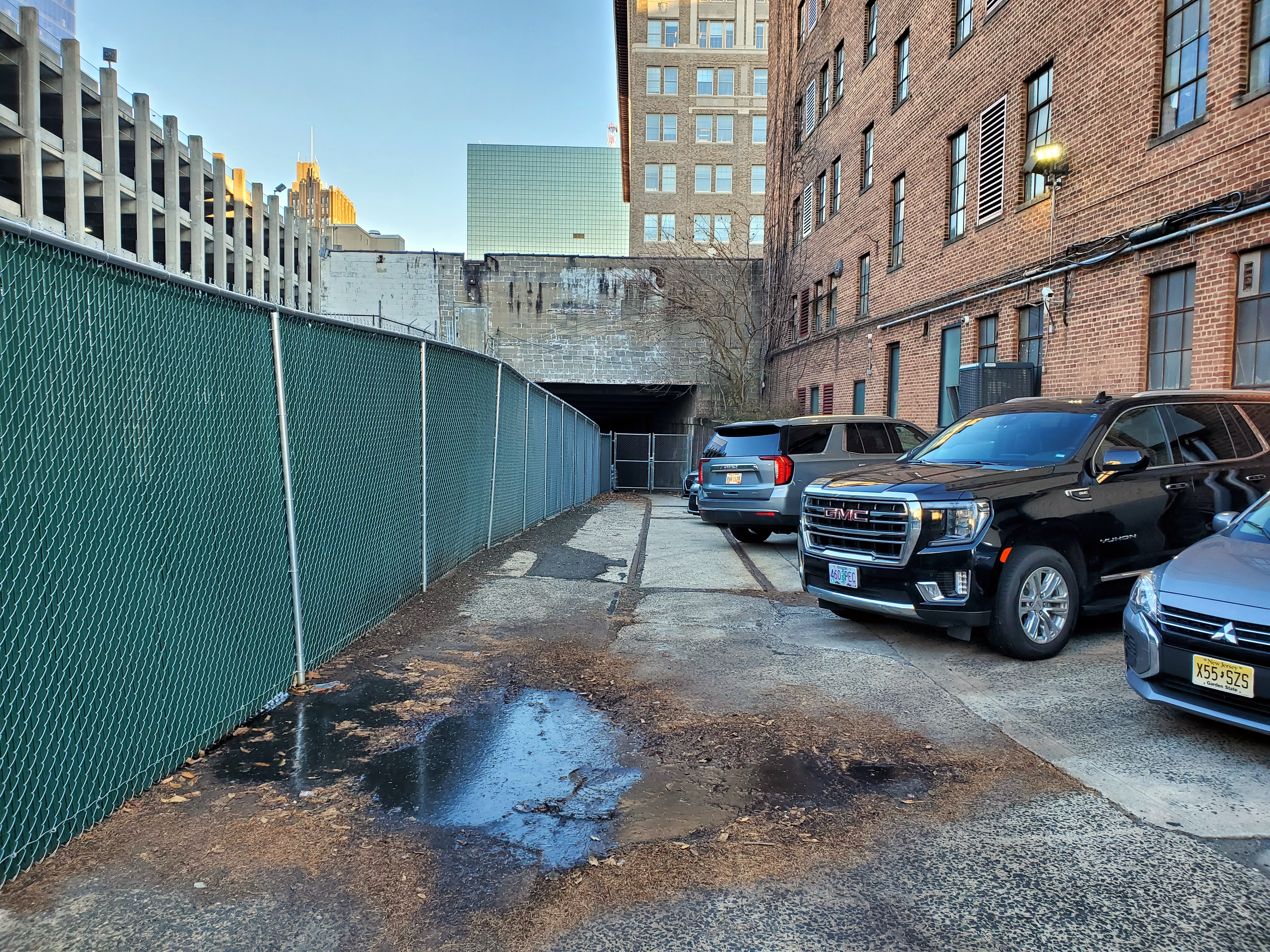
Washington Street subway portal in 2024

Location	Station	Opened	Notes
Newark	Washington Street		Located in front of the subway portal
Newark	McCrory's (outbound)	August 1929	Served the McCrory's five-and-dime store
Newark	Kresge's (inbound)	January 27, 1927	Served the Kresge-Newark department store
Newark	Public Service Terminal	April 30, 1916	Served the lower platforms of the Public Service Terminal

== Rolling stock ==
The Newark Light Rail system uses a new-model vehicle built by Kinki Sharyo of Japan. This model is the same one used by the Hudson–Bergen Light Rail system, although the ones used on the Newark Light Rail were built with slight modifications to the trucks and wheels to handle the tight turn of the Penn Station loop that was originally built for PCC cars. Like the HBLR vehicles, the NLR vehicle is a double-articulated vehicle with three sections. Each of the two end sections has an operator's cab at the far end, thus eliminating the need for the vehicle to turn itself around physically in order to reverse direction. Each end section also has seating for 16 passengers on an upper level, and seating for 13 passengers on the lower level, including one special fold-down seat next to an empty space that a passenger using a wheelchair may use. With these two sections, and a middle section that seats ten passengers (five on each side), the vehicle can comfortably accommodate 68 seated passengers and two wheelchairs. An additional 122 passengers could stand in the vehicle, if necessary. Vehicles can be coupled into two-unit sets. A contract to expand 10 of the 20 LRVs assigned to the Newark Light Rail system for the purpose of increasing passenger capacity was approved on July 9, 2014.

The Seashore Trolley Museum in Kennebunkport, ME acquired PCC #5 in 2011. The car represents the first piece of NJT rolling stock in the museum's collection. The car is currently undergoing restoration and rehabilitation work so that it may operate on the museum's 1 1/2-mile demonstration railway. Car #5 joins the museum's already-extensive collection of PCC cars from numerous cities, including Boston, Pittsburgh, Dallas, San Francisco, Philadelphia, Washington, D.C., and Kansas CIty.

== Timeline ==
- December 22, 1910: The Public Service Corporation first announces plans to build the subway, initially including a line under Broad Street from Bridge Street to Clinton Avenue
- October 3, 1934: The subway opens from Broad Street to Heller Parkway. The No. 21 line is routed onto the subway via the Warren Street Ramp and level junction at the Orange Street grade crossing. The No. 23 line is routed via the Norfolk Street Ramp. The No. 29 line starts using the Bloomfield Avenue Ramp.
- June 20, 1937: The extension to Newark Penn Station opens. This is the same day that the Hudson and Manhattan Railroad (present-day PATH) withdraws service from its Park Place terminal and first operates into its new alignment at Newark Penn Station. The No. 13, #27 and No. 43 lines are rerouted to Penn Station via the Cedar Street Subway; the No. 27 and No. 43 had used the lower level of the Newark Public Service Terminal.
- June 21, 1937: The No. 17 line is rerouted via the Cedar Street Subway.
- July 18, 1937: The No. 13 and No. 17 lines stop using the Cedar Street Subway.
- December 29, 1937: The No. 27 line stops using the Cedar Street Subway.
- May 1, 1938: The No. 43 line stops using the Cedar Street Subway, ending all service on that connection.
- November 22, 1940: The extension to North 6th Street (later Franklin Avenue) opens.
- December 14, 1947: The No. 23 line stops using the Norfolk Street Ramp.
- March 1, 1951: The No. 21 line stops using the Warren Street Ramp.
- March 29, 1952: The No. 21 line stops using the level junction at the Orange Street grade crossing.
- March 30, 1952: The No. 29 line stops using the Bloomfield Avenue ramps.
- January 8, 1954: The first PCC car uses the subway.
- October 1980: NJ Transit takes over operations.
- August 21, 1999: The subway is closed for two weeks for an overhaul.
- September 7, 1999: The subway reopens.
- August 24, 2001: The PCC cars are retired from service.
- August 27, 2001: The new light rail vehicles begin operation.
- June 21, 2002: Heller Parkway closes.
- June 22, 2002: Silver Lake and Grove Street open.
- September 4, 2004: Broad Street is renamed Military Park.
- January 8, 2005: Additional late-night service is provided to Grove Street.
- July 17, 2006: The Newark City Subway extension opens, with service between Newark Penn Station and Newark Broad Street. Service is rebranded as the Newark Light Rail.

=== Accidents ===
The Newark City Subway has had a few accidents over the years:

- September 22, 1981 – Nine passengers injured when an incoming trolley rammed into the rear of a stationary trolley at Newark Penn Station.
- April 15, 2003 – A light rail vehicle was partially derailed at the grade crossing near Orange Street Station when a box truck rammed the vehicle from the side. The signal was in the light rail vehicle's favor.
- August 23, 2008 – A dump truck making an illegal right turn crashed into a light rail vehicle at the Washington Park Station of the Broad Street segment causing it to partially derail. One passenger was injured.
- August 28, 2014 – A light rail vehicle crashed into a SUV between Atlantic Avenue and Broad Street. No passengers were injured.
- April 6, 2016 – A light rail vehicle was hit by a car on South Franklin Avenue. No passengers were injured.

== In popular culture ==
- In November 2011 scenes for the movie The Dark Knight Rises were filmed at Military Park station.

== See also ==
- Hudson–Bergen Light Rail
- River Line
- Light rail in the United States
- List of tram and light rail transit systems
