= Newark Broad Street station =

NJ Transit rail station

Newark Broad Street
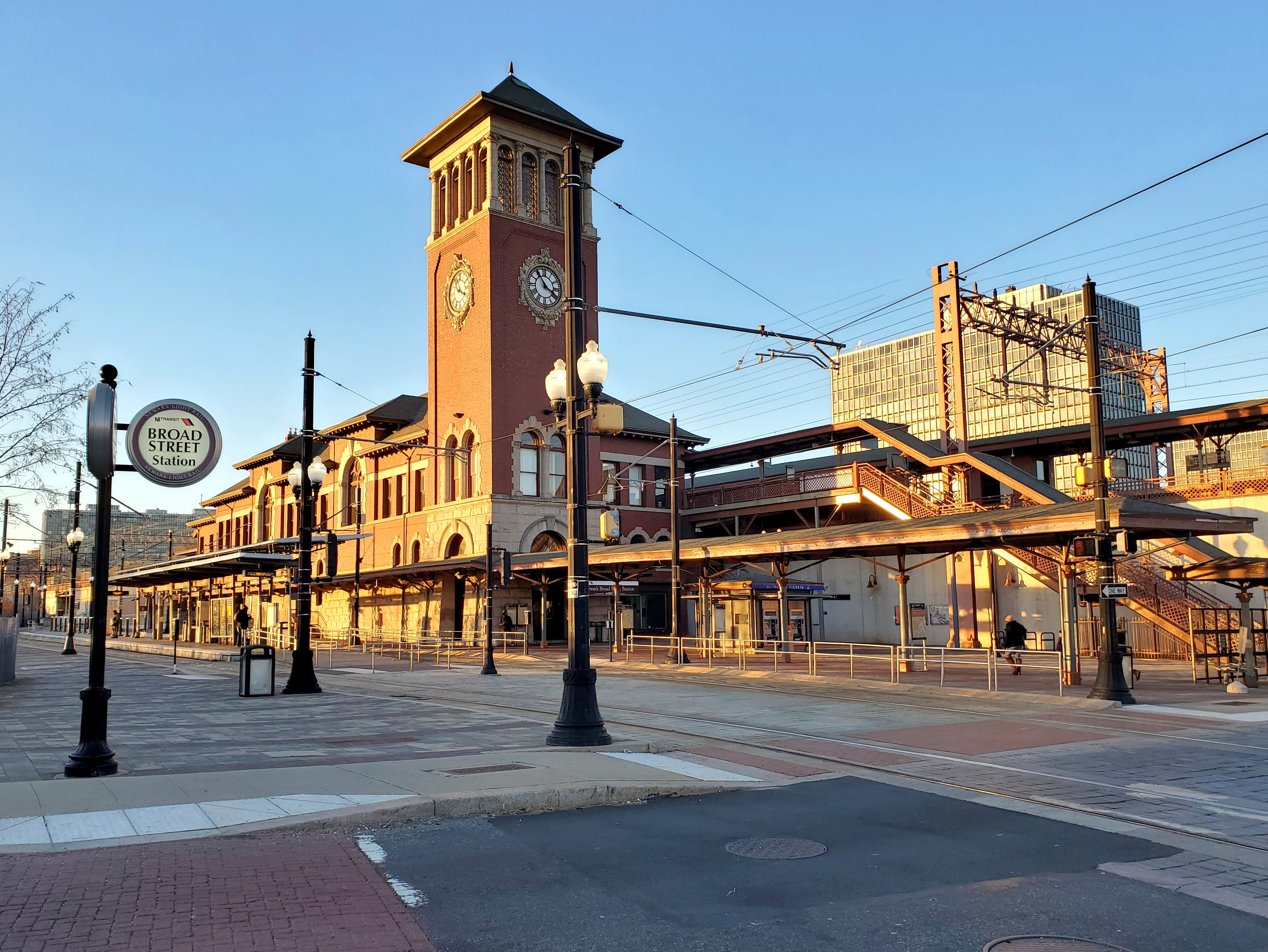
- Newark Broad Street station in 2024

General information
- Location: Lackawanna Avenue and Broad Street; Newark, New Jersey, U.S.
- Coordinates: 40°44′51″N 74°10′19″W
- Owner: New Jersey Transit
- Line: NJ Transit Rail Operations
- Platforms: Commuter rail: 1 island platform, 1 side platform; Light rail: 1 island platform
- Tracks: Commuter rail: 3; Light rail: 2
- Connections: NJ Transit Bus: 11, 13, 27, 28, go28, 29, 30, 41, 71, 72, 73, 76, 78, 108, 378

Construction
- Platform levels: 2
- Cycle facilities: Yes
- Accessible: Yes

Other information
- Station code: Light rail: 30775
- Fare zone: 2 (commuter rail)

History
- Opened: November 19, 1836
- Rebuilt: 1903, 2008
- Electrified: September 3, 1930

Passengers
NJ Transit Rail Operations
- 2025: 2,441 (average weekday)
- Rank: 14 of 153
Newark Light Rail
- 2025: 426 (average weekday)
- Rank: 13 of 17

Services
Preceding station	NJ Transit	Following station
East Orange toward Gladstone	Gladstone Branch (weekdays)	Hoboken Terminus
East Orange toward Gladstone	Gladstone Branch (weekdays)	Secaucus Junction (limited service) toward New York
Watsessing Avenue toward Hackettstown	Montclair–Boonton Line	Hoboken Terminus
Watsessing Avenue toward Hackettstown	Montclair–Boonton Line (weekdays)	Secaucus Junction toward New York
East Orange toward Hackettstown	Morristown Line	Secaucus Junction toward New York
East Orange toward Hackettstown	Morristown Line (weekdays)	Hoboken Terminus
Newark Light Rail
Harriet Tubman Square toward Newark Penn	Broad Street – Newark Penn	Riverfront Stadium One-way operation
Former services
Preceding station	NJ Transit	Following station
Watsessing toward Bay Street	Montclair Branch	Hoboken Terminus
Ampere toward Bay Street	Montclair Branch	Hoboken Terminus
Roseville Avenue toward Bay Street	Montclair Branch until 1984	Harrison toward Hoboken
Grove Street toward Gladstone	Gladstone Branch until April 7, 1991	Hoboken Terminus
Grove Street toward Hackettstown	Morristown Line until April 7, 1991	Hoboken Terminus
Preceding station	Delaware, Lackawanna and Western Railroad	Following station
Roseville Avenue toward Buffalo	Main Line	Hoboken Terminus
Roseville Avenue toward Gladstone	Gladstone Branch	Hoboken Terminus
Roseville Avenue toward Montclair	Montclair Branch	Harrison toward Hoboken
Future services
Preceding station	NJ Transit	Following station
Watsessing Avenue toward Andover	Lackawanna Cut-Off	Hoboken toward New York or Hoboken
- Newark Broad Street Station
- U.S. National Register of Historic Places
- Area: 1.5 acres (0.61 ha)
- Built: 1901
- Architect: Frank J. Nies
- Architectural style: Colonial Revival, Renaissance
- MPS: Operating Passenger Railroad Stations TR
- NRHP reference No.: 84002662
- Added to NRHP: June 22, 1984
Location

Newark Broad Street station is a New Jersey Transit commuter rail and light rail station at 25 University Avenue in Newark, New Jersey. Built in 1903, the station's historic architecture includes an elegant clock tower and a brick and stone façade on the station's main building. In June 1984, the station was added to the National Register of Historic Places in recognition of its historical significance.

== History ==
The current station is the second on the site. The original station opened on November 19, 1836, at the east end of the opening segment of the Morris and Essex Railroad to Orange; for the first couple of decades trains east of Newark ran over the New Jersey Rail Road to Jersey City. The present station opened in 1903 after two years of construction, located on the Delaware, Lackawanna and Western Railroad main line from Hoboken to Denville, Scranton and Buffalo The Newark Drawbridge connecting to the station and crossing the Passaic River to the east also opened in 1903. A number of western expansions were built, and Hoboken Terminal, the current eastern end of the line, opened in 1907. In 1945, the Morris and Essex Railroad officially merged into the Lackawanna Railroad, which had leased it since 1868 (though the Morris and Essex' separate identity had been largely lost years before). DL&W merged with the Erie Railroad in 1960 to form the Erie Lackawanna Railroad, which was absorbed by Conrail in 1976; NJ Transit has operated all passenger service since 1983.

The station had served several Lackawanna and then Erie Lackwanna passenger trains. These included the Lake Cities, Owl/New York Mail, Twilight/Pocono Express and the DLW flagship train, the Phoebe Snow. However, all intercity service ended by 1970.

The station building has been listed in the state and federal registers of historic places since 1984 and is part of the Operating Passenger Railroad Stations Thematic Resource.

=== Renovation ===
From 2004 to 2008 the station was renovated. The station changed from having two outside low platforms, with walkways across one track to the middle track, to having two high platforms, one of them an island platform, to facilitate cross-platform transfers. The historic westbound shelter was removed in the project and new westbound waiting areas were built.

=== Proposed Scranton–New York City line ===
In 2023, a new Amtrak line was proposed between Scranton and New York with an estimated half a million riders annually by 2030. It is planned to hit 110 miles per hour (180 km/h). The closest station to the New York Penn Station on the line is Newark Broad Street. The next stop will be either Morristown station or Montclair's Bay Street station depending on the schedule it is running.

== Station layout and services ==
Broad Street Station is currently served by the Montclair–Boonton Line and both branches of the Morris and Essex Lines –– the Morristown Line and Gladstone Branch. All three lines either proceed to Secaucus Junction en route to New York Penn Station or terminate in Hoboken.

This station is also the northern terminus of the Newark Light Rail Broad Street Extension line from Newark Penn Station. Service on this line opened on July 17, 2006, although light rail service was unavailable from March through July 2008 due to a partial collapse of the former Westinghouse factory adjacent to the station during demolition. This allows passengers on the two commuter lines serving Broad Street to easily transfer to Newark Penn, and vice versa. Previously, passengers wishing to transfer in Newark had to make their own way (usually by bus or taxi) between the two stations.

== Gallery ==
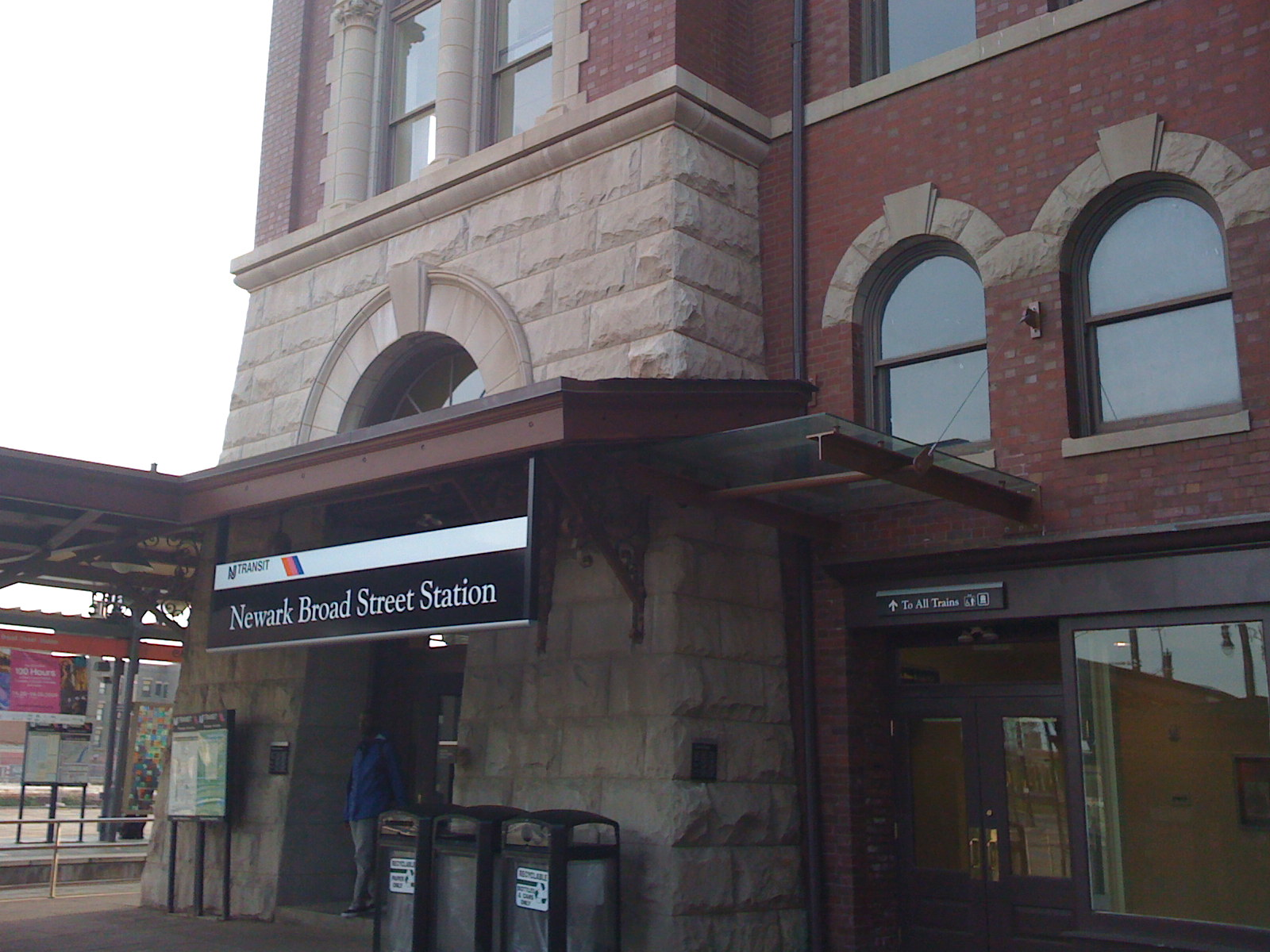
Station entrance on University Avenue

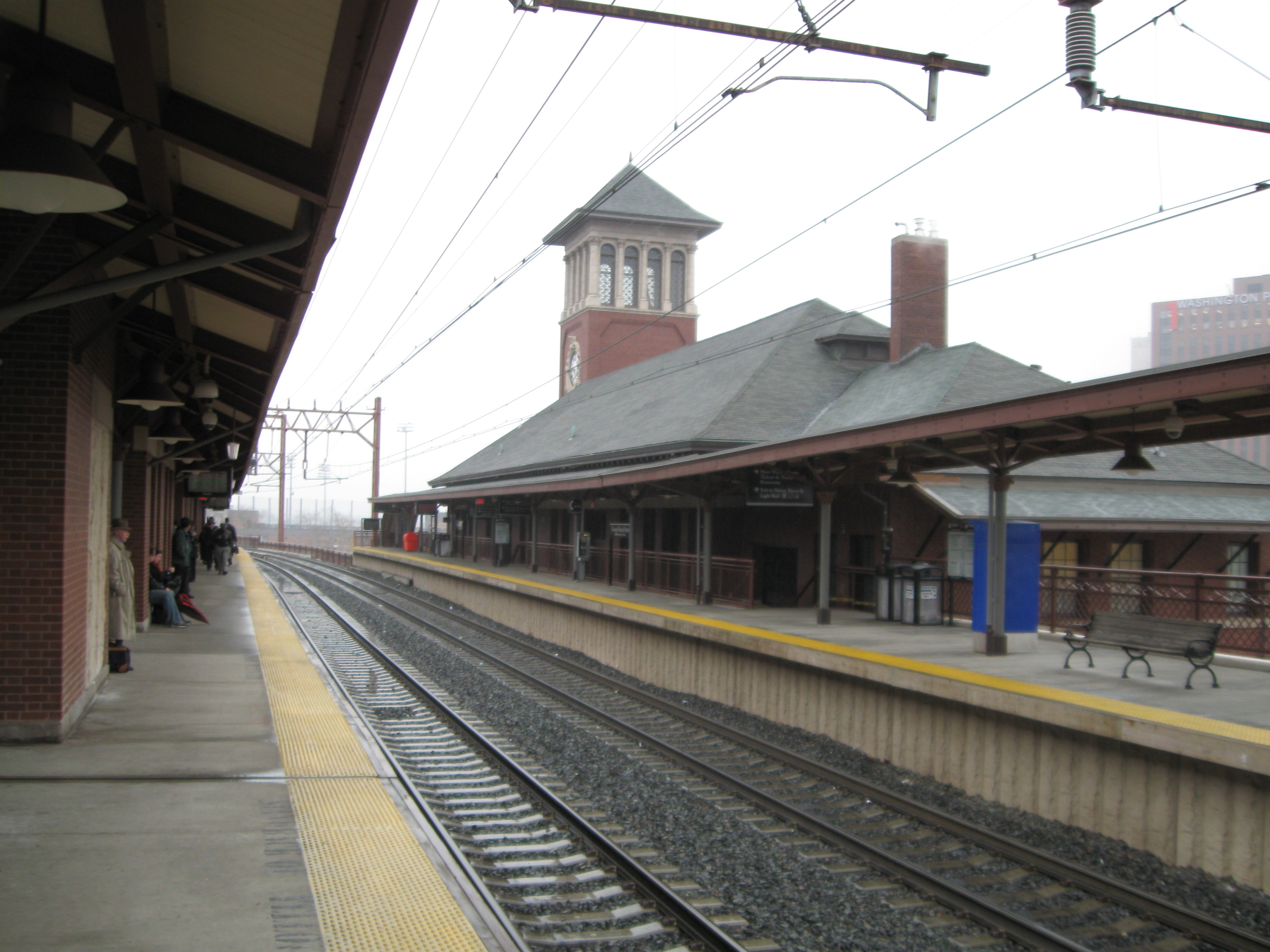
Commuter rail platforms

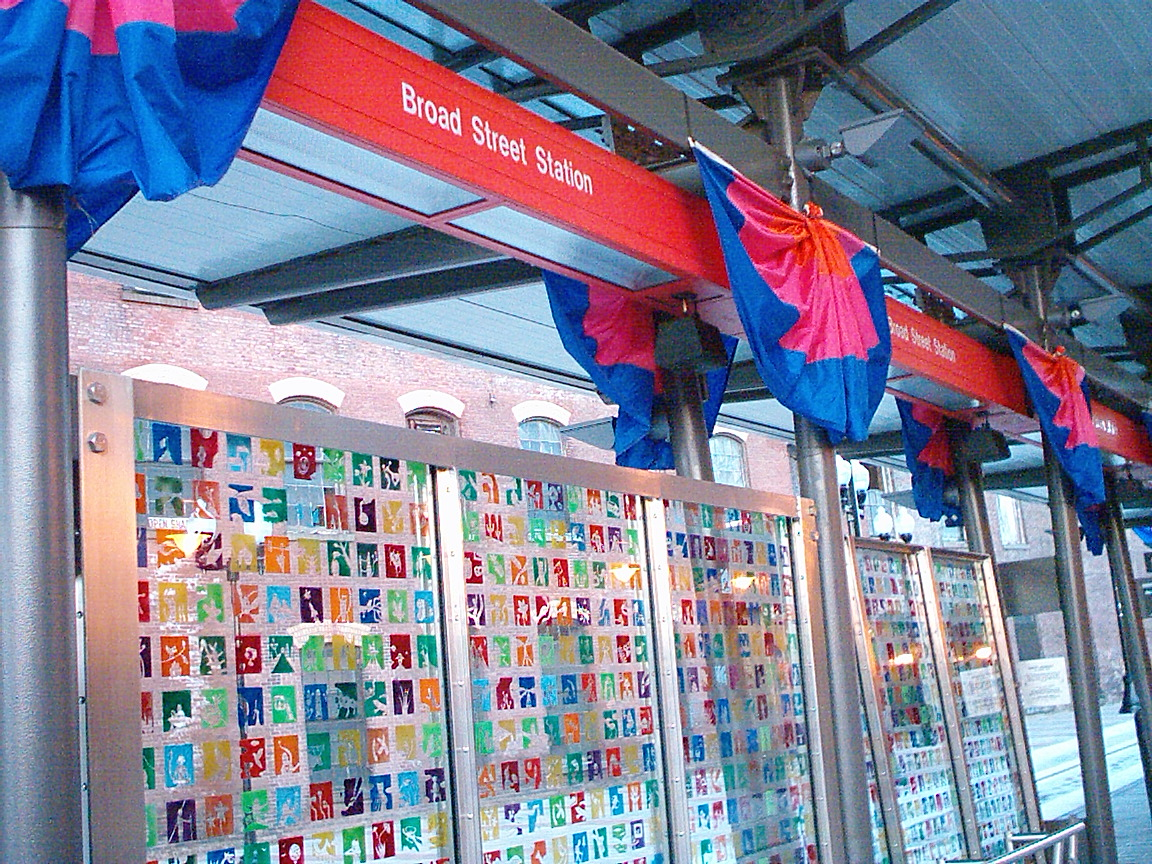
Light rail station

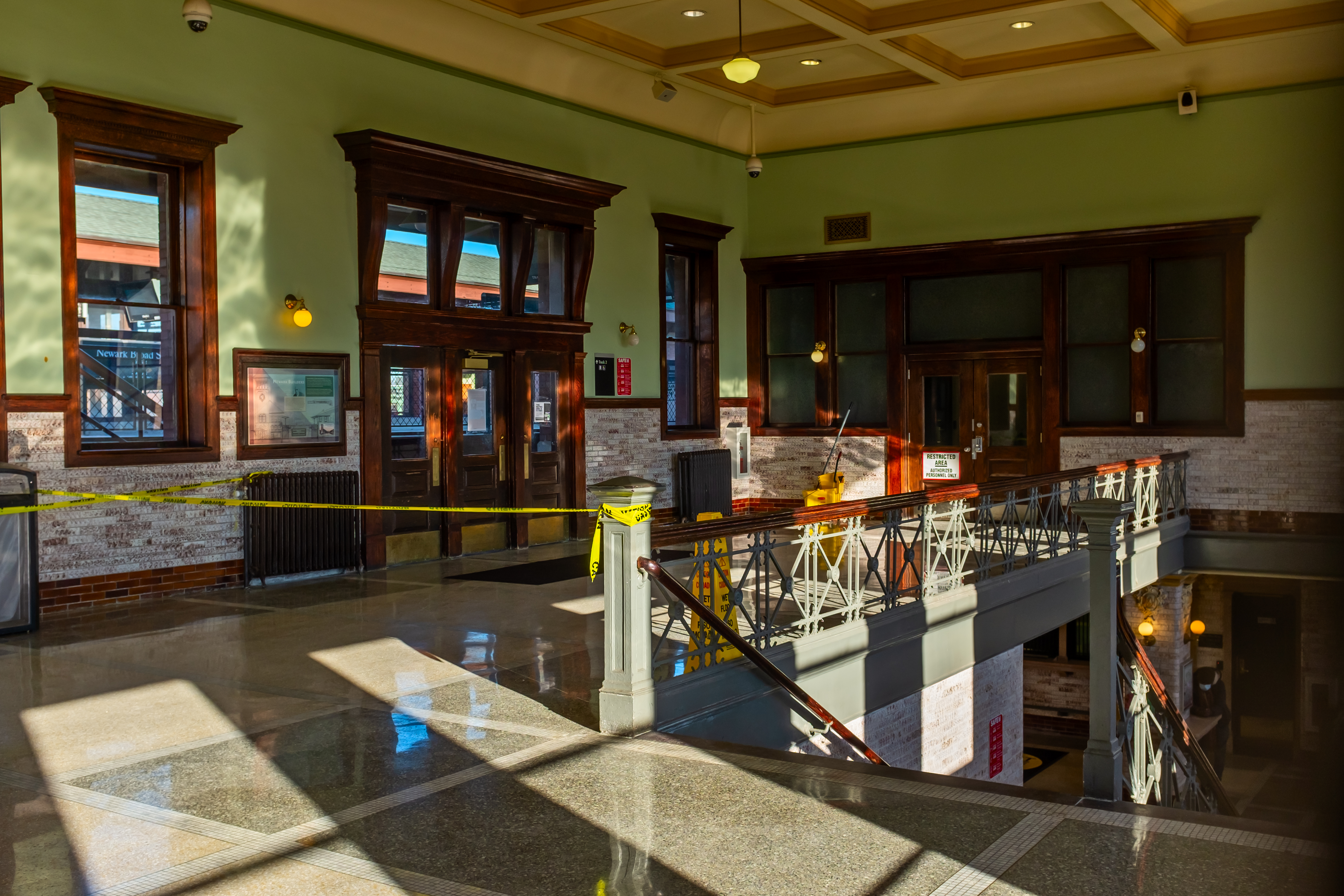
Waiting room, during COVID-19 Pandemic

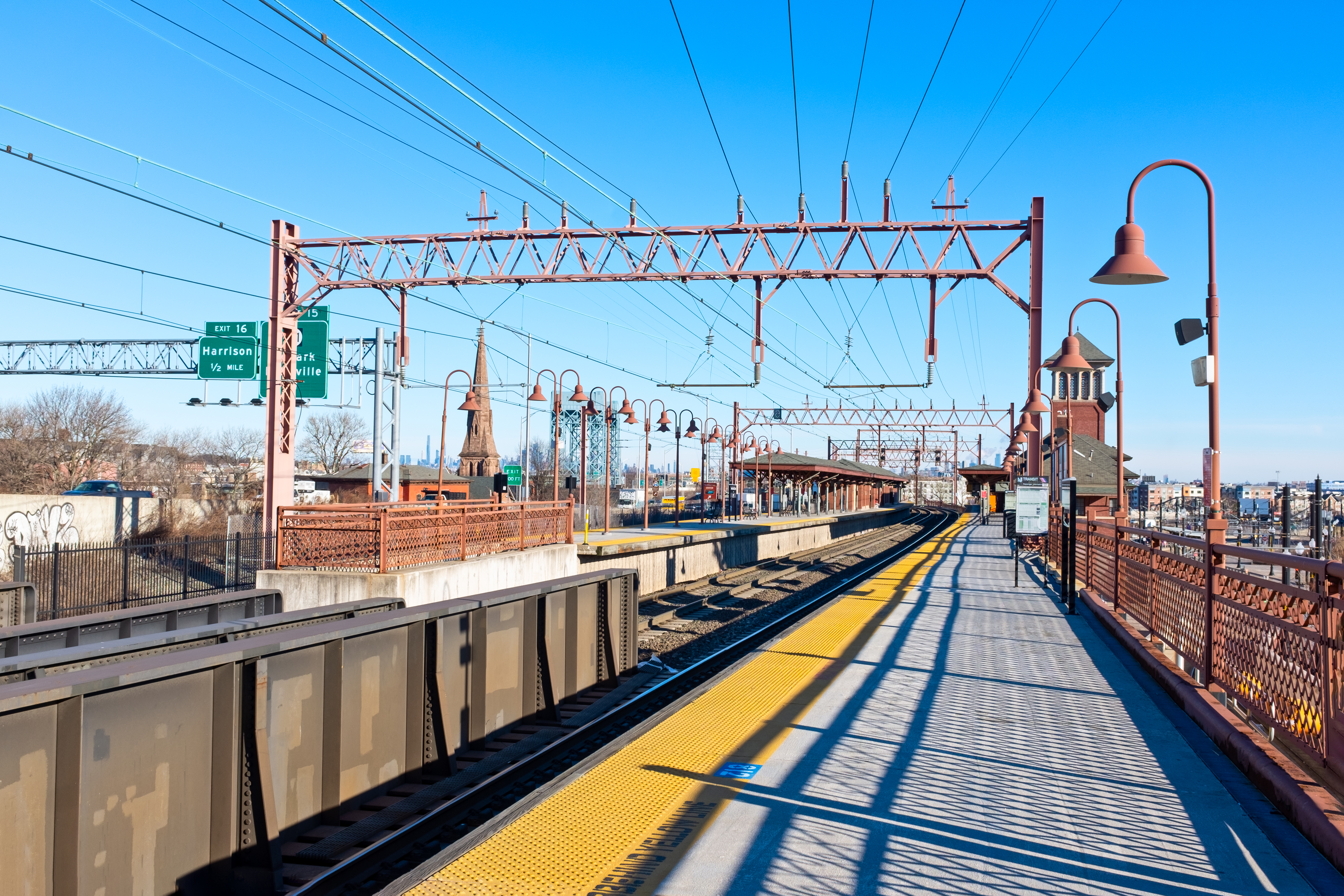
Platforms during the COVID-19 Pandemic

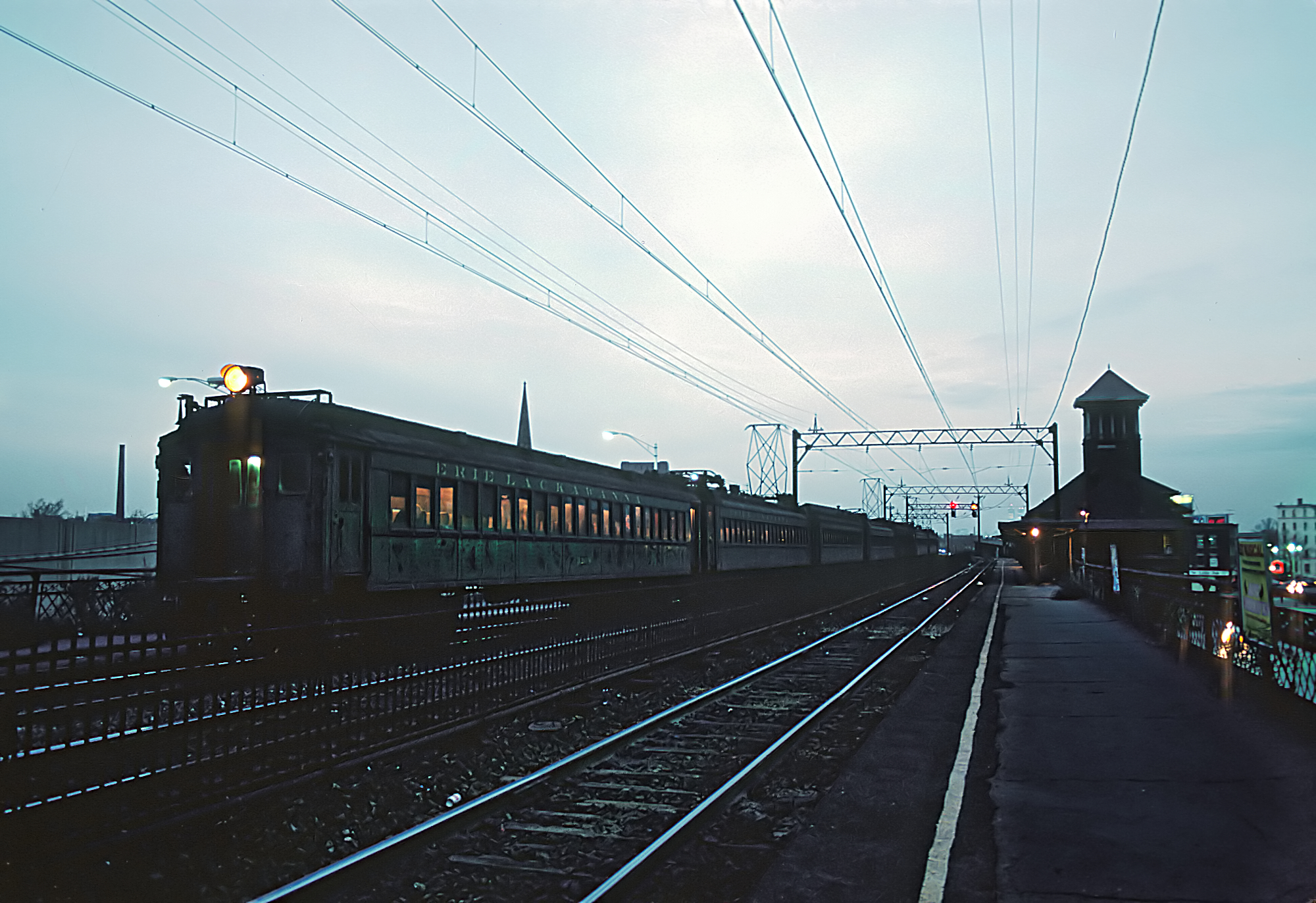
An Erie-Lackawana electric at Broad Street station in November 1978

== Bibliography ==
- Douglass, A.M. (1912). The Railroad Trainman, Volume 29. Cleveland, Ohio: Brotherhood of Railroad Trainmen.
