= Roseville Avenue station =

Former NJ Transit rail station

Roseville Ave

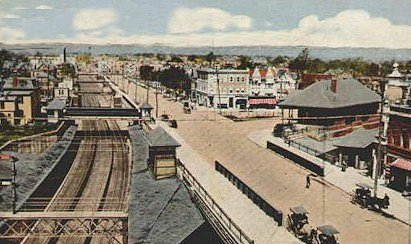
- A view of Seventh Avenue, Newark in the Roseville District in the early 1900s. The entirety of the station is visible in this aerial.

General information
- Location: Roseville Avenue and Seventh Avenue in Roseville, Newark, New Jersey
- Coordinates: 40°45′18.5″N 74°11′30.4″W
- Owner: New Jersey Transit
- Line: Montclair Branch Morristown Line Gladstone Branch
- Tracks: 2 Montclair Branch, 3 Morris & Essex Lines

Other information
- Station code: 409 (Morris and Essex Railroad); 600 (Montclair Branch)

History
- Closed: September 16, 1984
- Rebuilt: December 1905
- Electrified: September 3, 1930
- Former names: Bloomfield Junction

Former services
Preceding station	NJ Transit	Following station
Grove Street toward Gladstone	Gladstone Branch	Newark Broad Street toward New York or Hoboken
Grove Street toward Hackettstown	Morristown Line	Newark Broad Street toward New York or Hoboken
Ampere toward Bay Street	Montclair Branch	Newark Broad Street toward Hoboken
Preceding station	Delaware, Lackawanna and Western Railroad	Following station
Grove Street toward Buffalo	Main Line	Newark toward Hoboken
Ampere toward Montclair	Montclair Branch	Newark toward Hoboken
Summit toward Gladstone	Gladstone Branch	Newark toward Hoboken
Location

Roseville Avenue was a transfer station on New Jersey Transit's Morris & Essex Lines (consisting of the Montclair Branch, Morristown Line and Gladstone Branch) in Newark, New Jersey, United States. The station was built by the Delaware, Lackawanna and Western Railroad in 1903 as part of a project to lower the tracks below the road surface to eliminate grade crossings. It serviced Newark's Roseville neighborhood. It once had two tracks (one each eastbound and westbound) on the Lackawanna mainline and two low-wall platforms, with an additional platform along the Montclair Branch. The station remained in service during most of the 20th century, until New Jersey Transit closed the station on September 16, 1984.

Today, the only landmarks that mark the former station site are a metal utility box labeled "Roseville," and several flights of concrete stairs in the sides of the concrete-lined depression in which the track of the Morristown Line runs between the East Orange and Newark Broad Street stations. Shortly east of this structure, the Montclair-Boonton Line splits from the Morristown Line on its way to Montclair, Boonton, and Denville.

== Station structure ==
Roseville Avenue station consisted of two different sets of track to serve passenger trains for the Delaware, Lackawanna, and Western Railroad's double-track Montclair Branch (now the Montclair-Boonton Line) and the Delaware, Lackawanna, and Western Railroad's triple-track Morris & Essex Lines (now the Morristown Line). The tracks are 22 feet (6.7 m) below the street level, and the station below street level was a brick passenger station extending to the Roseville Avenue bridge at Seventh Avenue. The other structure stood on street level, above the cut, served the Morris and Essex Line just north of the junction at Roseville. The station had four platforms, two for the Montclair Branch and two for the Morristown Line in both directions.

Roseville Tower was the interlocking tower at street-level in Roseville that handled the nearby junction of the two lines (Montclair and Morristown). The tower was staffed only for two shifts, 5 a.m. to 10 p.m. The rest of the time, the tower was set on automatic, as no switching moves were typically required overnight.

== History ==
=== Original station and track depression ===
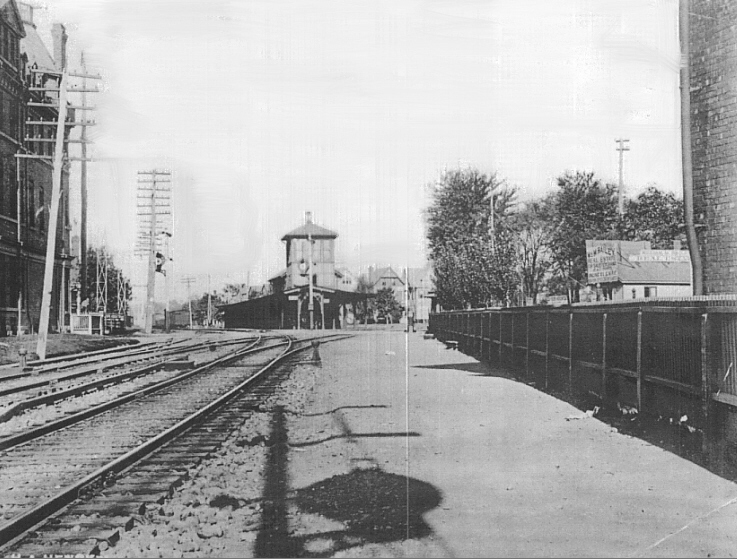
Roseville Avenue station before the track depressing in the 1890s

The original Roseville Avenue station dates back to the opening of the Morris & Essex Railroad Station in 1856, when tracks were constructed through the Roseville district of Newark. These tracks ran between Orange Street and Seventh Avenue, until the Morris & Essex line branched off at Roseville Avenue and continued northwest, the original station serving both branches. The station was designed with two platforms, one along each line, the Morris & Essex first made use of the Montclair Branch property in April 1868 after buying the Newark and Bloomfield Railroad.

In April 1901, the Delaware, Lackawanna and Western Railroad announced track depression and raising throughout portions of the line through Newark and the Oranges. Although the depression went into Newark, most of the debate over localities of stations was basically into the Oranges. In 1903, the track depression reached the Roseville Avenue Station, and the lines were depressed through Roseville. The new station built during the track depression was of similar style, with the station in the middle of the five-track interlocking, with one platform servicing the Montclair Branch's two tracks and one for the Main Line's two tracks. Rather than crossing at-grade, Roseville Avenue was bridged over the tracks with a brand new street-level interlocking tower present at the intersection of Roseville and Seventh Avenues.

=== Delaware, Lackawanna and Western, and Erie–Lackawanna ownership ===
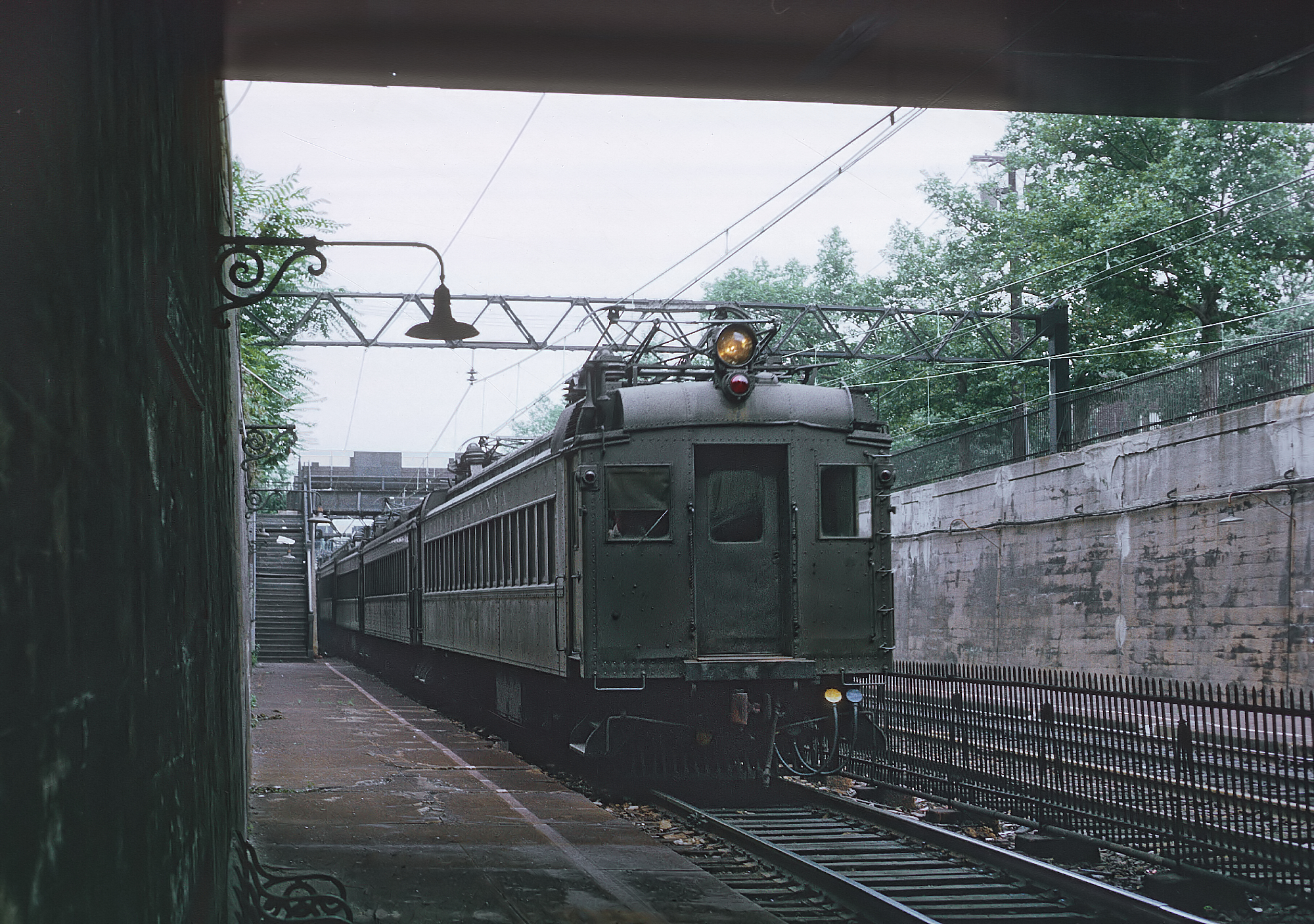
An Erie-Lackawanna train at Roseville Avenue in 1969

During the ownership of the Delaware, Lackawanna and Western Railroad, Roseville Avenue prospered, soon receiving sixty-eight stops by trains daily. This caught attention during a 1913 complaint to the New Jersey Board of Public Utilities by Charles McCausland. The major complaint from McCausland cited that the Lackawanna was not providing quality seating service on trains that stop at Roseville, and several which led to overcrowding, while several bypassing trains did not suffer from such effects. The plaintiff, McCausland, cited that the need for the sixty-eight trains was "additional but unnecessary". The Board of Public Utility Commissioners did not justify any changes or wrongdoing by the railroad, and as a result, no changes to service were made at Roseville Avenue.

The station continued receiving major service over the next five decades, but by 1966, fewer trains stopped at the station, with limited daily service to the station past the 4:33 p.m. train from Hoboken Terminal. Six years later, on June 24, 1972, the Erie–Lackawanna Railroad, who now maintained the station, announced further cutbacks on station service, axing twenty-three train stops at Roseville Avenue for both directions of service. The changes were made as part of major commuter service appropriations and the lack of patronage at the station. From that point, Roseville Avenue went from 37 westbound trains to 14, while eastbound was cut from 37 to 16. Service on Saturdays were cut to flag stops only, while the station received no Sunday service at all. On April 1, 1976, the Erie–Lackawanna Railroad became defunct, and merged into Consolidated Rail Corporation (Conrail), with service sponsored by the New Jersey Department of Transportation.

=== New Jersey Transit use and eventual closure ===
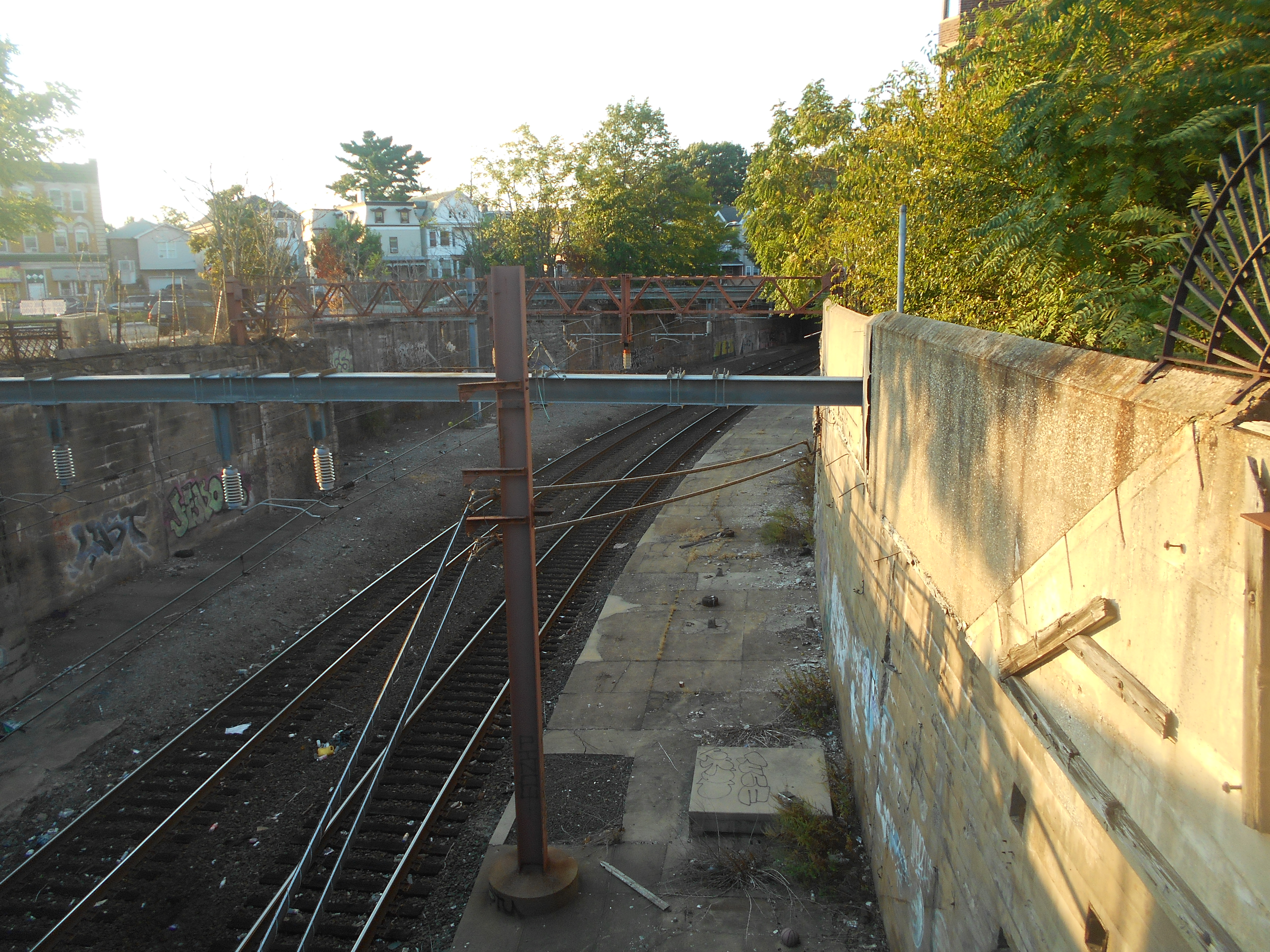
Roseville Avenue's former Montclair Branch platforms in September 2014, 30 years after closing

After the takeover of service along the former Morris & Essex Lines by New Jersey Transit from Conrail in 1982, the service at the Roseville Avenue station remained minimal. Many trains bypassed the station in favor of going to the nearby Newark Broad Street Station. Trains continued to serve the Roseville Avenue station throughout 1982 and 1983, and service continued to be condensed during 1984. However, as of the official September 1984 timetables, service was cut from Roseville Avenue in favor of Newark Broad Street to Grove Street, East Orange (on the Morris & Essex) or Ampere (on the Montclair Branch), both of which closed in April 1991. On September 16, 1984, trains began bypassing Roseville Avenue, and the station was closed permanently. Although the station was closed, Roseville Tower, for the interlocking between the Montclair Branch and Morris & Essex Lines, remained in service for almost two more decades. In 2002, during construction of the Montclair Connection, the tower was demolished in favor of expanding the cut in Roseville for a second track of the new Montclair-Boonton Line.
