= Roseville, Newark =

Populated place in Essex County, New Jersey, US

Coordinates: 40°45′29″N 74°11′20″W

Roseville is a neighborhood in the city of Newark in Essex County, in the U.S. state of New Jersey. It borders Bloomfield and East Orange. To the neighborhood's immediate east is the Newark City Subway and Branch Brook Park. Roseville is divided into Upper Roseville north of 3rd Ave and Lower Roseville south of 3rd Ave.

Originally called "Rowesville," Roseville was farmland at the time of the Civil War, but during the conflict most of the area was turned into Union Army training and camping grounds. The original location of the beginning of Roseville is Lower Roseville. This area includes a small area between 7th Avenue to the north, Central Avenue to the south, West Market Street to the west, and 1st Street to the east. Roseville farmland had many boiling springs at the time. This area was the original settlement of Roseville from surveyed land on Cyrus Peck’s farm. There was even a large park called Roseville Park before being surveyed and parceled off. Many of the homes in this area are Victorian-era brownstones and row-homes built in the mid-1800’s. There are also many Victorian mini-mansions in the area.

Residential development began with the construction of Newark's first streetcar line in 1862, and expanded greatly in the 1880s. Growth was also spurred by the Delaware, Lackawanna, & Western Railroad, which maintained a train station in Roseville for many years (closed in 1982 by New Jersey Transit). For generations, Roseville received Newarkers who had acquired the prosperity to leave the crowded tenements of the Ironbound and the central part of the city.

At the turn of the century, the northern section of the district was predominantly Irish-American, but the rest of the neighborhood was not associated with any single ethnic group. Most of the residents, however, were Catholic and St. Rose of Lima Church was an important part of neighborhood life. In the 1950s and 1960s, the proportion of African American residents increased. However, since the 1980s, increasing numbers of Hispanic families have moved into the neighborhood, hailing from Puerto Rico, Dominican Republic and various Latin American mainland countries.

From 1929 to 1964 Roseville was Newark Academy's third home. The school had a large campus on First Street, between Seventh Avenue and Orange Street. The building was torn down in 1965 and replaced by Garden Spires, two high rise brick apartment buildings.

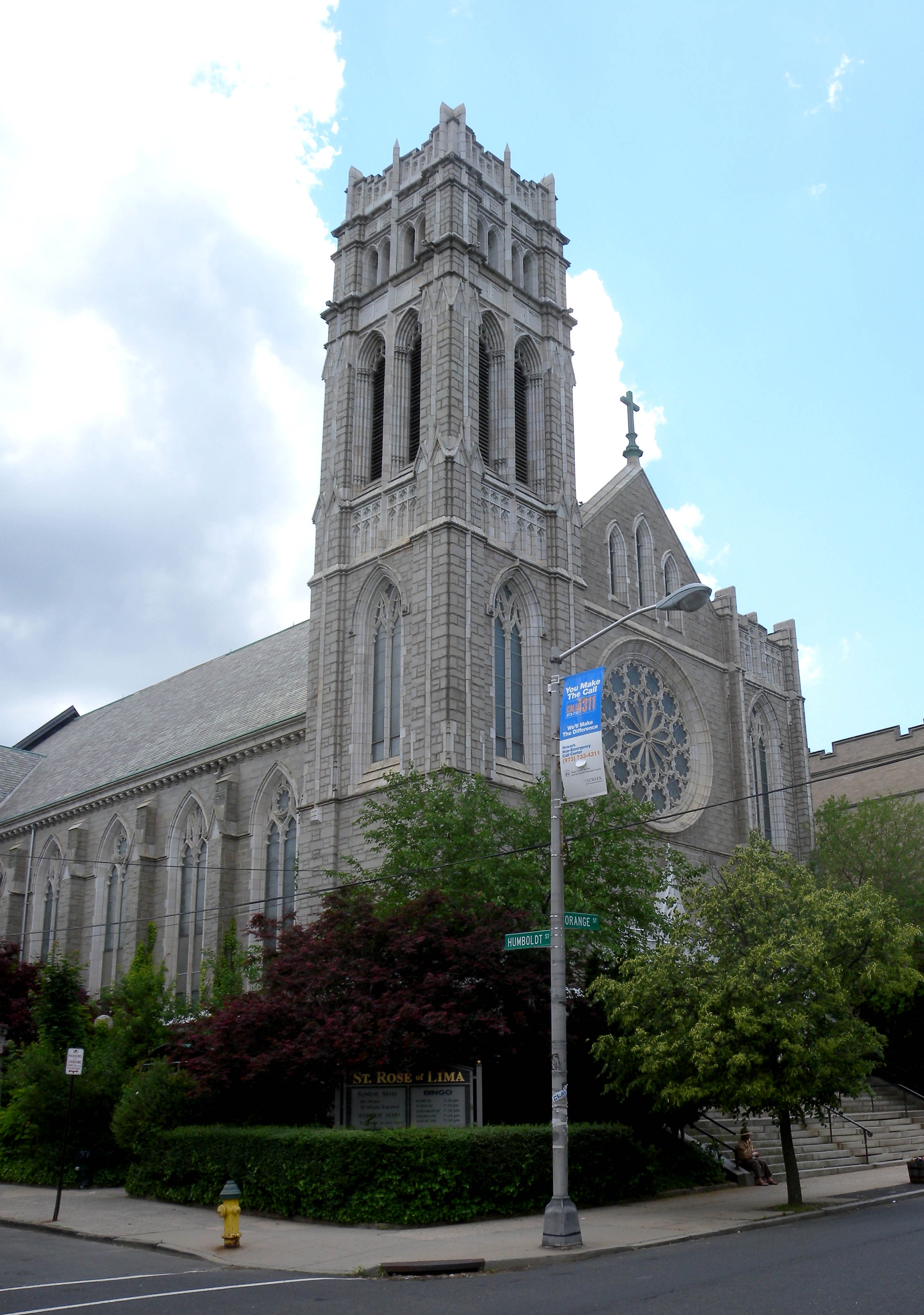
St Rose of Lima Church

Roseville has a tradition of community organization. In 1930 the citizens of Roseville founded the Roseville Community Council, the first grass-roots neighborhood improvement society in Newark. In the wake of the 1967 Newark civil unrest, the pastor of St. Rose of Lima Church, Monsignor William J. Linder, founded the New Community Corporation, a non-profit organization providing job training, housing and medical care.

A major landmark of Roseville is Newark Schools Stadium, located at the corner of Roseville Avenue and Bloomfield Avenue. There are also many Italian restaurants along Bloomfield Avenue.

Roseville is served by the Orange Street, Park Avenue and Bloomfield Avenue Stations of Newark City Subway.

Educational institutions include: First Avenue Elementary School, Dr. William. H. Horton School, Alma Flagg Elementary School, Abington Avenue School, Sussex Avenue School, Roseville Avenue School, Newark Preschool, St. Rose of Lima School, and St. Frances Xavier School. Sussex Avenue School, Abington Avenue School, and the former Roseville Avenue School are some of the oldest schools in the city.

The historic Roseville Presbyterian Church, incorporated in 1854, is located on Roseville Ave between I-280 and Sussex Avenue. This church was created by donated land from Cyrus Peck, the original owner of the farmland surrounding the area. Cyrus Peck’s house was later donated to Roseville Presbyterian Church and later on demolished in 1973. The house was located on 5th Street, 6th Street, and Sussex Avenue. Across the street from Roseville Presbyterian Church is the old St. Barnabas' Episcopal Church which was originally started by middle class residents from nearby East Orange and is now a predominantly African American congregation. On October 1, 1853, Cyrus Peck and his wife deeded the triangular piece of land to the church a year after its settlement.

Roseville is served by two public library branches: Roseville branch for Lower Roseville and the First Avenue branch for Upper Roseville. Roseville branch is located directly across the street from the former Peck House at 99 N. 5th Street.

== Notable people ==
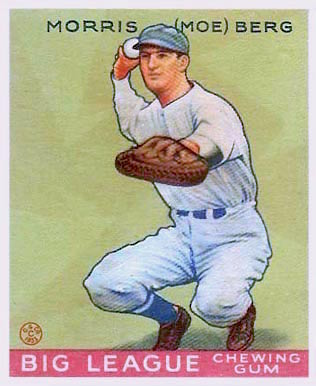
Moe Berg

- Moe Berg (1902–1972), baseball player and spy for the Office of Strategic Services and Central Intelligence Agency

== See also ==
- Roseville Avenue (NJT station)
