= Roseville Presbyterian Church =

Coordinates: 40°45′8″N 74°11′34″W

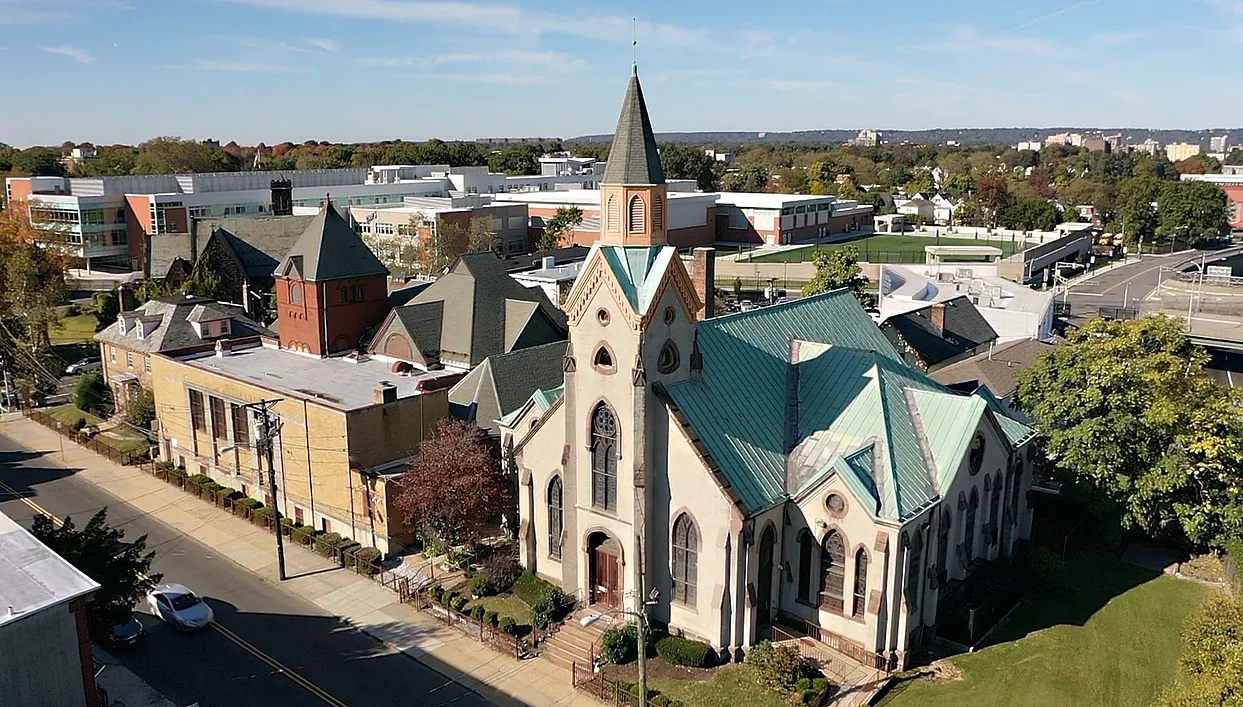
- The church in 2019
- Roseville Presbyterian Church
- Location: 36 Roseville Avenue, Newark, New Jersey

Architecture
- Architect(s): Frank F. Ward of Ward & Davis
- Completed: 1867

Roseville Presbyterian Church, also known as Roseville United Presbyterian Church, is a church at Roseville & Sussex Avenues in Newark, New Jersey, United States. It was organized and dedicated in 1854 and its current Sanctuary was built in 1867.

== History ==
The church began in 1852 as Sunday school classes, held at North 7th & Orange Streets, in "Rowe's Village", present day neighborhood of Roseville. In 1853, Aaron Peck, who owned most of present-day Roseville, donated the land on Roseville Avenue, where a small frame church was erected.

On April 9, 1854, Roseville Presbyterian Church was incorporated by the Newark Presbytery and on April 27, Dr. John F Pingry was installed as the first pastor.

In 1867, the center portion of the present sanctuary was built. Designed by Frank F. Ward of Ward & Davis, It was enlarged with wings on either side in 1875. After using the original frame building as a Sunday school house, it was removed and the present red brick building, known as the "Education building" was erected.

In 1907, the building which would eventually house the chapel (and later renovated to house offices and a conference room), was built adjacent to the Education building and connected to the Sanctuary.

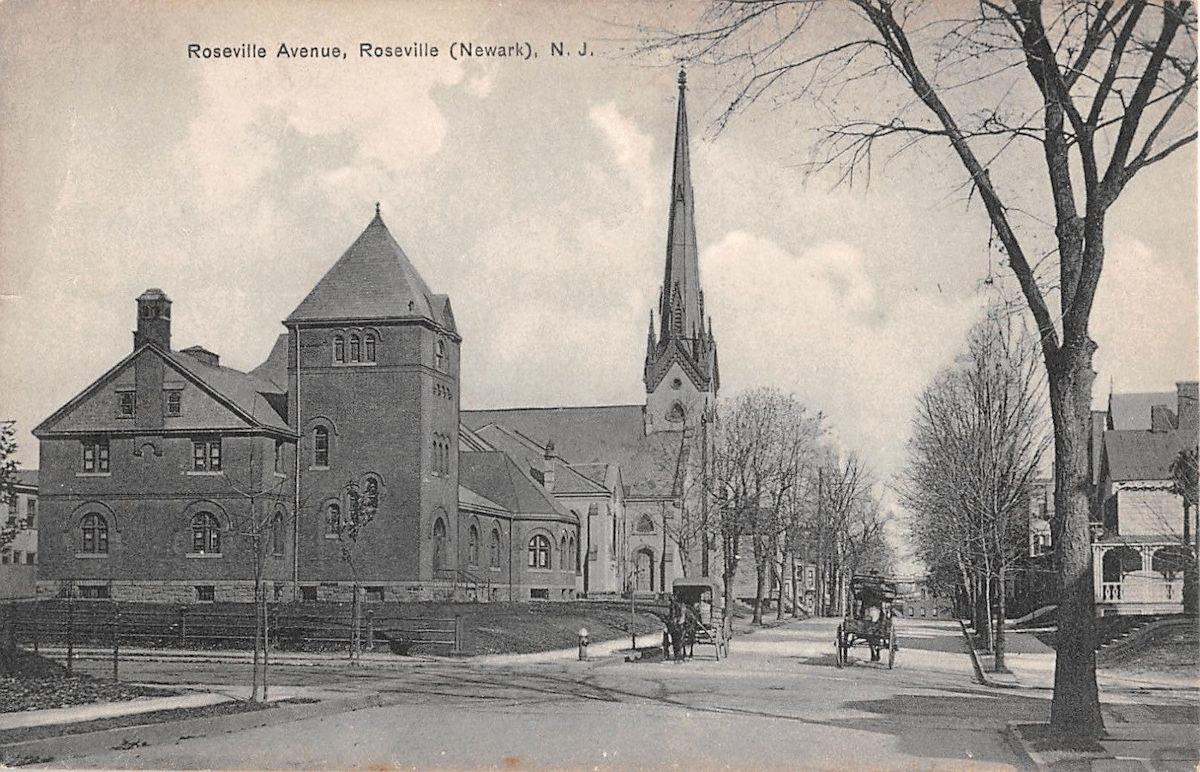
Roseville Presbyterian Church, before the addition of the Manse and Kitchen, 1800s

In 1913, the Manse was built directly on the corner of Sussex & Roseville Avenues and the kitchen was added to the Education building.

In 1924, Fewsmith Memorial Church at 34 Hudson St merged its 168 members into the congregation.

At the death of Ms. Edith Peck in 1935, the church was bequeathed the homestead of Cyrus Peck. The Peck family were longtime members and benefactors to the church.

Sherrill Hall, the last of the major buildings added to the campus, was completed in 1954 along with a new steeple after a fire destroyed the original.

== Pastors ==
Roseville has been served by 11 pastors.

- 1854 - 1860: Dr. John F. Pingry
  - Resigned to establish The Pingry School.
- 1860 - 1903: Dr. Charles T. Haley
- 1905 - 1924: Dr. William Young Chapman
  - Resigned to become President of Bloomfield College & Seminary
- 1924 - 1956: Dr. Walter L. Wallon
- 1957 - 1964: Rev. Leonard Evans
- 1965 - 1972: Rev. Kenneth Blaine Cragg
- 1973 - 1976: Rev. Howard Bryant
- 1978 - 1987: Rev. Oliver Brown II
- 1992 - 1994: Rev. Marvin Williams
- 1997 - 2015: Rev. Doris Glaspy
- 2021 – present: Rev. Toure C. Marshall

=== Interim pastors ===
- 1956 - 1956: Dr. Henry Strock
- 1972 - 1973: Dale Tremper
- 2016 - 2021: Rev. Danny Mitchell
