= Ahlus Sunnah School =

Muslim school in Essex County, New Jersey, United States

Location
- 215 North Oraton Parkway; East Orange, Essex County, New Jersey 07017; United States
- 40.765173°N 74.205854°W

Information
- Type: Islamic school
- Established: 1997
- NCES School ID: A9303611
- Principal: Brother Amin
- Faculty: 28 FTEs
- Grades: PreK - 12
- Enrollment: 117 (plus 25 in PreK, as of 2017–18)
- Student to teacher ratio: 4.2:1
- Hours in school day: 7.2
- Website: thesunnah.org/school

Ahlus Sunnah School is an Islamic school located in East Orange, New Jersey. Founded in 2005, the school serves students in grades PreK-12.

As of the 2017–18 school year, the school had an enrollment of 117 students (plus 25 in PreK) and 28 classroom teachers (on an FTE basis), for a student–teacher ratio of 4.2:1. The school's student body was 47.0% (55) Black, 19.7% (23) Asian, 17.1% (20) White, 13.7% (16) two or more races and 0.9% (1) Hispanic.
