= East Orange station =

NJ Transit rail station

East Orange
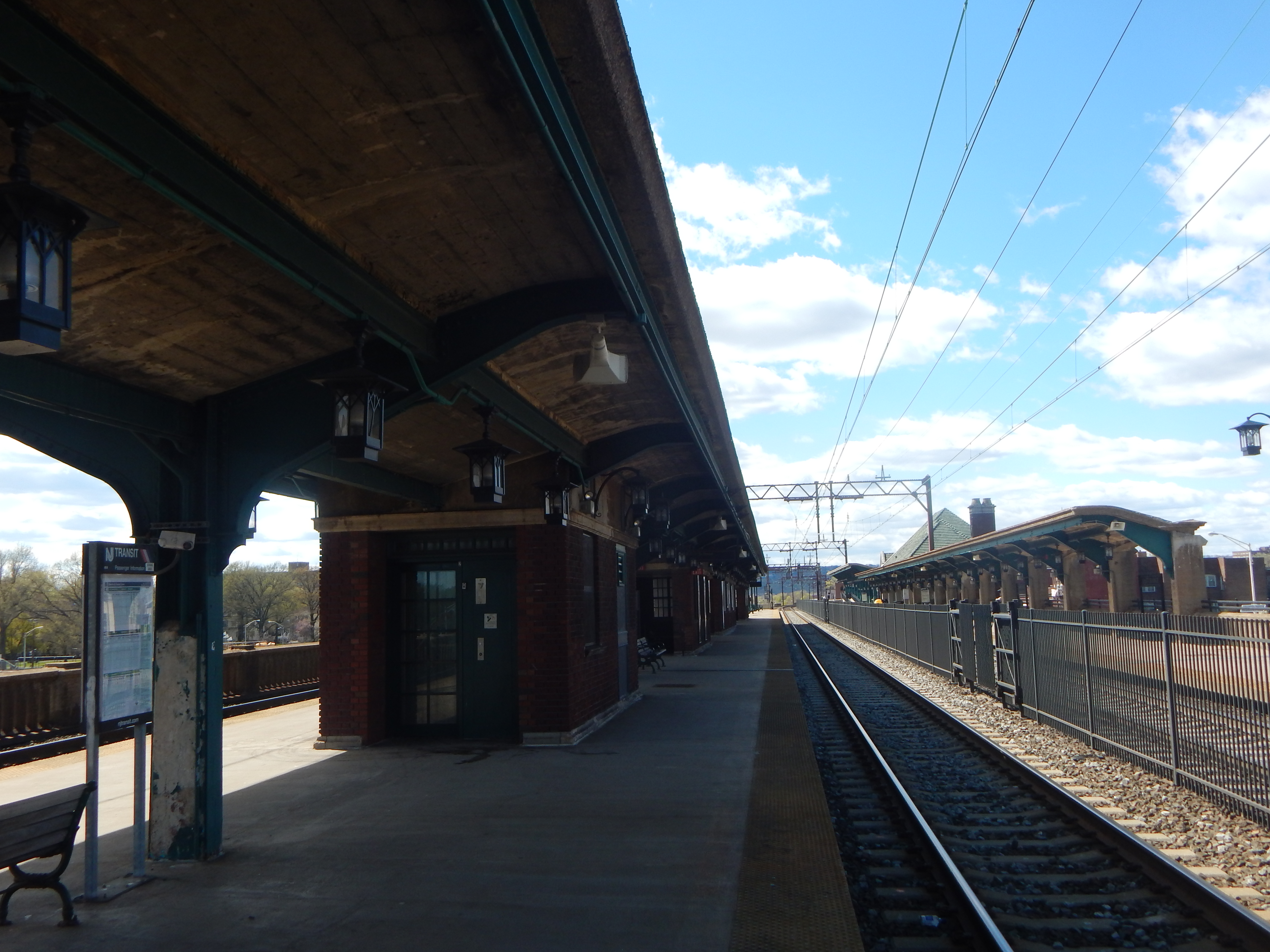
- The East Orange station in April 2015, facing toward Brick Church.

General information
- Location: 65 City Hall Plaza, East Orange, New Jersey
- Owner: New Jersey Transit
- Platforms: 1 side platform and 1 island platform
- Tracks: 3
- Connections: NJT Bus: 21, 71, 73, 79, and 94; Community Coach: 77

Construction
- Accessible: yes

Other information
- Fare zone: 4

History
- Opened: November 19, 1836
- Rebuilt: April 21, 1921–December 18, 1922
- Electrified: September 22, 1930
- Former names: Orange Junction

Passengers
- 2025: 434 (average weekday)
- Rank: 67 of 153

Services
Preceding station	NJ Transit	Following station
Brick Church toward Gladstone	Gladstone Branch weekdays	Newark Broad Street toward New York or Hoboken
Brick Church toward Hackettstown	Morristown Line	Newark Broad Street toward New York or Hoboken
Former services
Preceding station	NJ Transit	Following station
Brick Church toward Gladstone	Gladstone Branch until April 7, 1991	Grove Street toward New York or Hoboken
Brick Church toward Hackettstown	Morristown Line until April 7, 1991	Grove Street toward New York or Hoboken
Preceding station	Delaware, Lackawanna and Western Railroad	Following station
Brick Church toward Buffalo	Main Line	Grove Street toward Hoboken
- East Orange Station
- U.S. National Register of Historic Places
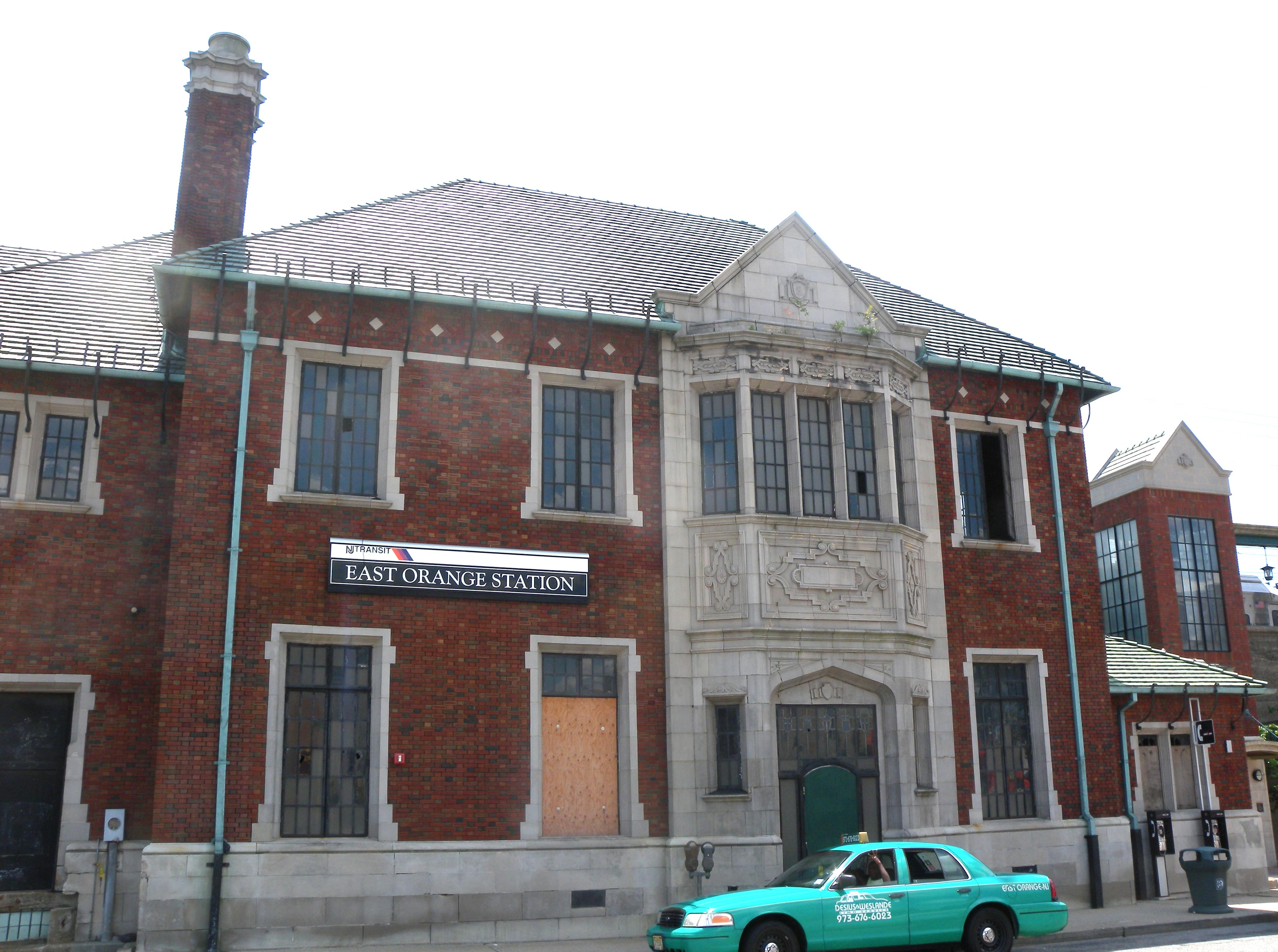
- East Orange station depot
- Coordinates: 40°45′40.8″N 74°12′39.5″W
- Built: 1921
- Architect: F.W. Nies
- Architectural style: Tudor Revival, Jacobethan Revival
- MPS: Operating Passenger Railroad Stations TR
- NRHP reference No.: 84002638
- Added to NRHP: June 22, 1984
Location

East Orange is an active commuter railroad train station in the city of East Orange, Essex County, New Jersey. Located next to East Orange City Hall, the station serves trains on the two lines that make up New Jersey Transit's Morris and Essex Lines: the Morristown Line and Gladstone Branch. Trains heading east to New York Penn Station and Hoboken Terminal stop at Newark Broad Street Station next, while trains heading west towards Gladstone and Hackettstown stop at Brick Church station. East Orange station contains two platforms (one side platform and one island platform) to service three active tracks. The station is accessible for handicapped persons per the Americans with Disabilities Act of 1990.

Service in East Orange began on November 19, 1836 when the Morris and Essex Railroad opened to Orange. Originally the station was known as Orange Junction as the name East Orange was assigned to the now-closed Grove Street station to the east. The current station at the location opened on December 18, 1922 when the Delaware, Lackawanna and Western Railroad completed an elevation project of the tracks through the city. The headhouse at East Orange station were added to the New Jersey and National Registers of Historic Places in 1984 as part of the Operating Passenger Railroad Stations Thematic Resource.

== History ==
Station owner New Jersey Transit decided to perform work at East Orange station to improve accessibility for the handicapped and to repair eighty-year-old viaducts at the station. At a cost of $22.9 million, repair work at East Orange, along with nearby station Brick Church commenced in 2004. East Orange received a mini-high level platform, the tracks surrounding the station were upgraded with concrete ties and the stairways leading to the platforms were replaced.

== Station layout ==
The station has two low-level platforms serving all three tracks.

== See also ==
- List of New Jersey Transit stations

== Bibliography ==
- Douglass, A.M. (1912). The Railroad Trainman, Volume 29. Cleveland, Ohio: Brotherhood of Railroad Trainmen.
