= Grove Street station (NJ Transit) =

Railway station in New Jersey, US

Coordinates: 40°45′29.5″N 74°12′8.1″W

Grove Street

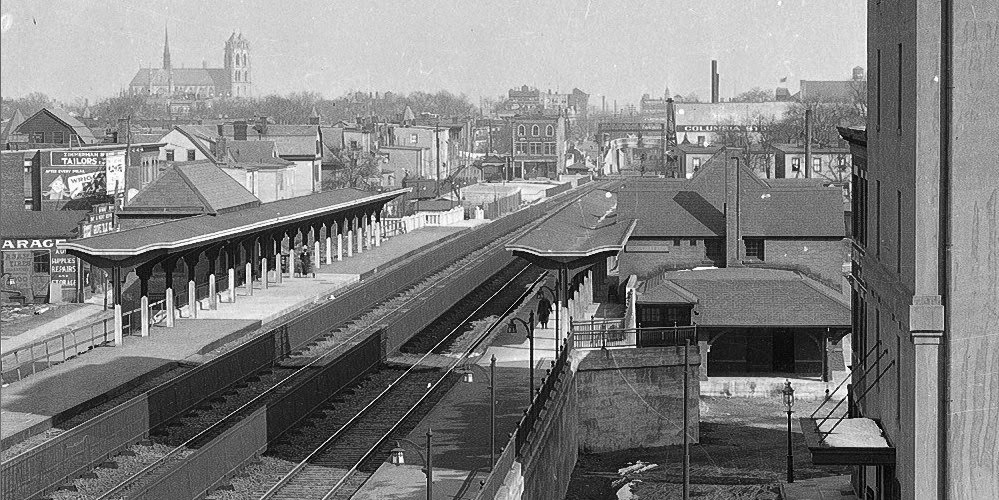
- Grove Street station shortly after the tracks were elevated in 1922.

General information
- Location: Grove Street and Main Street in East Orange, New Jersey
- Owner: New Jersey Transit
- Line: Gladstone Branch Morristown Line
- Platforms: 2 side platforms
- Tracks: 3

Other information
- Station code: 406 (Delaware, Lackawanna and Western)

History
- Opened: November 19th, 1836 (M&E Railroad)
- Closed: April 7, 1991
- Rebuilt: 1903, 1922 (DL&W)
- Electrified: September 22, 1930
- Former names: East Orange

Former services
Preceding station	NJ Transit	Following station
East Orange toward Hackettstown	Morristown Line	Roseville Avenue toward New York or Hoboken
East Orange toward Gladstone	Gladstone Branch	Roseville Avenue toward New York or Hoboken
Preceding station	Delaware, Lackawanna and Western Railroad	Following station
East Orange toward Buffalo	Main Line	Roseville Avenue toward Hoboken
Location

Grove Street was a NJ Transit station in East Orange, Essex County, in the U.S. state of New Jersey, along the Morris & Essex Lines. The station was first built in 1836 by the Morris & Essex Railroad. Service on the direct site began on November 19th, 1836 (when the Morris & Essex Railroad and its service between Newark and Orange launched), though no main station complex was built until 1901. The station was then demolished in favor of a brick complex, which was completed in 1901 and opened in 1903 by the Delaware, Lackawanna and Western Railroad (DL&W).

The station was originally designated as "East Orange" when it opened, though would be renamed to Grove Street when the city of East Orange split from the city of Orange in 1863. In turn, neighboring station Orange Junction was given the East Orange designation. The 1901 brick station depot was reconstructed into a two-story complex after the DL&W elevated tracking through East Orange in 1922. Due to low ridership, and structural deterioration, NJ Transit discontinued rail service to Grove Street on April 7, 1991, alongside Ampere station (also in East Orange). The entire station was demolished in 1995.

== Gallery ==
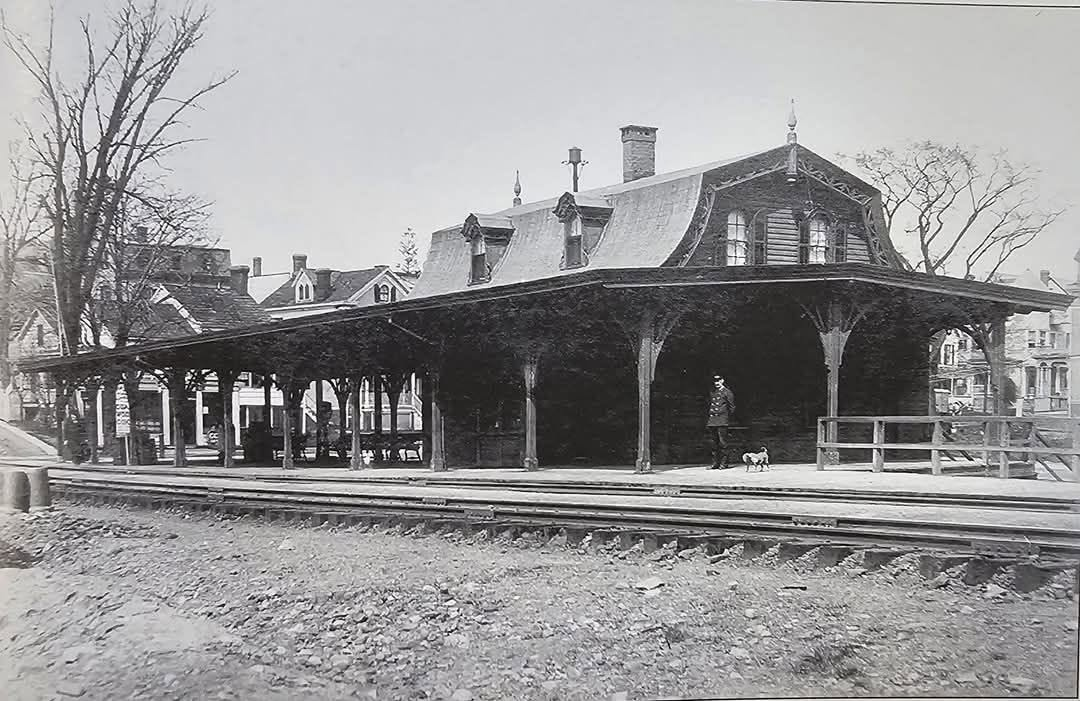
M&E Railroad Grove Street station in 1885.

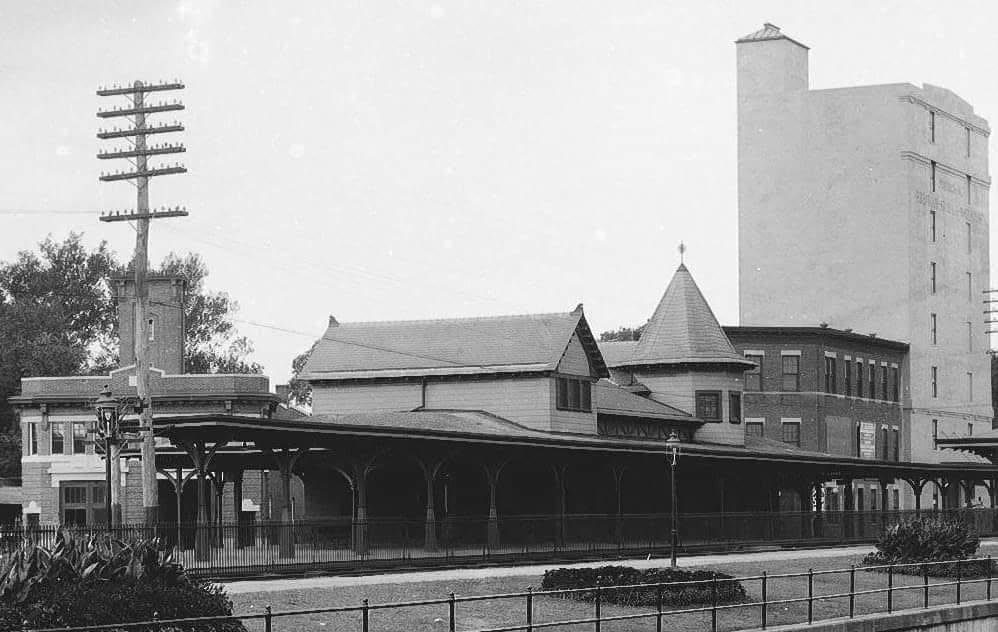
Grove Street station in 1913.

Grove Street station reconstruction during the DL&W track elevation through East Orange in the 1920s. in 1885.

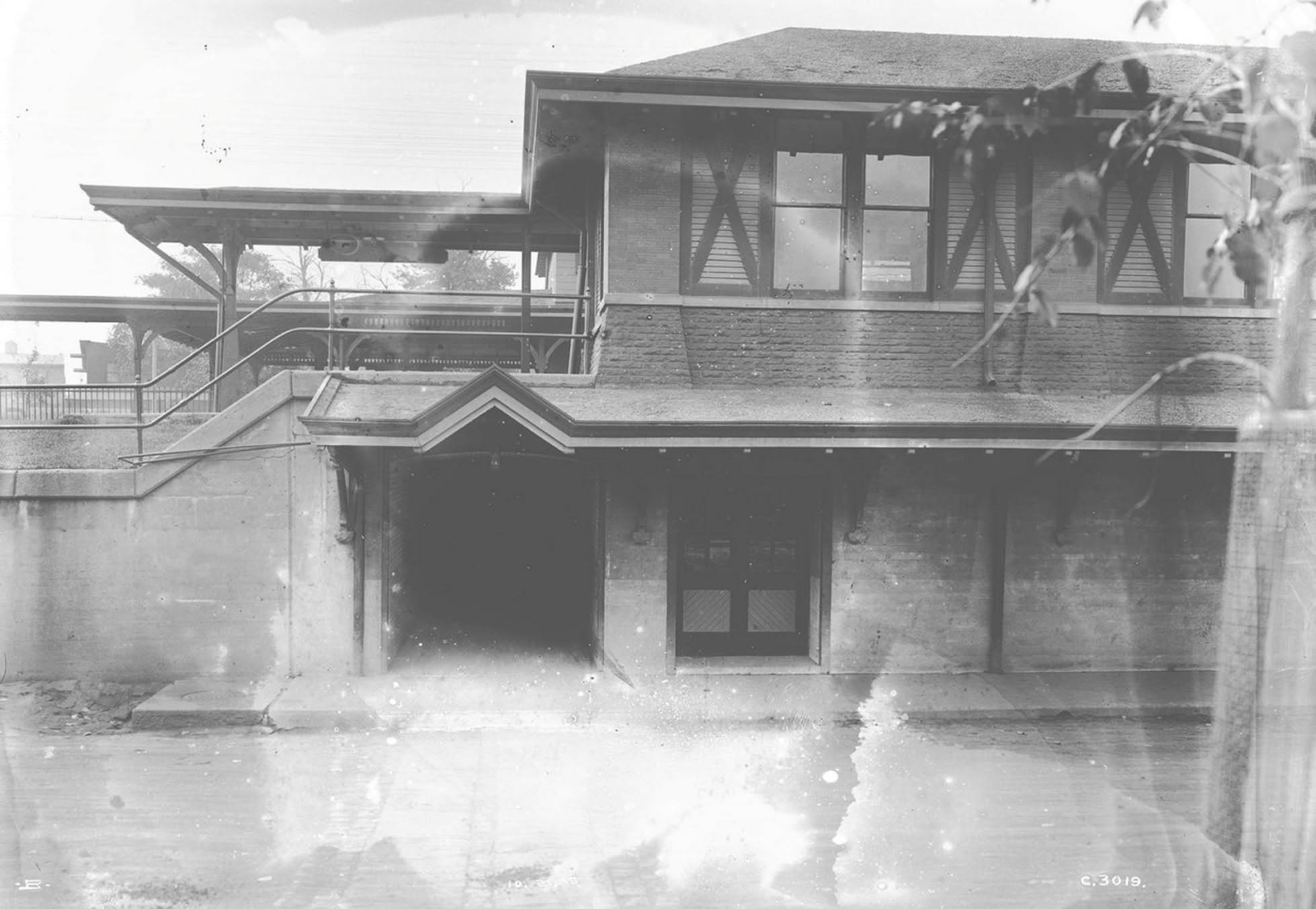
Updated eastbound portion of Grove Street Station, 1924.

Grove Street station reconstruction during the DL&W track elevation through East Orange in the 1920s. in 1885.

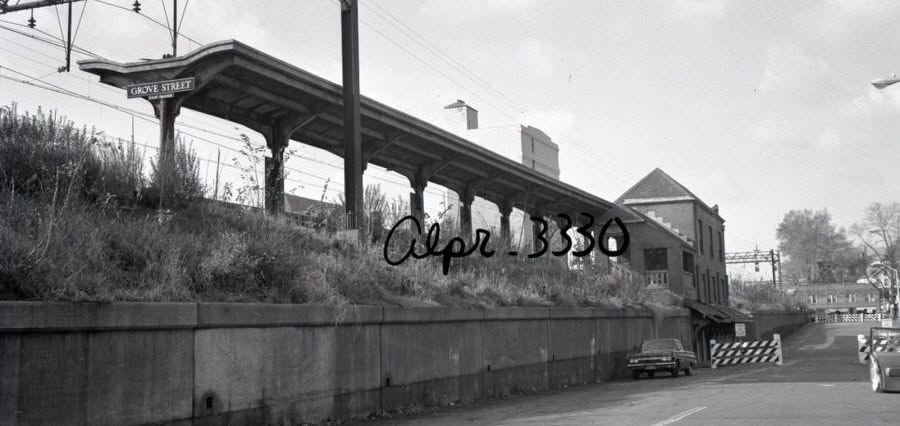
Grove Street station from Eaton Place, 1971.

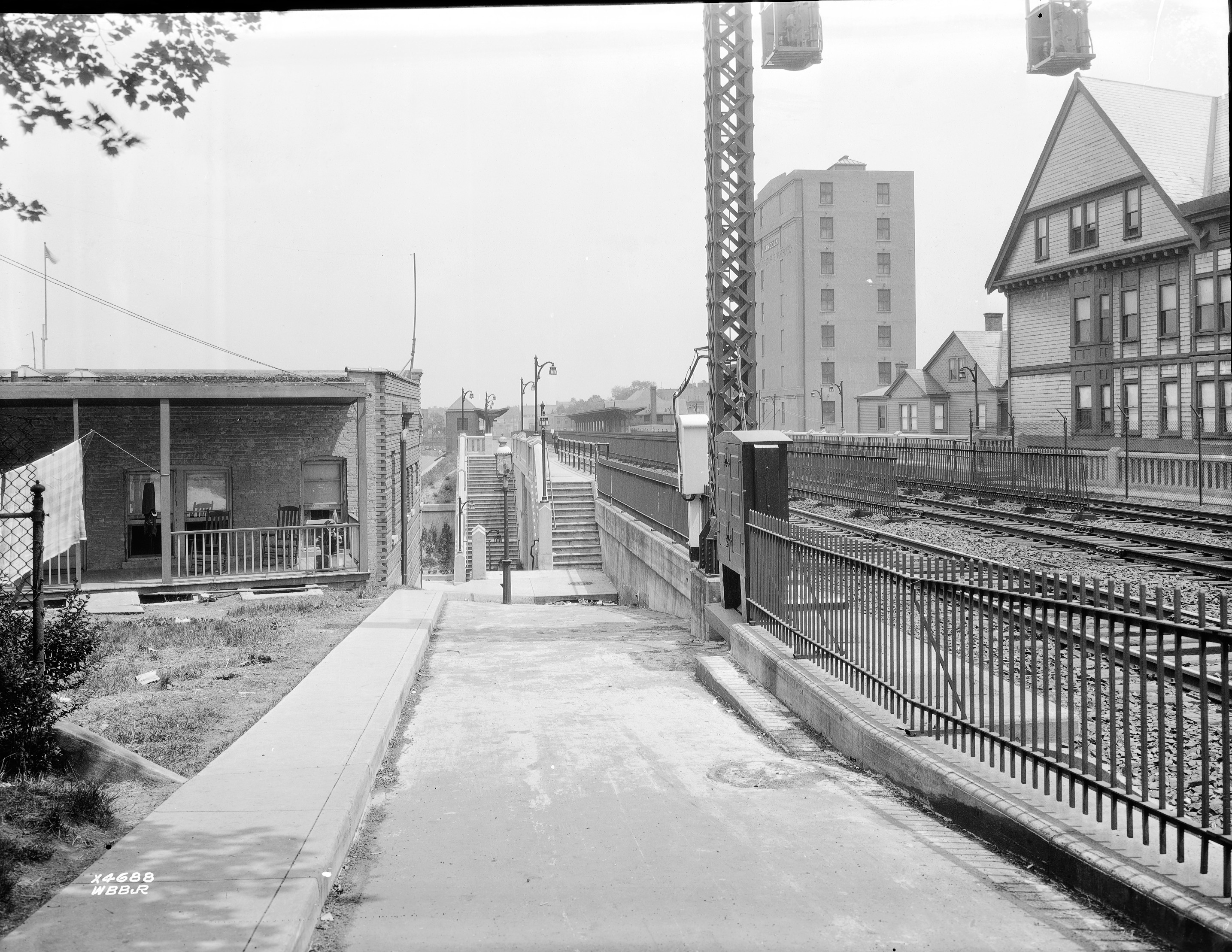
Grove Street station from Church Place, 1928.

Grove Street station depot sketch.

Grove Street station depot, taken from Main Street/ Dr. Martin Luther King Jr. Boulevard, 1974.

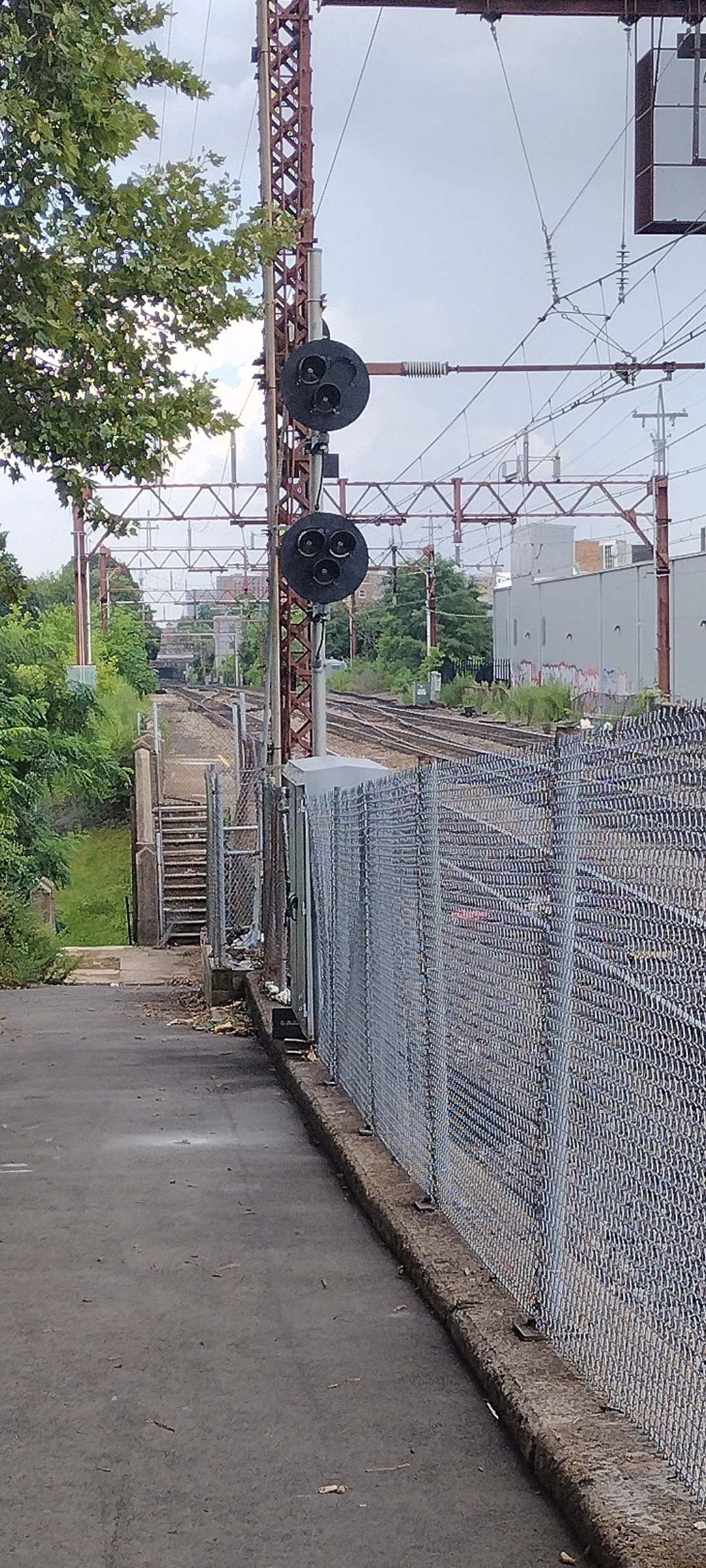
Grove Street station from Church Place, July 2026

The site of Grove Street station now houses the Fantin Supply warehouse, October 2026.

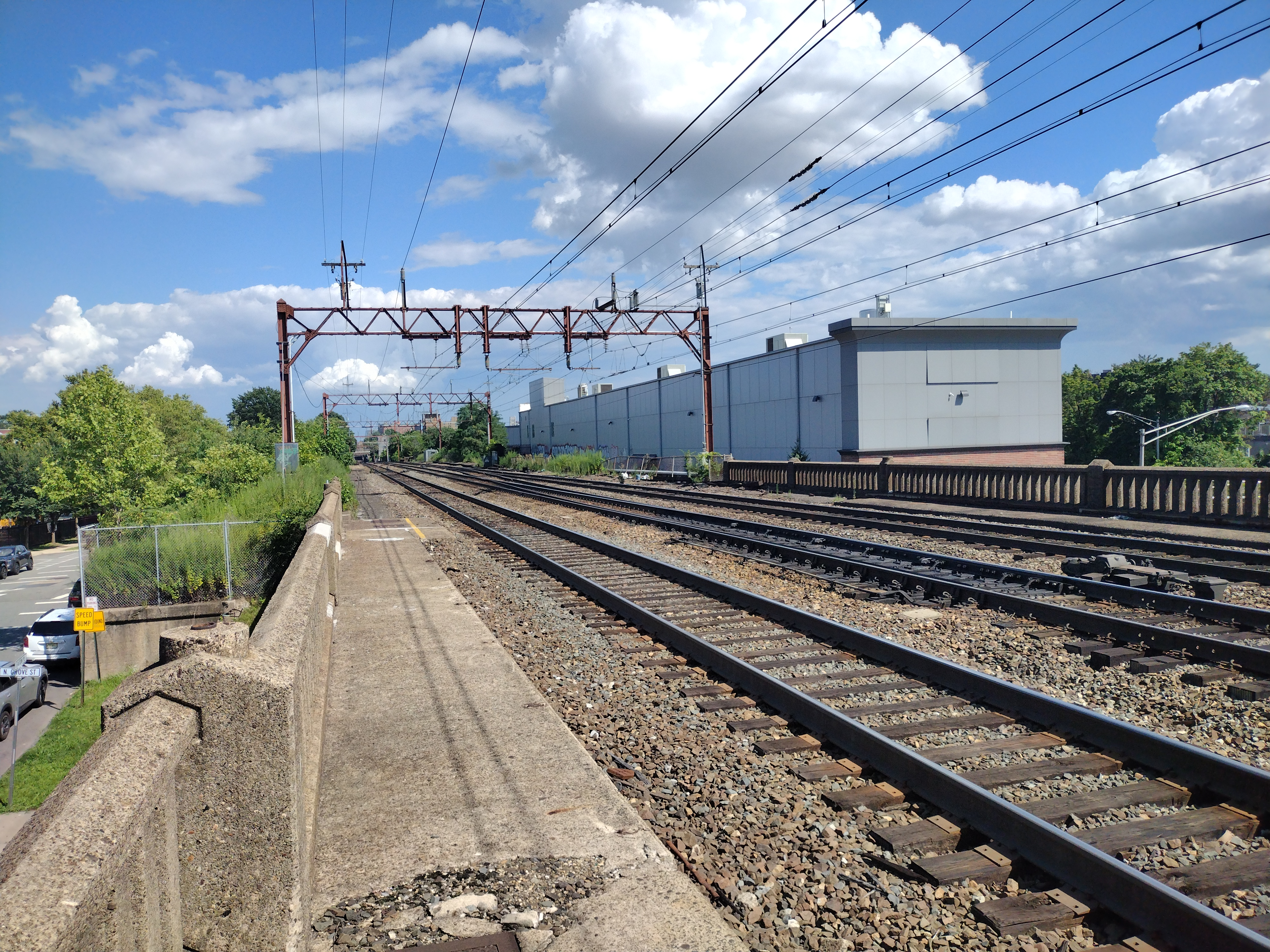
The current site of Grove Street station in East Orange, NJ, facing Newark. Yellow safety lines are still visible on some platforms, with more platforms in the far distance.
