= East Orange, New Jersey =

City in Essex County, New Jersey, US

- City
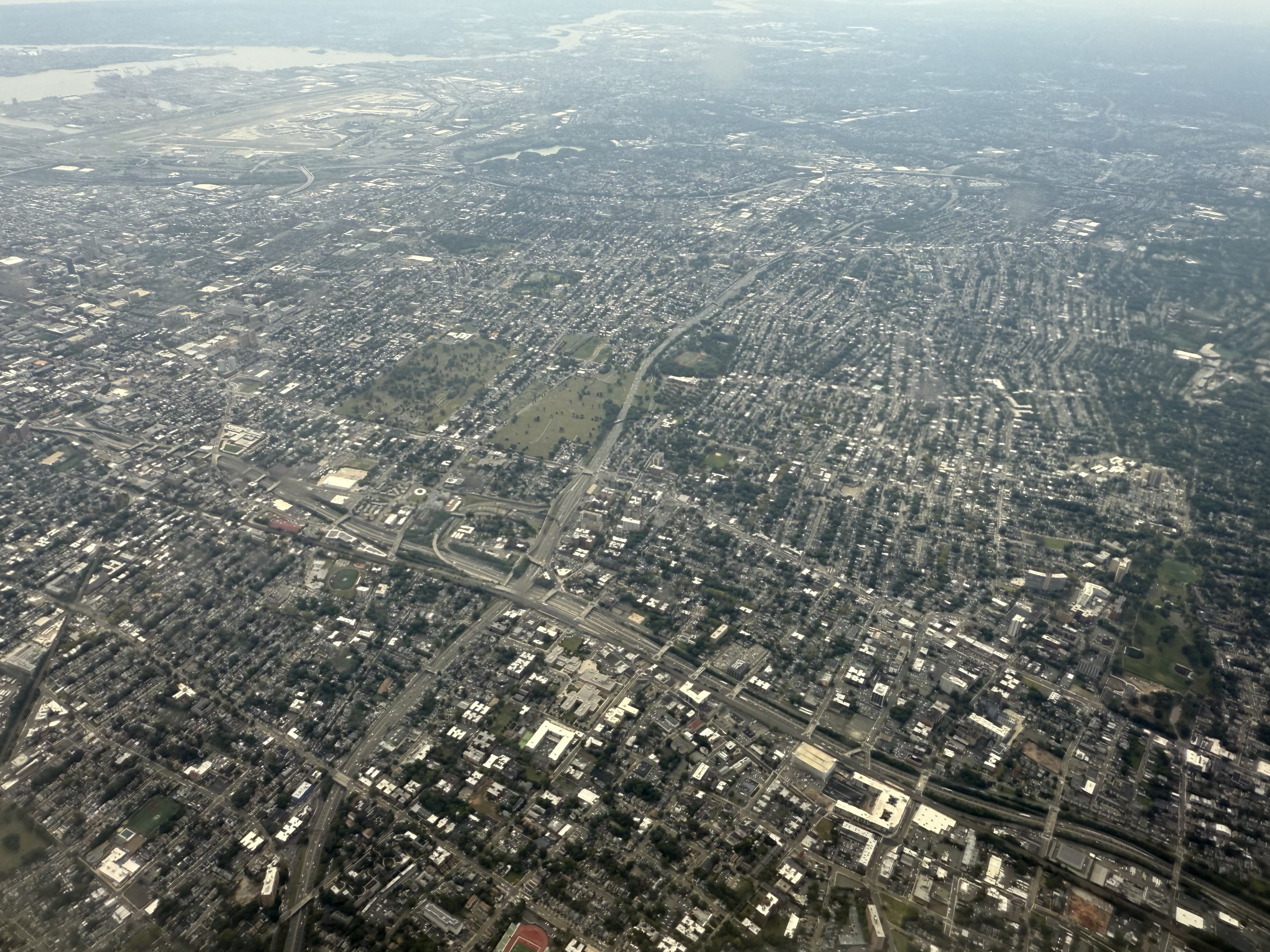
- Aerial view of East Orange

- Seal
- Interactive map of East Orange, New Jersey
- Location in Essex County Location in New Jersey Location in the United States
- Coordinates: 40.765055°N 74.211655°W
- Country: United States
- State: New Jersey
- County: Essex
- Incorporated: March 4, 1863; 163 years ago

Government
  - Type: City
  - Body: City Council
  - Mayor: Theodore R. "Ted" Green (D, term ends December 31, 2029)
  - Administrator: Jean-Guy Lauture (acting)
  - Municipal clerk: Cynthia Brown

Area
  - Total: 3.93 sq mi (10.17 km^{2})
  - Land: 3.93 sq mi (10.17 km^{2})
  - Water: 0 sq mi (0.00 km^{2}) 0.00%
  - Rank: 301st of 565 in state 10th of 22 in county
- Elevation: 177 ft (54 m)

Population (2020)
  - Total: 69,612
  - Estimate (2024): 71,850
  - Rank: 544th in country (as of 2023); 17th of 565 in state 2nd of 22 in county
  - Density: 17,722/sq mi (6,843/km^{2})
  - Rank: 13th of 565 in state 2nd of 22 in county
- Time zone: UTC−05:00 (Eastern (EST))
  - Summer (DST): UTC−04:00 (Eastern (EDT))
- ZIP Codes: 07017–07019
- Area code: 973
- FIPS code: 3401319390
- GNIS feature ID: 0885200
- Website: eastorange-nj.gov

East Orange is a city in Essex County, in the U.S. state of New Jersey. As of the 2020 United States census, the city's population was 69,612, an increase of 5,342 (+8.3%) from the 2010 census count of 64,270, which in turn reflected a decline of 5,554 (−8.0%) from the 69,824 counted in the 2000 census. The city was the state's 17th most populous municipality in 2020, after having been ranked 20th in 2010 and 14th statewide in 2000. The Census Bureau's Population Estimates Program calculated a population of 69,556 for 2023, making it the 544th-most populous municipality in the nation.

== History ==
East Orange had its origins in Connecticut's New Haven Colony. In 1666, a group of 30 of New Haven's families traveled by water to found "a town on the Passayak" River. They arrived on territory now encompassing Newark, the Oranges, and several other municipalities. The area was situated in the northeast portion of a land grant conveyed by King Charles II of England to his brother James, Duke of York. In 1664, James conveyed the land to two proprietors, Lord John Berkeley and Sir George Carteret. Since Carteret had been Royal Governor of the Isle of Jersey, the territory became known as New Jersey.

East Orange was initially a part of Newark and was originally known as Newark Mountains. On June 7, 1780, the townspeople of Newark Mountains officially voted to adopt the name Orange. At the time, there was a significant number of people in favor of secession from Newark. However, this would not occur until November 27, 1806, when the territory now encompassing all of the Oranges was finally detached. On April 13, 1807, the first government was elected, but not until March 13, 1860, was Orange officially incorporated as a city. Immediately, the new city began fragmenting into smaller communities, primarily because of local disputes about the costs of establishing paid police, fire, and street departments. South Orange was organized on January 26, 1861; Fairmount (later to become part of West Orange) on March 11, 1862; East Orange on March 4, 1863; and West Orange (including Fairmount) on March 14, 1863. East Orange was reincorporated as a city on December 9, 1899, based on the results of a referendum held two days earlier.

East Orange was known, at one time, for the shade trees that lined the city's residential streets. This is still evident today, as many of the tall trees still stand.

== Geography ==
According to the U.S. Census Bureau, the city had a total area of 3.93 square miles (10.17 km^{2}), all of which was land.

East Orange shares borders with the Essex County municipalities of Newark to the east and south, South Orange to the southwest, Orange to the west, and Glen Ridge and Bloomfield to the north.

Unincorporated communities, localities and place names located partially or completely within the city include Ampere and Brick Church.

=== Neighborhoods ===
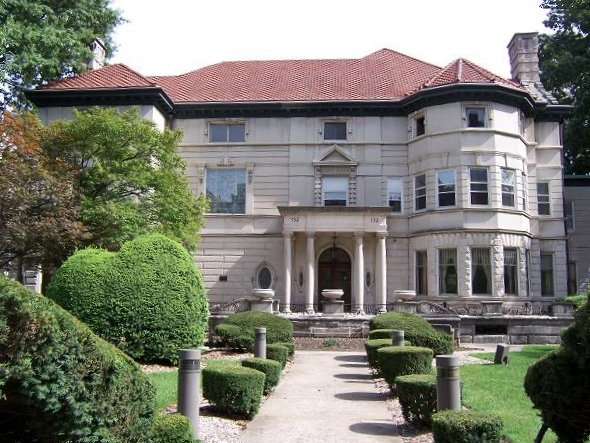
A reminder of East Orange's former wealth. The Ambrose-Ward Mansion was built in 1898 for a book manufacturer, now the home of the African-American Fund of New Jersey.

East Orange is officially divided into five wards, but is also unofficially divided into neighborhoods, still with many well maintained streets and homes.

- Ampere: Anchored by the now defunct train station of the same name, The Ampere section was developed on land owned by Orange Water Works, after the construction of the Crocker Wheeler Company plant spurred development in the area. The station was named in honor of André-Marie Ampère, a pioneer in electrodynamics and reconstructed as a new Renaissance Revival station in 1907 and 1908. Roughly bounded by the Ampere North CDP in Bloomfield to the north, Lawton Street and Newark to the east, 4th Avenue to the south, and North Grove Street to the West.
- Greenwood (Teen Streets): So named after Greenwood Avenue and the "teen" streets that run through it. It is often grouped together with Ampere. This area was severely disturbed by the construction of Interstate 280 and the Garden State Parkway. The Grove Street station of the former Delaware, Lackawanna and Western Railroad was located at Grove and Main streets. Roughly bounded by 4th Avenue to the North, North 15th Street/Newark to the east, Eaton Place/NJ Transit Morris & Essex Lines, and North Grove Street to the eest.
- Presidential Estates: Recently designated due to the streets in this area being named after early presidents of the United States. There are many large well kept homes situated on streets lined with very old, very large shade trees in this neighborhood that are characteristic of the northern section of the city. Roughly Bounded by Bloomfield to the North, Montclair-Boonton Line and North Grove Street to the east, Springdale Avenue to the South and the Garden State Parkway to the West.
- Elmwood: Located in the southeastern part of the city. Elmwood Park serves this section of the city, with 7 tennis courts on Rhode Island Avenue, a basketball court on the corner of Elmwood Avenue and Oak Street, a swimming pool with a pool house, a walking track, a baseball field, a softball field and a renovated field house. The area holds one of the surviving Carnegie Libraries, the Elmwood Branch of the East Orange Public Library, opened in 1912.
- Doddtown (Franklin): Named after John Dodd, who founded and surveyed the area of the "Watsessing Plain". The former campus of Upsala College is located here. It was converted into the new East Orange Campus High School on the east side of Prospect Street, and an adjacent new housing subdivision. Roughly bounded by Bloomfield to the North, the Garden State Parkway to the East, Park Avenue to the South and Orange to the West.

== Demographics ==
Historical population
Census	Pop.	Note	%±
1870	4,315		—
1880	8,349		93.5%
1890	13,282		59.1%
1900	21,506		61.9%
1910	34,371		59.8%
1920	50,710		47.5%
1930	68,020		34.1%
1940	68,945		1.4%
1950	79,340		15.1%
1960	77,259		−2.6%
1970	75,471		−2.3%
1980	77,878		3.2%
1990	73,552		−5.6%
2000	69,824		−5.1%
2010	64,270		−8.0%
2020	69,612		8.3%
2024 (est.)	71,850		3.2%
Population sources: 1870–1920 1870; 1870–1890 1880–1890; 1890–1910 1900–1930; 1940–2000 2000; 2010 2020

=== Racial and ethnic composition ===
East Orange city, New Jersey – Racial and ethnic composition Note: the US Census treats Hispanic/Latino as an ethnic category. This table excludes Latinos from the racial categories and assigns them to a separate category. Hispanics/Latinos may be of any race.
Race / ethnicity (NH = Non-Hispanic)	Pop 1990	Pop 2000	Pop 2010	Pop 2020	% 1990	% 2000	% 2010	% 2020
White alone (NH)	4,596	1,874	1,422	1,388	6.25%	2.68%	2.21%	1.99%
Black or African American alone (NH)	65,098	61,604	55,702	54,689	88.51%	88.23%	86.67%	78.56%
Native American or Alaska Native alone (NH)	287	130	186	164	0.39%	0.19%	0.29%	0.24%
Asian alone (NH)	449	294	436	501	0.61%	0.42%	0.68%	0.72%
Native Hawaiian or Pacific Islander alone (NH)	N/A	37	29	6	N/A	0.05%	0.05%	0.01%
Other race alone (NH)	141	288	335	570	0.19%	0.41%	0.52%	0.82%
Mixed-race or multiracial (NH)	N/A	2,313	1,065	3,262	N/A	3.31%	1.66%	4.69%
Hispanic or Latino (any race)	2,981	3,284	5,095	9,032	4.05%	4.70%	7.93%	12.97%
Total	73,552	69,824	64,270	69,612	100.00%	100.00%	100.00%	100.00%

=== 2020 census ===
As of the 2020 census, East Orange had a population of 69,612. The median age was 36.6 years. 23.0% of residents were under the age of 18 and 13.4% of residents were 65 years of age or older. For every 100 females there were 83.0 males, and for every 100 females age 18 and over there were 77.5 males age 18 and over.

100.0% of residents lived in urban areas, while 0.0% lived in rural areas.

There were 27,410 households in East Orange, of which 31.9% had children under the age of 18 living in them. Of all households, 23.4% were married-couple households, 23.5% were households with a male householder and no spouse or partner present, and 46.2% were households with a female householder and no spouse or partner present. About 36.3% of all households were made up of individuals and 11.6% had someone living alone who was 65 years of age or older.

There were 30,357 housing units, of which 9.7% were vacant. The homeowner vacancy rate was 5.4% and the rental vacancy rate was 6.1%.

Racial composition as of the 2020 census
Race	Number	Percent
White	2,054	3.0%
Black or African American	55,873	80.3%
American Indian and Alaska Native	355	0.5%
Asian	517	0.7%
Native Hawaiian and Other Pacific Islander	15	0.0%
Some other race	5,315	7.6%
Two or more races	5,483	7.9%
Hispanic or Latino (of any race)	9,032	13.0%

=== 2010 census ===
The 2010 United States census counted 64,270 people, 24,945 households, and 14,742 families in the city. The population density was 16,377.1 per square mile (6,323.2/km^{2}). There were 28,803 housing units at an average density of 7,339.5 per square mile (2,833.8/km^{2}). The racial makeup was 4.13% (2,657) White, 88.51% (56,887) Black or African American, 0.39% (248) Native American, 0.72% (465) Asian, 0.06% (38) Pacific Islander, 3.69% (2,370) from other races, and 2.50% (1,605) from two or more races. Hispanic or Latino people of any race were 7.93% (5,095) of the population.

Of the 24,945 households, 29.0% had children under the age of 18; 23.3% were married couples living together; 29.0% had a female householder with no husband present and 40.9% were non-families. Of all households, 35.8% were made up of individuals and 11.1% had someone living alone who was 65 years of age or older. The average household size was 2.53 and the average family size was 3.33.

25.7% of the population were under the age of 18, 10.2% from 18 to 24, 27.8% from 25 to 44, 24.6% from 45 to 64, and 11.8% who were 65 years of age or older. The median age was 35.0 years. For every 100 females, the population had 81.2 males. For every 100 females ages 18 and older there were 75.4 males.

The Census Bureau's 2006–2010 American Community Survey showed that (in 2010 inflation-adjusted dollars) median household income was $40,358 (with a margin of error of ± $1,873) and the median family income was $50,995 (± $2,877). Males had a median income of $38,642 (± $1,851) versus $39,843 (± $2,187) for females. The per capita income for the city was $20,298 (± $746). About 17.8% of families and 21.4% of the population were below the poverty line, including 32.5% of those under age 18 and 16.4% of those age 65 or over.

=== 2000 census ===
As of the 2000 United States census there were 69,824 people, 26,024 households, and 16,082 families residing in the city. The population density was 17,776.6 inhabitants per square mile (6,863.6/km^{2}). There were 28,485 housing units at an average density of 7,252.0 per square mile (2,800.0/km^{2}). The racial makeup of the city was 89.46% Black or African American, 3.84% White, 0.25% Native American, 0.43% Asian, 0.07% Pacific Islander, 2.14% from other races, and 3.80% from two or more races. Hispanic or Latino people of any race were 4.70% of the population.

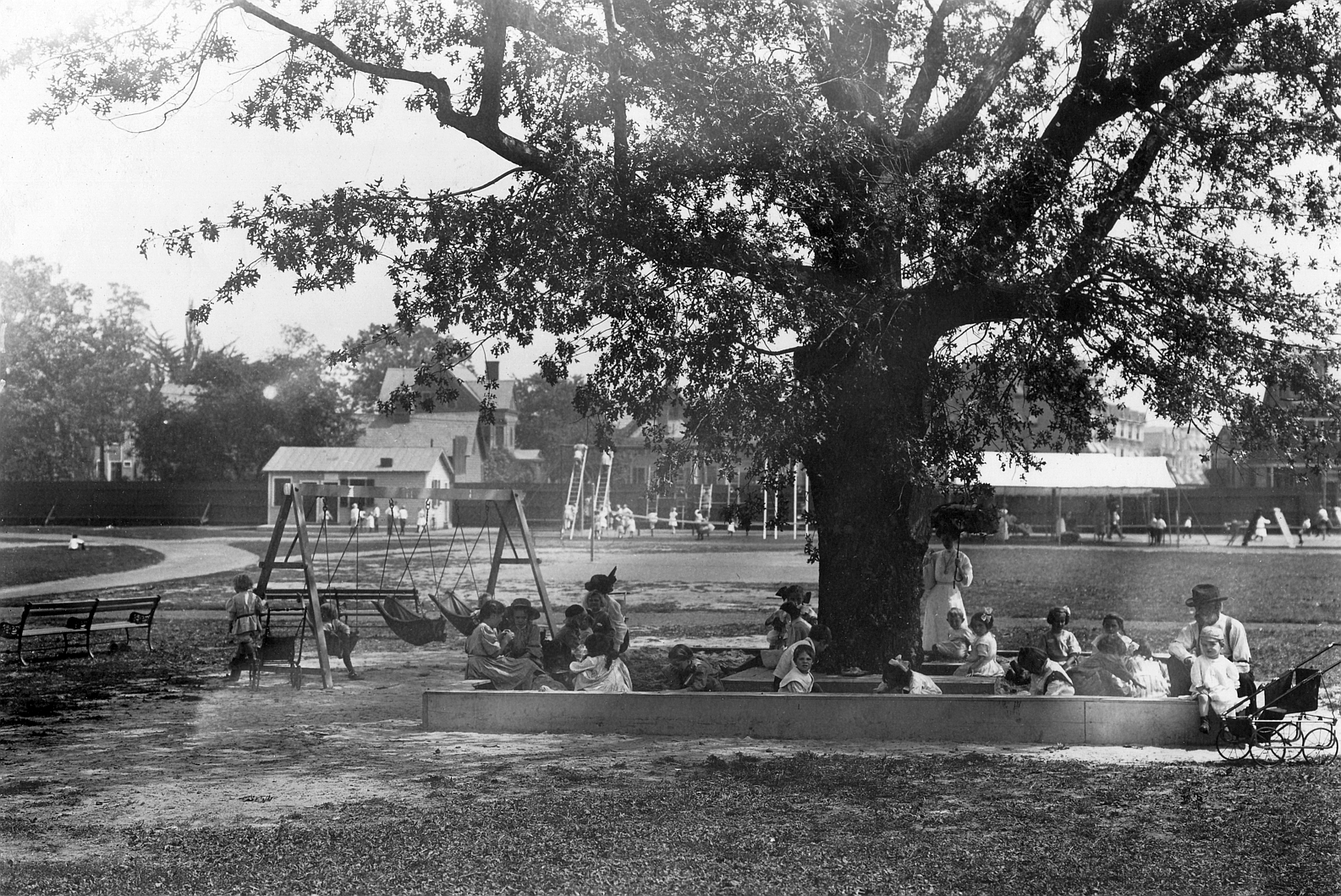
Public playgrounds in East Orange, 1908

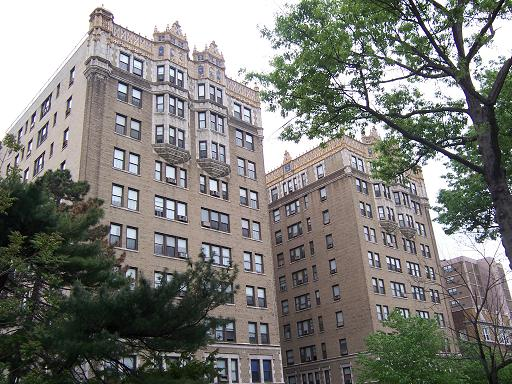
A circa Gilded Age apartment on South Munn Avenue in East Orange

There were 26,024 households, out of which 31.9% had children under the age of 18 living with them, 26.0% were married couples living together, 28.8% had a female householder with no husband present, and 38.2% were non-families. 33.0% of all households were made up of individuals, and 11.0% had someone living alone who was 65 years of age or older. The average household size was 2.63 and the average family size was 3.37.

In the city the population was spread out, with 28.1% under the age of 18, 9.8% from 18 to 24, 30.1% from 25 to 44, 20.8% from 45 to 64, and 11.2% who were 65 years of age or older. The median age was 33 years. For every 100 females, there were 81.9 males. For every 100 females age 18 and over, there were 74.7 males.

The median income for a household in the city was $32,346, and the median income for a family was $38,562. Males had a median income of $31,905 versus $30,268 for females. The per capita income for the city was $16,488. About 15.9% of families and 19.2% of the population were below the poverty line, including 24.7% of those under age 18 and 14.0% of those ages 65 or over.

As part of the 2000 Census, 89.46% of East Orange's residents identified themselves as being Black or African American. This was one of the highest percentages of African American and Caribbean American people in the United States. Migrants from Jamaica, Trinidad and Tobago, Guyana, Haiti and other smaller Caribbean Islands have a huge presence, and East Orange has the second-highest in New Jersey (behind Lawnside, at 93.6%) of all places with 1,000 or more residents identifying Black American ancestry. East Orange also has a large Haitian American community, with 2,852 persons claiming Haitian ancestry in the 2000 Census.

Although still a small percentage of total residents, Orange and East Orange have the largest concentrations of Guyanese Americans in the country. In the 2000 Census, 2.5% of East Orange residents identified as being of Guyanese ancestry. While Queens and Brooklyn had larger populations in terms of raw numbers, Orange (with 2.9%) and East Orange had the highest percentage of people of Guyanese ancestry of all places in the United States with at least 1,000 people identifying their ancestry.

== Economy ==
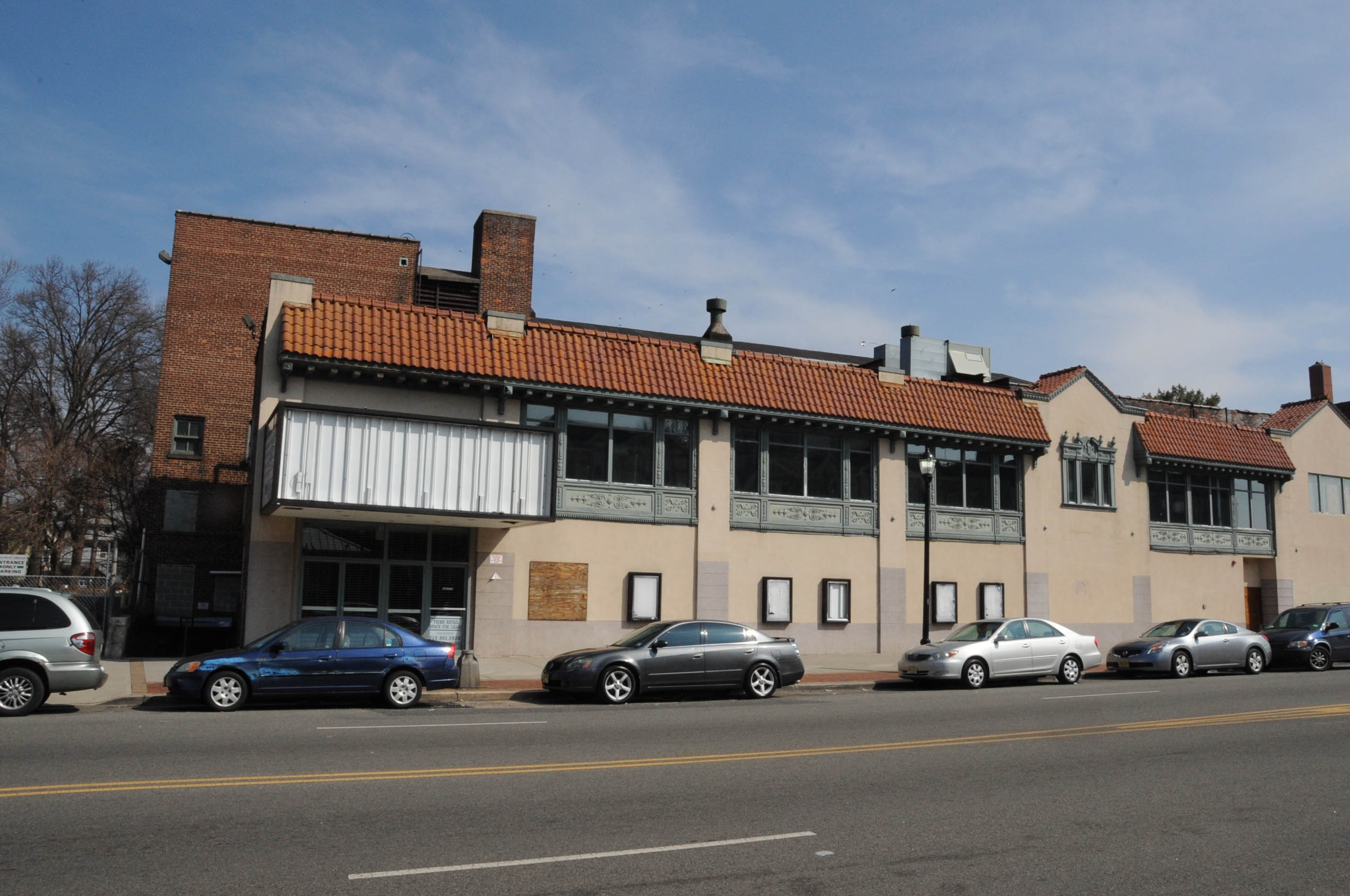
Central Avenue Commercial Historic District

Portions of the city are part of an Urban Enterprise Zone (UEZ), one of 32 zones covering 37 municipalities statewide. East Orange was selected in 1996 as one of a group of seven zones added to participate in the program. In addition to other benefits to encourage employment and investment within the UEZ, shoppers can take advantage of a reduced 3.3125% sales tax rate (half of the 6 5/8% rate charged statewide) at eligible merchants. Established in June 1996, the city's Urban Enterprise Zone status expires in June 2027.

The main commercial avenues of the city are Central Avenue and Main Street, both of which flow east to west, the latter of which was disturbed by the construction of Interstate 280. Recent efforts have been made to revitalize the commercial area, especially along Main Street and Evergreen Place. New apartments buildings & commercial space have been proposed and built over the last decade. Along South Harrison Street, new apartment buildings have gone up, while existing ones have been updated.

== Parks and recreation ==
East Orange is served by five parks: Columbian Park, Elmwood Park, Francis-Haire Park, Memorial Park and Rowley Park. Sports grounds, such as Oval Playground and Soverel Field, the city's largest, offer athletic fields and facilities. Paul Robeson Stadium, located on North Clinton Street, hosts local sports teams and typically, the city's annual Fourth of July fireworks celebration.

The city owns East Orange Golf Course, located 10 miles (16 km) away in Short Hills.

== Government ==
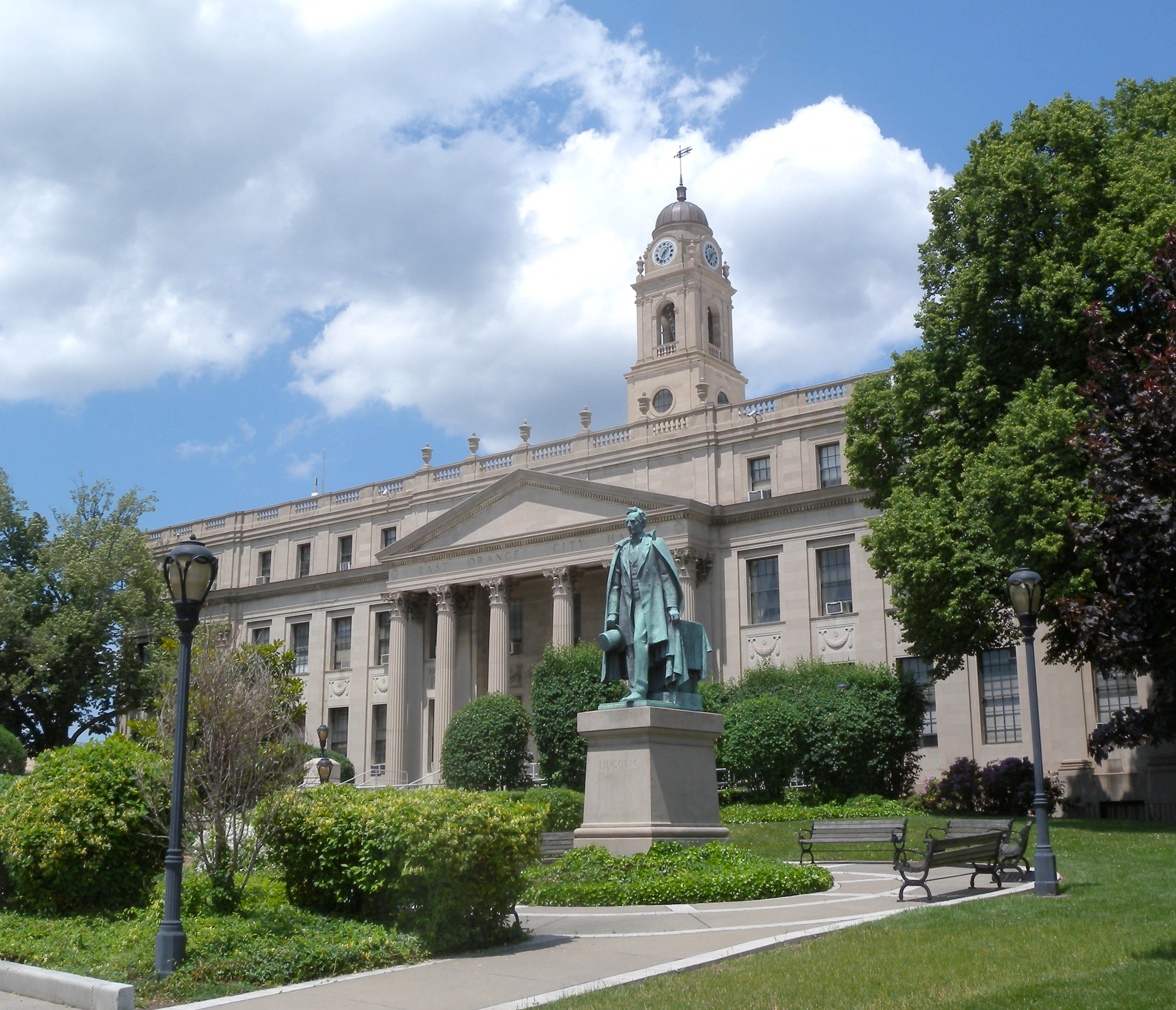
City Hall

East Orange is governed under the city form of New Jersey municipal government. The city is one of 15 municipalities (of the 564) statewide that use this traditional form of government. The government is comprised of a mayor and a city council made up of ten members, two representing each of the city's five geographic political subdivisions called wards. The mayor is elected directly by the voters. The ten members of the city council are elected to four-year terms on a staggered basis, with one seat in each ward coming up for election in odd-numbered years.

The City Council performs the legislative functions of municipal government by enacting ordinances, resolutions or motions, and is responsible for review and adoption of the municipal budget that has been submitted by the mayor.

As of 2026, the Mayor of East Orange is Democrat Theodore R. "Ted" Green, whose term of office ends December 31, 2029. Members of the City Council are Christopher Awe (D, 2029; 2nd Ward), Naimma Fauntleroy (D, 2027; 5th Ward), Tameika Garrett-Ward (D, 2029; 4th Ward), Casim L. Gomez (D, 2023; 4th Ward), Alicia Holman (D, 2029; 5th Ward), Christopher D. James (D, 2029; 1st Ward), Bergson Leneus (D, 2029; 3rd Ward), Amy Lewis (D, 2027; 1st Ward), Sammed Monk (D, 2027; 2nd Ward) and Vernon Pullins Jr. (D, 2027; 3rd Ward).

In July 2018, the City Council selected Christopher Awe to fill the Second Ward seat expiring in December 2021 that became vacant when Romal D. Bullock resigned to become the city's tax assessor. In November 2018, Awe was elected to serve the balance of the term of office.

In December 2018, Tameika Garrett-Ward was appointed to fill the Fourth Ward seat expiring in December 2021 that became vacant when Tyshammie L. Cooper was sworn into office on the Essex County Board of Chosen Freeholders; she was elected to serve the balance of the term in November 2019.

The first African-American mayor of East Orange was William S. Hart Sr., who was elected to two consecutive terms, serving in office from 1970 to 1978. Hart Middle School was named after him.

=== Federal, state and county representation ===
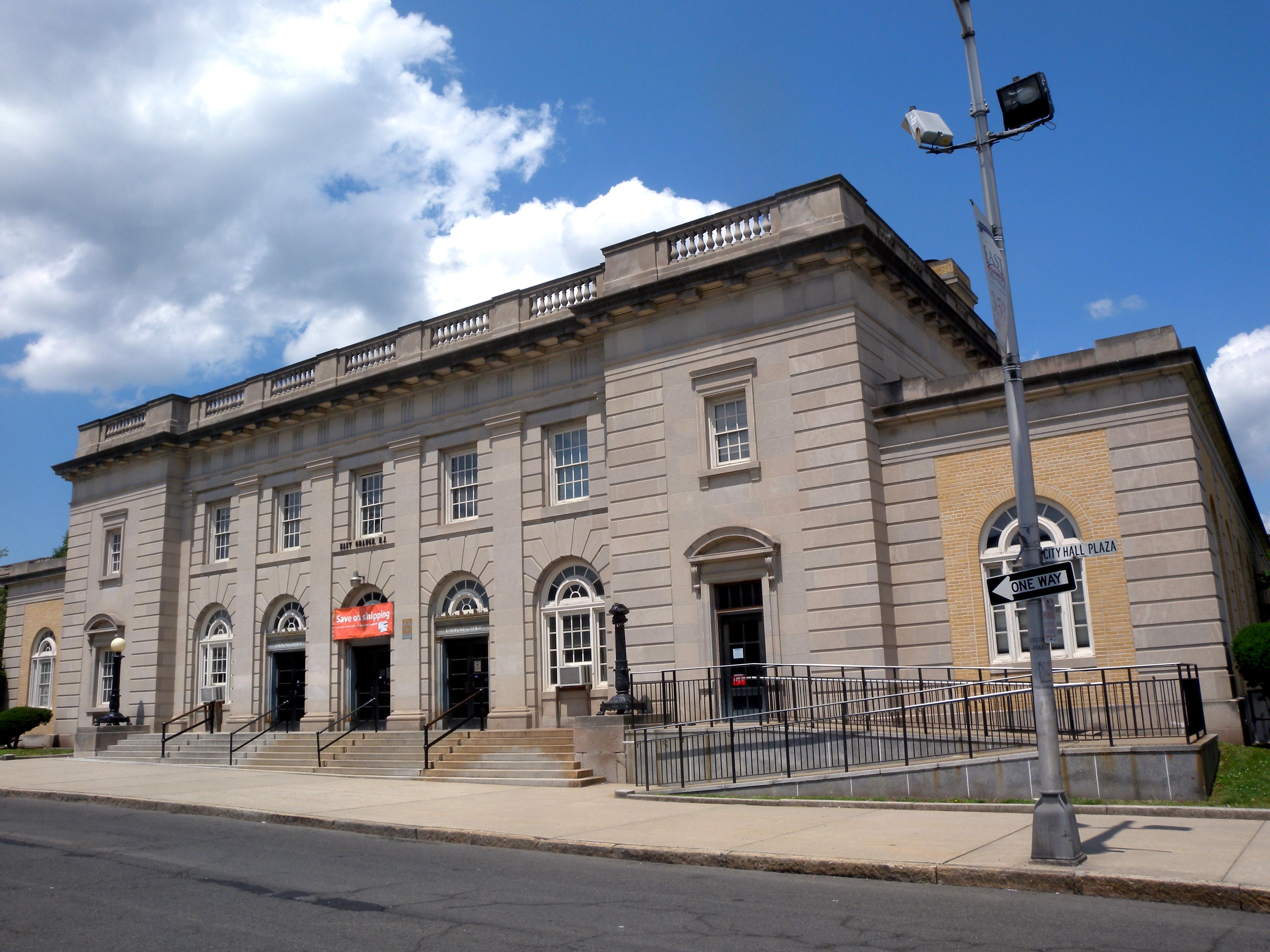
Post office

East Orange is located in the 10th Congressional District and is part of New Jersey's 34th state legislative district.

For the 119th United States Congress, New Jersey's 10th congressional district is represented by LaMonica McIver (D, Newark). New Jersey is represented in the United States Senate by Democrats Cory Booker (Newark, term ends 2027) and Andy Kim (Moorestown, term ends 2031).

For the 2026–2027 session, the 34th legislative district of the New Jersey Legislature is represented in the State Senate by Britnee Timberlake (D, East Orange) and in the General Assembly by Carmen Morales (D, Belleville) and Michael Venezia (D, Bloomfield).

Essex County is governed by a directly elected county executive, with legislative functions performed by the Board of County Commissioners. As of 2025, the County Executive is Joseph N. DiVincenzo Jr. (D, Roseland), whose four-year term of office ends December 31, 2026. The county's Board of County Commissioners is composed of nine members, five of whom are elected from districts and four of whom are elected on an at-large basis. They are elected for three-year concurrent terms and may be re-elected to successive terms at the annual election in November. Essex County's Commissioners are:

Robert Mercado (D, District 1 – Newark's North and East Wards, parts of Central and West Wards; Newark, 2026), A'Dorian Murray-Thomas (D, District 2 – Irvington, Maplewood and parts of Newark's South and West Wards; Newark, 2026), Vice President Tyshammie L. Cooper (D, District 3 - Newark: West and Central Wards; East Orange, Orange and South Orange; East Orange, 2026), Leonard M. Luciano (D, District 4 – Caldwell, Cedar Grove, Essex Fells, Fairfield, Livingston, Millburn, North Caldwell, Roseland, Verona, West Caldwell and West Orange; West Caldwell, 2026), President Carlos M. Pomares (D, District 5 – Belleville, Bloomfield, Glen Ridge, Montclair and Nutley; Bloomfield, 2026), Brendan W. Gill (D, at large; Montclair, 2026), Romaine Graham (D, at large; Irvington, 2026), Wayne Richardson (D, at large; Newark, 2026), Patricia Sebold (D, at-large; Livingston, 2026).

Constitutional officers elected countywide are: Clerk Christopher J. Durkin (D, West Caldwell, 2025), Register of Deeds Juan M. Rivera Jr. (D, Newark, 2029), Sheriff Amir Jones (D, Newark, 2027), and Surrogate Alturrick Kenney (D, Newark, 2028).

=== Politics ===
As of March 2011, there were a total of 36,280 registered voters in East Orange, of which 21,646 (59.7%) were registered as Democrats, 396 (1.1%) were registered as Republicans and 14,228 (39.2%) were registered as Unaffiliated. There were 10 voters registered to other parties.

United States presidential election results for East Orange
Year	Republican		Democratic		Third party(ies)	
Year	No.	%	No.	%	No.	%
2024	1,916	8.66%	20,122	90.92%	94	0.42%
2020	1,127	4.44%	24,199	95.24%	83	0.33%
2016	594	2.55%	22,542	96.69%	178	0.76%
2012	330	1.31%	24,862	98.49%	50	0.20%
2008	408	1.62%	24,718	98.14%	60	0.24%
2004	1,225	5.91%	19,447	93.79%	62	0.30%

In the 2012 presidential election, Democrat Barack Obama received 98.5% of the vote (24,862 cast), ahead of Republican Mitt Romney with 1.3% (330 votes), and other candidates with 0.2% (46 votes), among the 25,375 ballots cast by the city's 39,668 registered voters (137 ballots were spoiled), for a turnout of 64.0%. In the 2008 presidential election, Democrat Barack Obama received 97.7% of the vote (24,718 cast), ahead of Republican John McCain with 1.6% (408 votes) and other candidates with 0.1% (35 votes), among the 25,304 ballots cast by the city's 36,891 registered voters, for a turnout of 68.6%. In the 2004 presidential election, Democrat John Kerry received 93.2% of the vote (19,447 ballots cast), outpolling Republican George W. Bush with 5.9% (1,225 votes) and other candidates with 0.4% (128 votes), among the 20,856 ballots cast by the city's 33,328 registered voters, for a turnout percentage of 62.6.

Gubernatorial election results for East Orange
Year	Republican		Democratic		Third party(ies)	
Year	No.	%	No.	%	No.	%
2025	704	4.20%	15,987	95.35%	75	0.45%
2021	407	3.54%	11,036	96.03%	49	0.43%
2017	211	1.91%	10,598	95.68%	267	2.41%
2013	1,212	11.33%	9,413	87.97%	75	0.70%
2009	380	2.89%	12,554	95.47%	216	1.64%
2005	518	4.01%	12,250	94.90%	141	1.09%

In the 2013 gubernatorial election, Democrat Barbara Buono received 88.0% of the vote (9,413 cast), ahead of Republican Chris Christie with 11.3% (1,212 votes), and other candidates with 0.7% (75 votes), among the 11,269 ballots cast by the city's 41,016 registered voters (569 ballots were spoiled), for a turnout of 27.5%. In the 2009 gubernatorial election, Democrat Jon Corzine received 94.4% of the vote (12,554 ballots cast), ahead of Republican Chris Christie with 2.9% (380 votes), Independent Chris Daggett with 1.2% (153 votes) and other candidates with 0.5% (63 votes), among the 13,295 ballots cast by the city's 36,157 registered voters, yielding a 36.8% turnout.

United States Senate election results for East Orange1
Year	Republican		Democratic		Third party(ies)	
Year	No.	%	No.	%	No.	%
2024	1,619	7.54%	19,279	89.77%	577	2.69%
2018	481	2.80%	16,430	95.48%	297	1.73%
2012	283	1.25%	22,135	98.12%	141	0.63%
2006	468	4.15%	10,650	94.42%	161	1.43%

United States Senate election results for East Orange2
Year	Republican		Democratic		Third party(ies)	
Year	No.	%	No.	%	No.	%
2020	796	3.20%	23,823	95.64%	289	1.16%
2014	180	1.68%	10,432	97.39%	100	0.93%
2013	181	1.90%	9,264	97.41%	65	0.68%
2008	410	1.95%	20,346	96.94%	233	1.11%

== Education ==
The East Orange School District serves students in pre-kindergarten through twelfth grade. The district is one of 31 former Abbott districts statewide that were established pursuant to the decision by the New Jersey Supreme Court in Abbott v. Burke which are now referred to as "SDA Districts" based on the requirement for the state to cover all costs for school building and renovation projects in these districts under the supervision of the New Jersey Schools Development Authority.

As of the 2023–24 school year, the district, comprised of 20 schools, had an enrollment of 9,337 students and 633.0 classroom teachers (on an FTE basis), for a student–teacher ratio of 14.8:1. Schools in the district (with 2023–24 enrollment data from the National Center for Education Statistics) are Althea Gibson Early Childhood Academy (131 students; in grades PreK and K), Wahlstrom Academy (159; PreK–K), Benjamin Banneker Academy (487; PreK–8), Edward T. Bowser School of Excellence (528; PreK–5), Mildred Barry Garvin School (236; PreK and 3–5), Whitney E. Houston Academy of Creative and Performing Arts (327; PreK–8), Langston Hughes Elementary School (568; PreK–5), Garfield Jackson Academy (238; PreK–5), Touissant Louverture School (262; PreK–5), Sheila Y. Oliver Academy (438; PreK–8), Gordon Parks Academy (295; PreK–2), Cicely L. Tyson Community Elementary School of the Performing and Fine Arts (488; PreK–5), Dionne Warwick Institute (412; PreK–5), Sojourner Truth Middle School (262; 6), Patrick F. Healy Middle School (329; 7–8), John L. Costley Middle School (320; 7–8), Cicely Tyson School of Performing and Fine Arts (695; 6–12), East Orange Campus High School located on the former campus of Upsala College (1,751; 9–12), East Orange STEM Academy (609; 6–12) and Fresh Start Academy (NA; 6–12).

East Orange Community Charter School is a public charter school that operates independently of the school district under a charter granted by the New Jersey Department of Education.

Ahlus Sunnah School is a K–12 madrasah that has been in East Orange since 2005.

The East Orange Public Library at one time included three branch buildings of the original 36 Carnegie-funded libraries in New Jersey; the original building opened in 1903 with costs covered by a gift of $50,000 (equivalent to $1.8 million in 2025) from Andrew Carnegie. It has a collection of 344,000 volumes and circulates about 319,000 items annually from four locations.

== Healthcare ==
East Orange is served by East Orange General Hospital, located on Central Avenue in the southern part of the city. The 211 bed hospital is the only independent, fully accredited, acute care hospital in Essex County. The hospital was recently acquired by Prospect Medical Systems and renamed to CareWell Health Medical Center in 2022. East Orange is also home to the US Department of Veterans Affairs Medical Center, also known as the East Orange VA Hospital. It is located on Tremont Avenue near S.Orange Ave. and serves many vets from the region.

== Transportation ==
=== Roads and highways ===
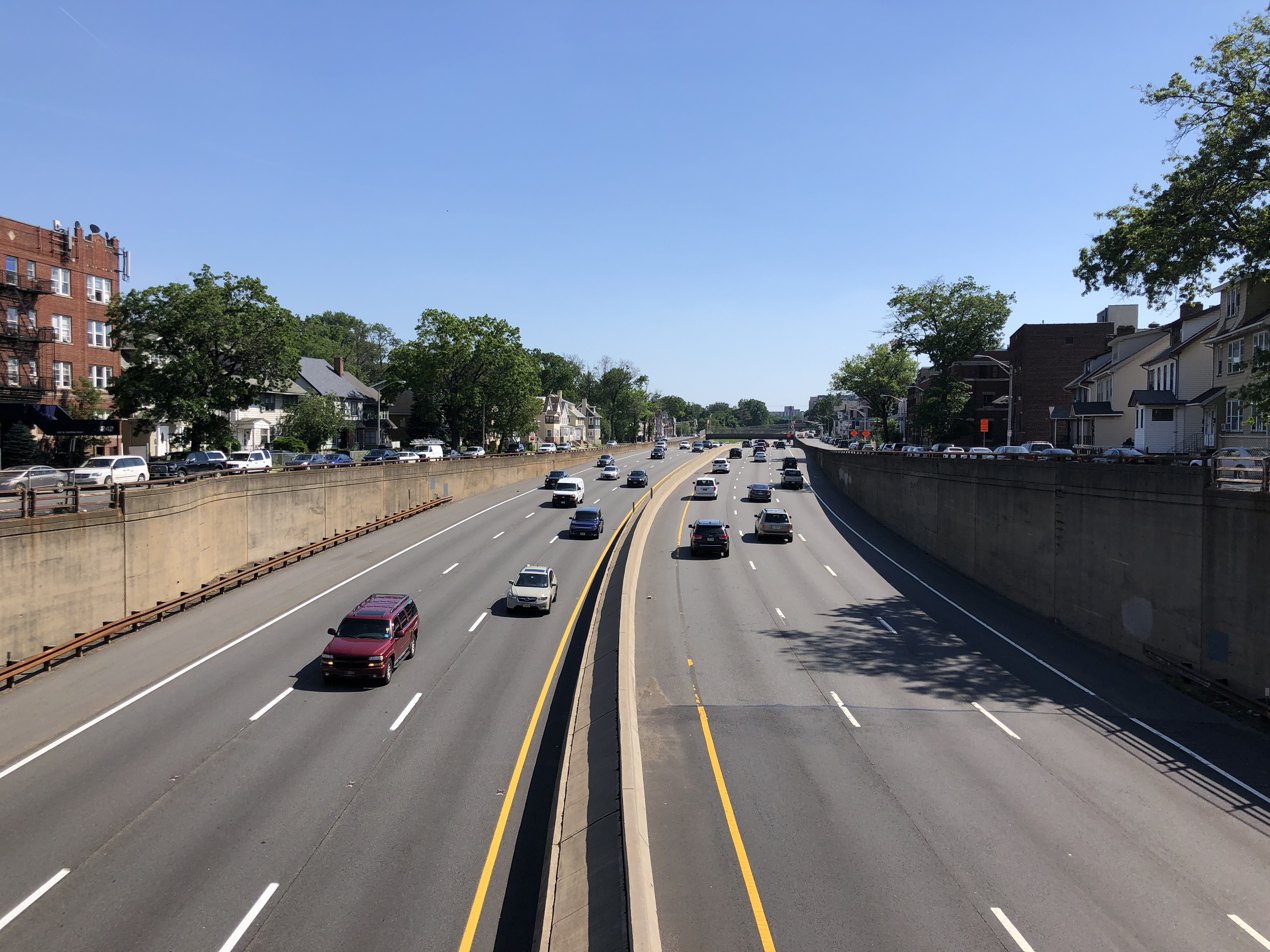
The Garden State Parkway in East Orange

As of May 2010, the city had a total of 83.43 miles (134.27 km) of roadways, of which 73.27 miles (117.92 km) were maintained by the municipality, 6.30 miles (10.14 km) by Essex County, 1.52 miles (2.45 km) by the New Jersey Department of Transportation and 2.34 miles (3.77 km) by the New Jersey Turnpike Authority.

The Garden State Parkway is the most prominent highway passing through the city, connecting Newark in the south to Bloomfield in the north. The Parkway is accessible at Interchange 145 for Interstate 280 and at Interchange 147 for Springdale Avenue. Interstate 280 is the other major highway crossing the city, following a west-to-east route from Orange to Newark.

Major county highways serving the city include County Route 508 and County Route 510. These both traverse the city west-to-east, following Central Avenue and South Orange Avenue, respectively. County Route 509 also crosses East Orange, following a south-to-north alignment through the city via Grove Street.

=== Public transportation ===
Local transportation around the city and into neighboring communities is provided by multiple NJ Transit public bus lines, which includes routes 5, 21, 24, 34, 41, 44, 71, 73, 79, 90, 92, 94, and 97.

New Jersey Transit operates two commuter rail train stations in East Orange, both located along the Morris & Essex Lines, both offering seven-day service to New York Penn Station in Midtown Manhattan as well as weekday service to Hoboken Terminal. The East Orange station is located beside the westbound lanes of Interstate 280, directly across its parking lot from East Orange City Hall. Just one mile west up Main Street is Brick Church station, the city's second rail stop and the more heavily used of the two.

The Montclair-Boonton Line runs through the Ampere neighborhood of the city on the east, after splitting off from the Morris & Essex Lines just east of the city line in Newark. Ampere station was a former stop on the line near Ampere Parkway and Springdale Avenue which opened in 1890, but closed in 1991 due to low ridership. Residents can use nearby Watsessing Avenue station in neighboring Bloomfield. Another former stop was Grove Street station, a mile east of Brick Church, which ended service in April 1991, together with the Ampere station.

The city is 7.8 miles (12.6 km) from Newark Liberty International Airport in the nearby cities of Newark and Elizabeth.
