= Grove Street station (Newark Light Rail) =

Newark Light Rail station

Grove Street
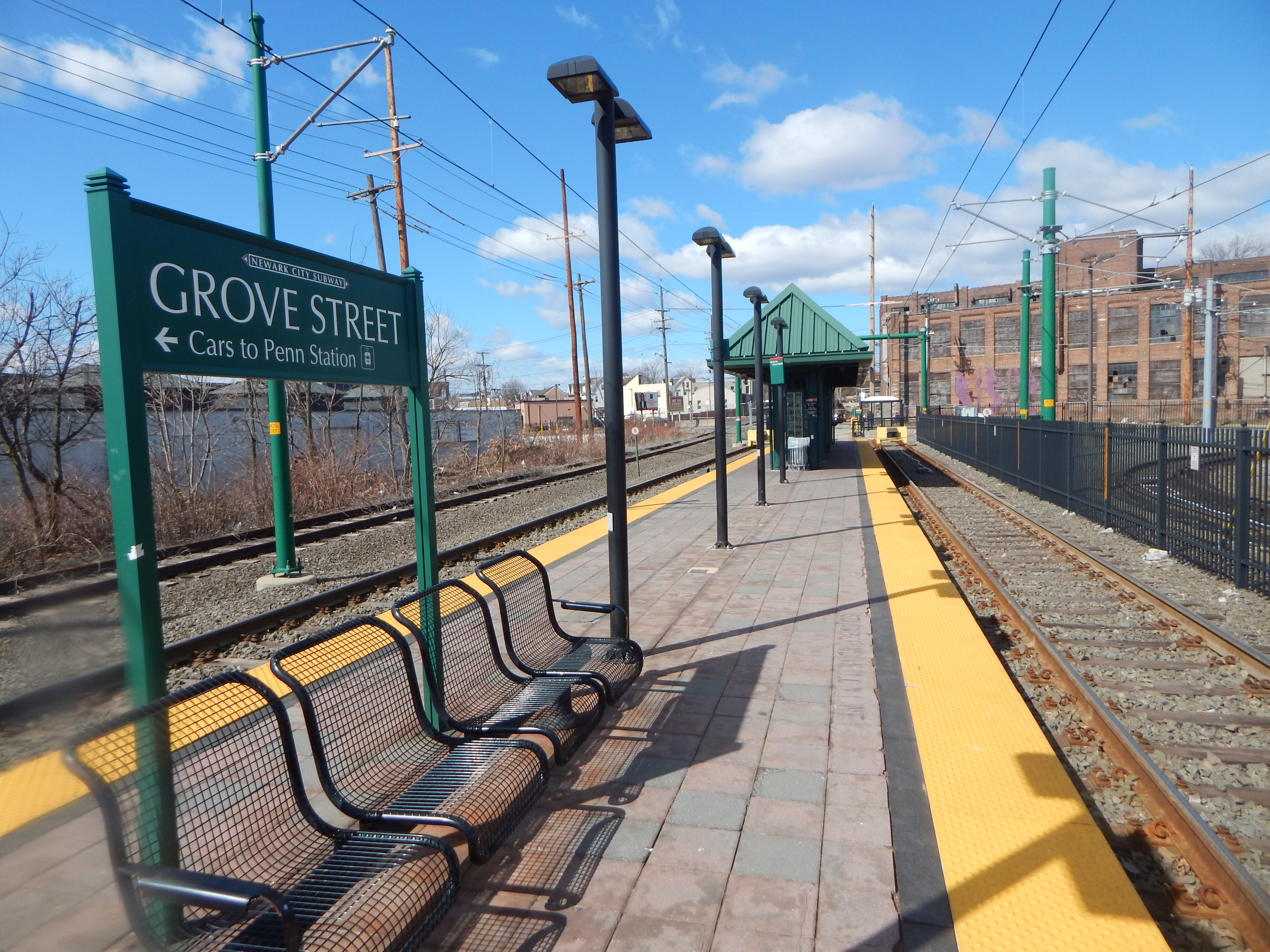
- Grove Street station in April 2015

General information
- Location: 224 Grove Street; Bloomfield, New Jersey
- Coordinates: 40°46′49″N 74°11′16″W
- Owner: New Jersey Transit
- Platforms: 1 island platform
- Tracks: 2
- Connections: NJ Transit Bus: 11, 28, go28, 29, 72, 90

Construction
- Parking: 160 spaces, 6 accessible spaces
- Cycle facilities: Yes
- Accessible: Yes

Other information
- Station code: 30539

History
- Opened: June 22, 2002

Passengers
- 2025: 677 (average weekday)

Services
Preceding station	NJ Transit	Following station
Terminus	Grove Street – Newark Penn	Silver Lake toward Newark Penn
Former services
Preceding station	Erie Railroad	Following station
Prospect Street–East Orange toward West Orange	Orange Branch Bloomfield Avenue	Silver Lake toward Forest Hill
Location

Grove Street station is a surface-level light rail stop in the Silver Lake section of Bloomfield, New Jersey. The station is the western terminus of the Newark City Subway section of the New Jersey Transit Newark Light Rail that heads to Penn Station in Newark.

The vehicle maintenance facility is east of the station. Grove Street is a single island platform station with two tracks and is accessible for handicapped people as part of the Americans with Disabilities Act of 1990. A 160-space park and ride lot is located one block from the station, after the loop track for the maintenance facility. Grove Street is also near the Watsessing Avenue station of New Jersey Transit's Montclair-Boonton Line.

Grove Street station opened on June 22, 2002, part of an extension from Branch Brook Park station in Newark to Bloomfield, with a middle stop at Silver Lake in Belleville. The tracks follow the right-of-way of the former Erie Railroad Orange Branch, which went from the Forest Hill section of Newark to West Orange. The former Bloomfield Avenue station was located one block west of the current Grove Street station. Service on that branch ended on May 20, 1955.
