= Tony Zuzzio =

American football player (1916–2002)

- Zuzzio from The 1939 Ciarella

Profile
- Positions: Tackle, Guard

Personal information
- Born: August 5, 1916; Irvington, New Jersey, U.S.
- Died: April 7, 2002 (aged 85); Lawrence, Kansas, U.S.

Career information
- College: Muhlenberg

Career history
- 1942: Detroit Lions

Anthony Joseph Zuzzio (August 5, 1916 – April 7, 2002) was a professional football player for the Detroit Lions during the 1942 NFL season. He also played college football for Muhlenberg College in 1938 and 1939.

== Early life ==
Zuzzio was born in 1916 in Irvington, New Jersey. His father, Charles Zuzzio, worked as a nickel polisher. He attended Belleville High School in Belleville, New Jersey.

== Football player ==
Zuzzio attended Muhlenberg College in Allentown, Pennsylvania. He played college football at Muhlenberg under head coach Doggie Julian as a tackle during the 1938 and 1939 seasons.

In 1942, Zuzzio played professional football as a lineman for the Detroit Lions. He appeared in two games for the Lions during the 1942 season, before he was drafted into military service. He was released by the Lions on September 30, 1942,

== Military service and later years ==
Zuzzio enlisted in the United States Army Air Forces on October 7, 1942. He served throughout World War II and was discharged in 1946. He received the American Theater Ribbon (for service in the American Theater of Operations), Good Conduct Medal and a World War II Victory Medal.

After the war, Zuzzio became a high school teacher and coach.

In 1977, Zuzzio was inducted into the Belleville High School Hall of Fame. From 1964 to 1966, he also worked as a scout for the Los Angeles Dodgers baseball team.

In April 2002, Zuzzio died at age 85 in Lawrence, Kansas.
