= Forest Hill, Newark, New Jersey =

Historic district in Essex County, New Jersey, US

- Forest Hill Historic District
- U.S. National Register of Historic Places
- U.S. Historic district
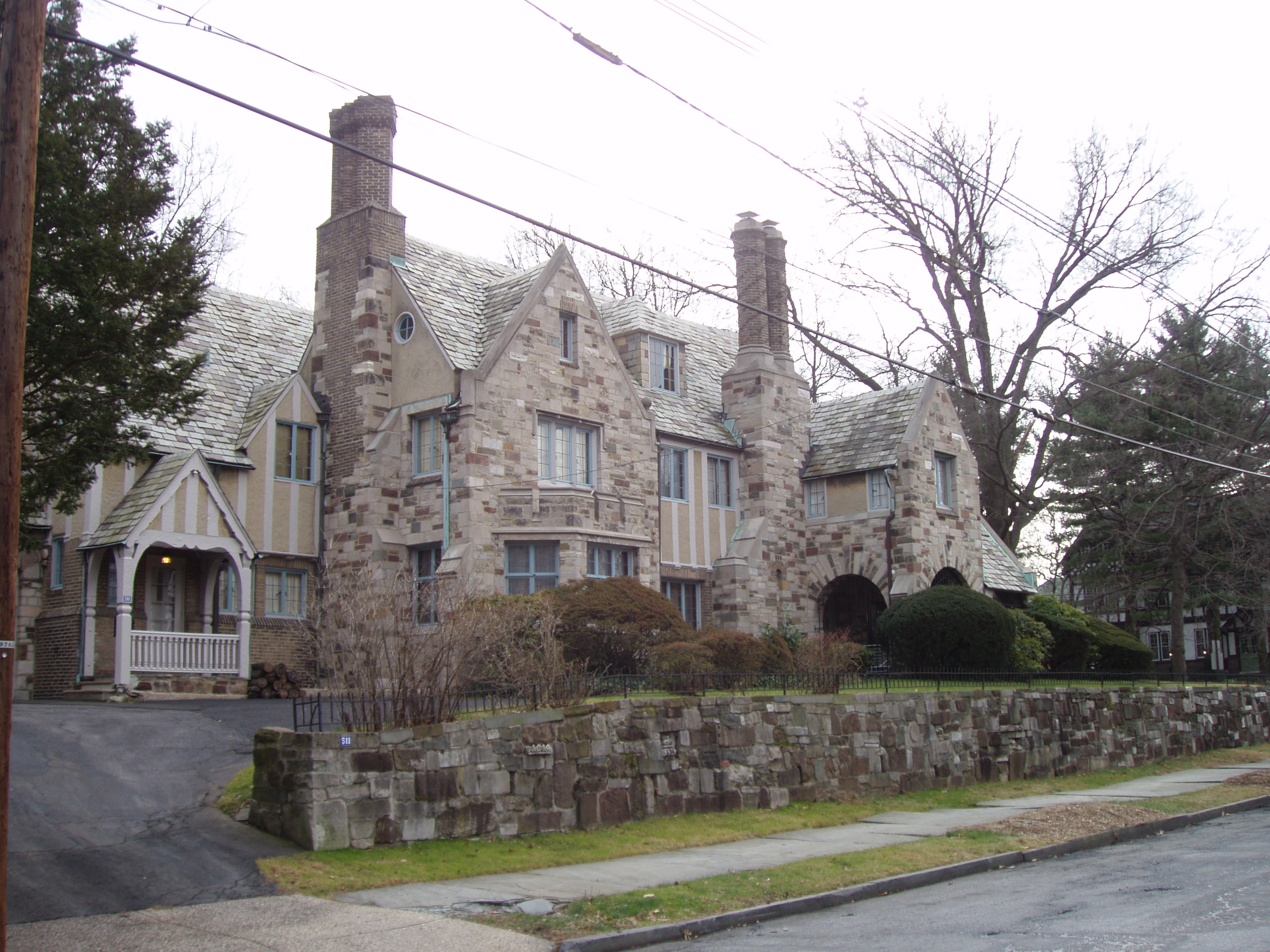
- "The Castle" in Forest Hill

- Location within Essex County, New Jersey
- Location: Roughly bounded by Verona Avenue, Mt. Prospect Avenue, 2nd Avenue and Branch Brook Park, Newark, New Jersey
- Coordinates: 40°46′22″N 74°10′14″W
- Area: 256 acres (104 ha)
- Architect: Multiple
- Architectural style: Colonial Revival, Bungalow/Craftsman, Queen Anne
- NRHP reference No.: 90001193
- Added to NRHP: August 3, 1990

Forest Hill is a neighborhood in the city of Newark in Essex County, in the U.S. state of New Jersey. It is a pre-World War II neighborhood in the North Ward. It is bounded on the west by Branch Brook Park, on the south by Bloomfield Avenue (some maps place the southern limit at 2nd Avenue), and on the east by both Summer and Mt. Prospect Avenues, the neighborhood of Broadway. The neighborhood's ZIP Code is 07104.

Forest Hill is located on a ridge between the Passaic River and the valley of the Branch Brook. It was first developed by Elias Heller, who owned a file factory in North Newark, on the Belleville border. Heller Parkway is named in his honor. From the 1870s to the 1920s, generations of wealthy Newarkers built hundreds of stately homes in the area in various styles, including Beaux-Arts, Victorian, Colonial Revival, Gothic Revival, and Spanish Revival. One such house is the Wright-Clark house, a Tudor style manor built during the early 1900s. Along with their mansions, the wealthy of Forest Hill also developed scores of social and literary clubs. Other than the homes, landmarks include the old Tiffany factory and the Ballantine Gate. The North End branch and the Branch Brook Park branch of the Newark Public Library serve the neighborhood.

The neighborhood is well preserved and maintained, and few of the historic homes have been torn down, renovated into apartments, or transferred to institutional use. The northern part of the neighborhood is part of an official historic district, containing a marker that was erected by The Newark Preservation and Landmarks Committee, a non-profit organization dedicated to the care of Newark's past history. During special times throughout the year, there are special tours made possible by several organizations such as the New Jersey Historical Society where homeowners open their homes to visitors, and the Mount Pleasant Cemetery Association. Working alongside the neighborhood, the Forest Hill Community Association provides assistance by offering a chance to volunteer, and hosting various events of engagement. This area also includes a diverse community, standing out for its calm environment.

The Sydenham House located on "The Old Road to Bloomfield" (east of Branch Brook Park) and built in 1712 is the city's oldest private residence. It was later expanded in the early 19th Century. D.J. and Elizabeth Henderson restored it in the 1950s.

== Transportation ==
The Bloomfield Avenue, Davenport Avenue and Branch Brook Park stations of the Newark Light Rail system are all located nearby.

== Notable people ==
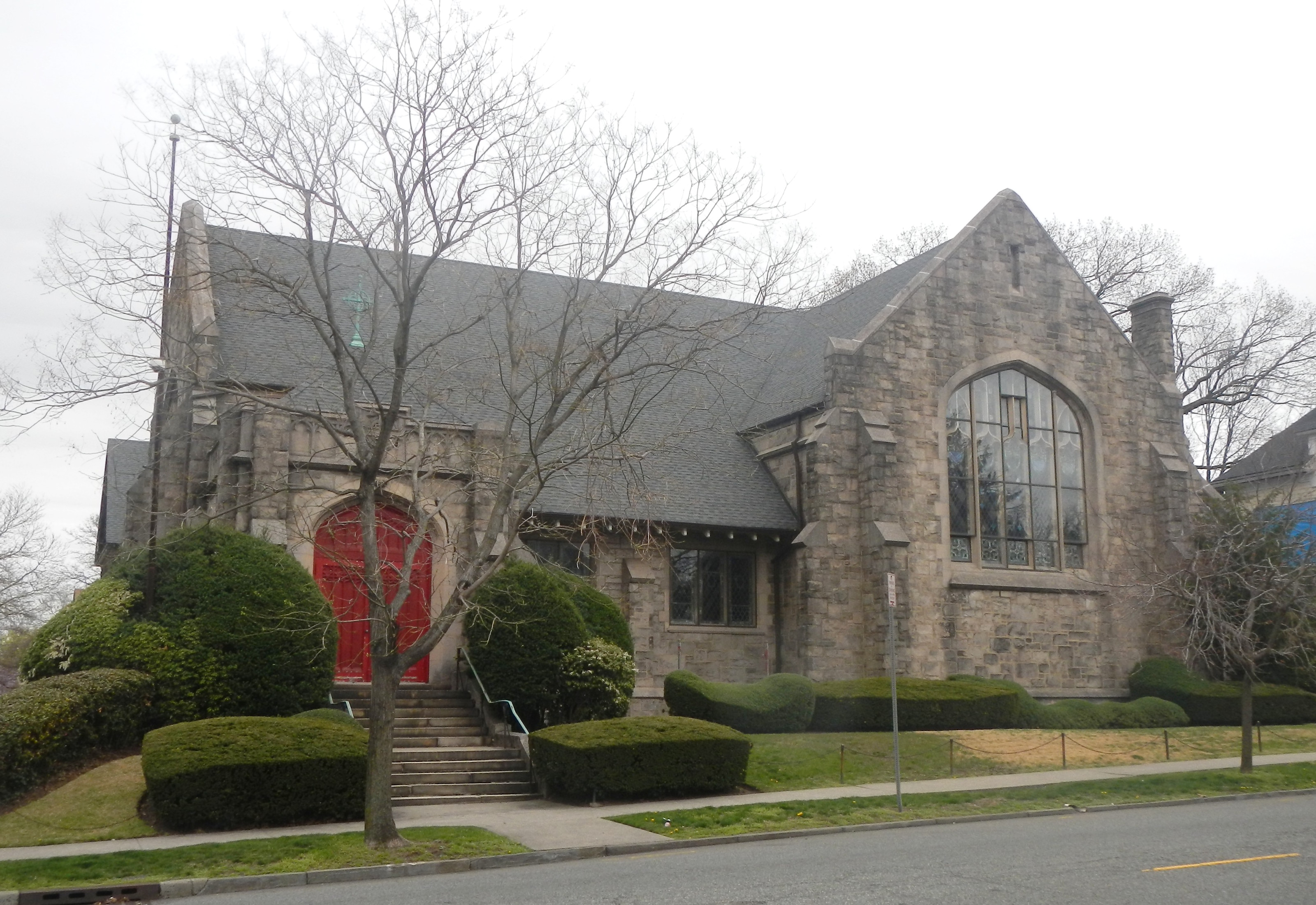
Forest Hill Presbyterian Church

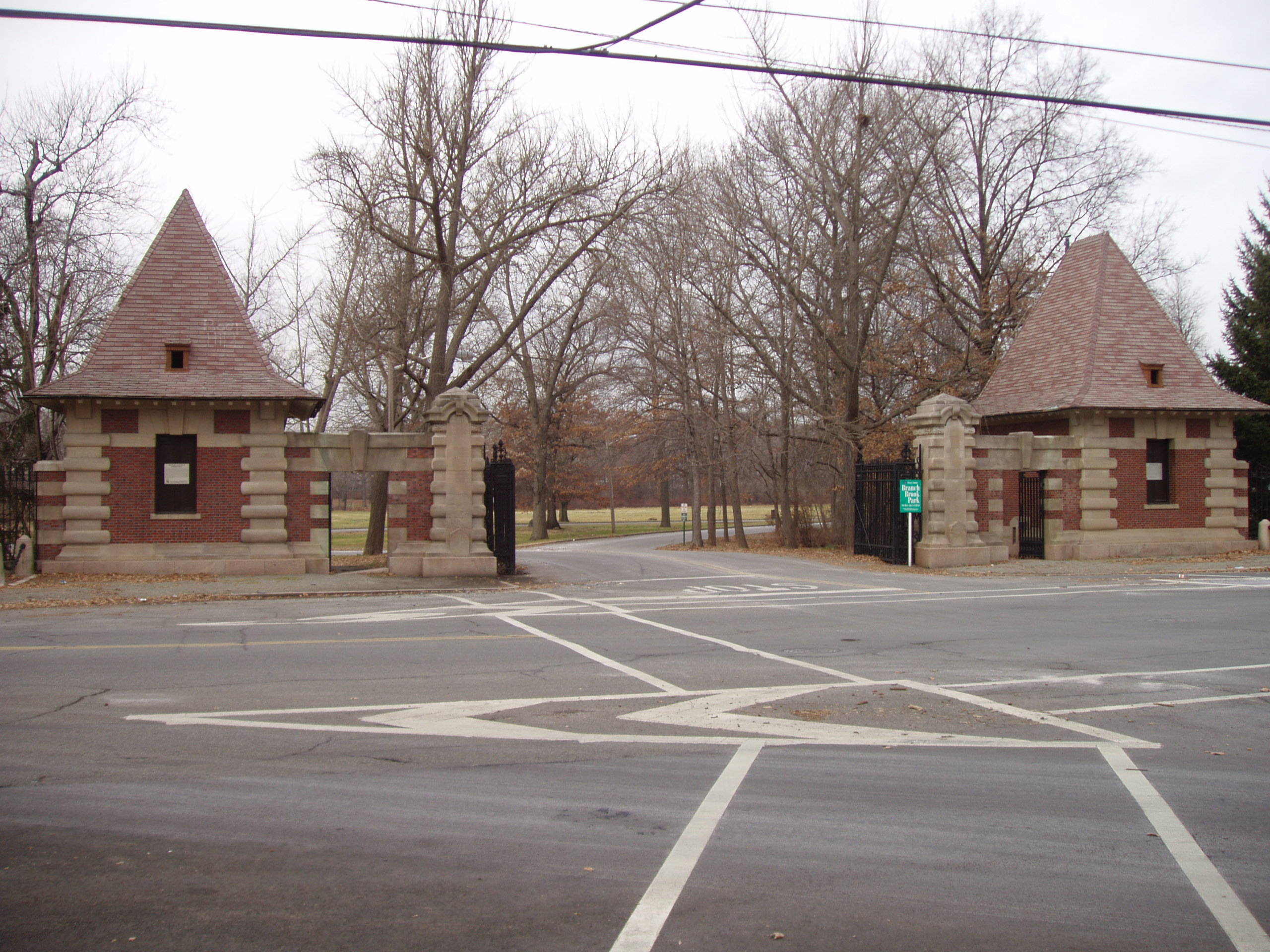
The Ballantine gates, on the east side of Branch Brook Park at Lake Street and Ballantine Parkway were given to Branch Brook Park by Peter Ballantine in 1899. They are modeled on gates in Scotland

Notable current and former residents of Forest Hill include:

- Robert Altenkirch, President of the University of Alabama in Huntsville.
- Peter Ballantine (1791–1883), founder of Newark's Patterson & Ballantine Brewing Company in 1840.
- Dean Faiello (born 1959), non-doctor convicted of killing a patient during a medical procedure.
- Maria Jeritza (1887–1982), opera singer.
- Louis Comfort Tiffany (1848–1933), artist and designer best known for his work in stained glass.
- William Hayes Ward (1835–1916) clergyman, editor of The Independent, a leading Abolitionist newspaper.
