= Branch Brook Park station =

Light rail station in Newark, New Jersey

Branch Brook Park
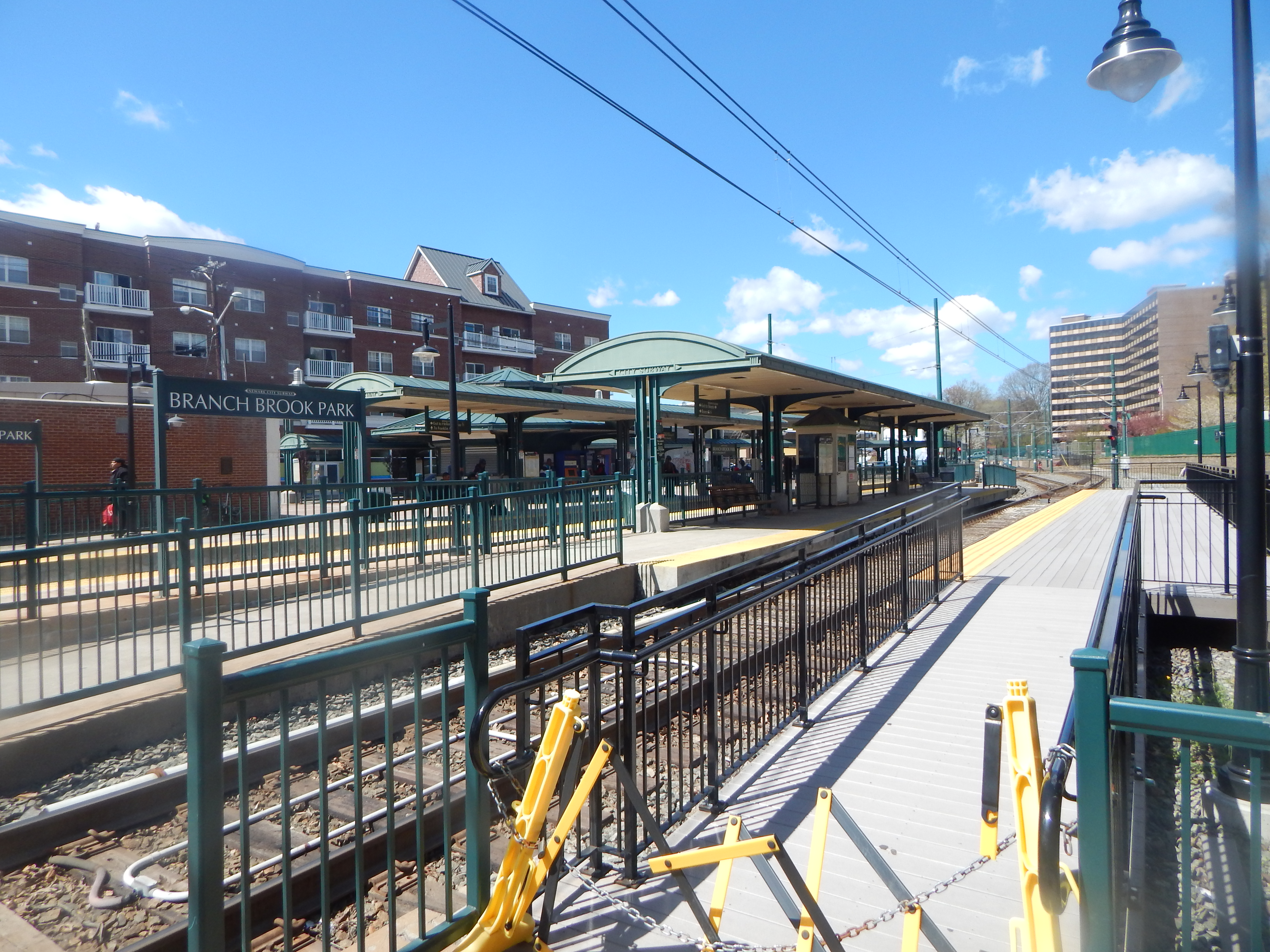
- Branch Brook Park station in April 2015 from the ramp to Heller Parkway

General information
- Location: North 5th Street & Anthony Street; Newark, New Jersey
- Coordinates: 40°46′47″N 74°10′29″W
- Owner: New Jersey Transit
- Platforms: 1 island platform, 1 side platform
- Tracks: 2
- Bus stands: 5
- Connections: NJ Transit Bus: 27, 74, 90, 92, 99

Construction
- Structure type: Below grade
- Parking: 112 spaces
- Cycle facilities: Yes
- Accessible: Yes

Other information
- Station code: 30762

History
- Opened: May 26, 1935
- Rebuilt: 1940, 1953, 2001
- Former names: Franklin Avenue, Heller Parkway

Passengers
- 2025: 1,841 (average weekday)
- Rank: 2 of 17

Services
Preceding station	NJ Transit	Following station
Silver Lake toward Grove Street	Grove Street – Newark Penn	Davenport Avenue toward Newark Penn
Location

Branch Brook Park station is a light rail station in the Forest Hill neighborhood of Newark, New Jersey. The station services trains of the Newark Light Rail, operated by NJ Transit and is the last in the city of Newark heading westbound. The next station to the west is Silver Lake in Belleville. The next station to the south is Davenport Avenue. Branch Brook Park operates as an intermodal transportation hub, with two platforms for the light rail, one side platform and one island platform. There is also a third platform for bus services.

The station is located on the site of the original Newark City Subway streetcar loop and station known as Franklin Avenue. In 2001, NJ Transit replaced the loop, Franklin Avenue station and the nearby Heller Parkway station into one straight facility known as Branch Brook Park, named after the nearby park.

== History ==
=== Heller Parkway ===
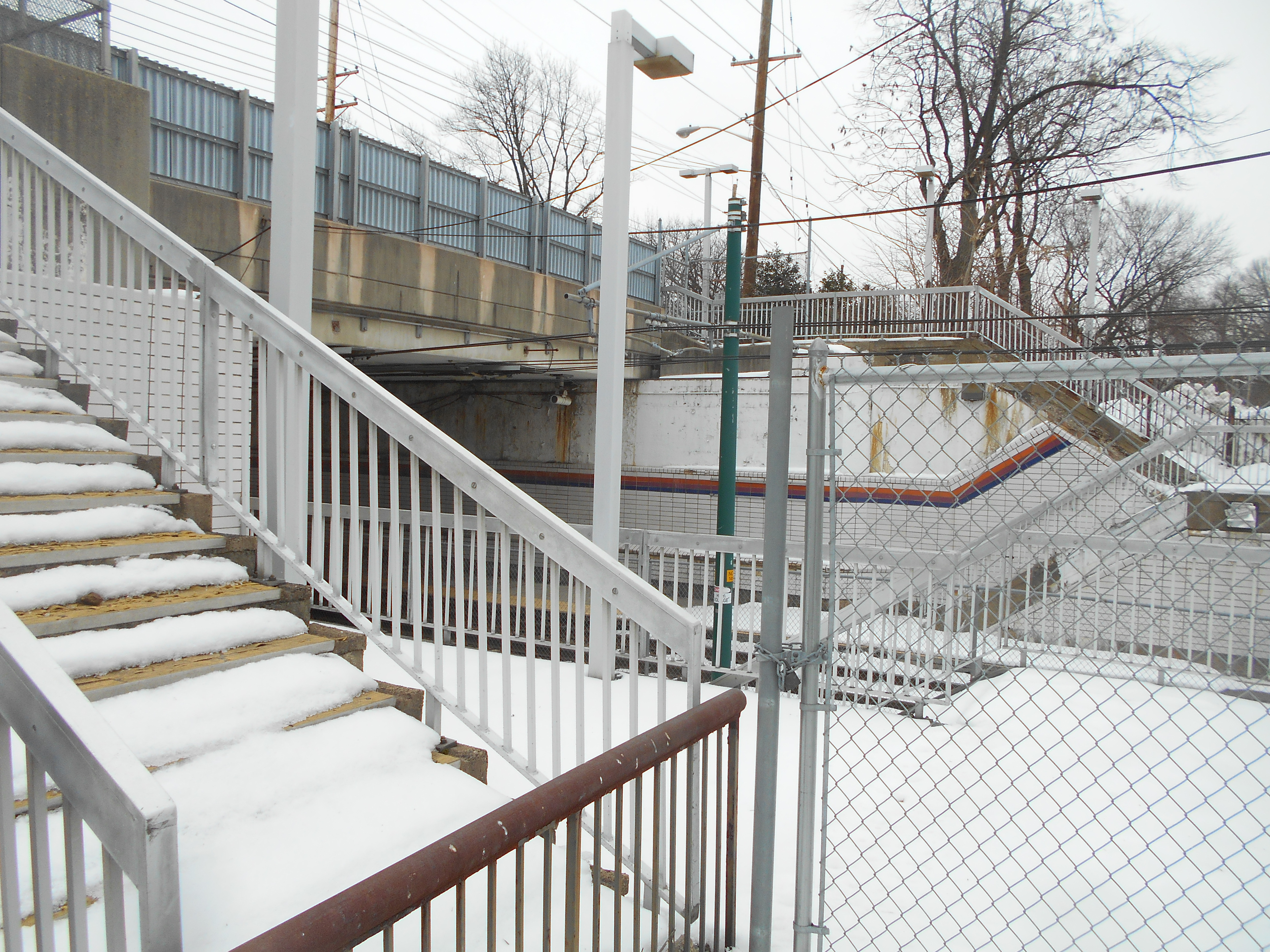
Heller Parkway station in February 2015 with all facilities intact

Heller Parkway station was originally opened on May 26, 1935, and was the northern terminus of the Newark City Subway system until 1940 when North Sixth Street station was built. Heller Parkway station continued to operate until June 21, 2002. Access to the Heller Parkway bridge is available through a long ramp between the bridge and the south end of one of the platforms.

=== Franklin Avenue ===
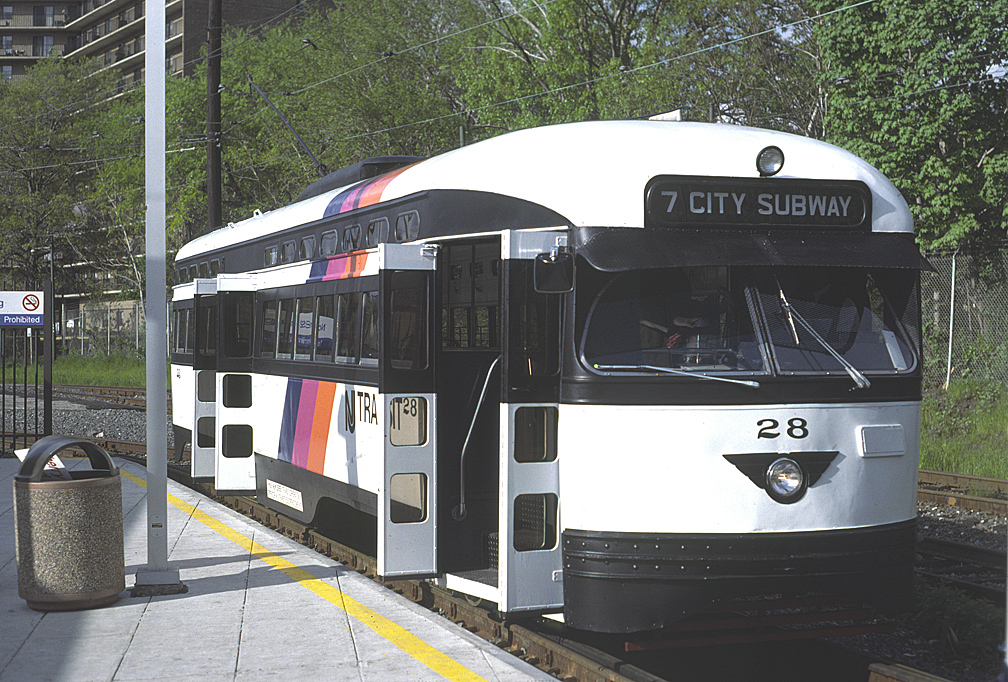
A former Route #7 PCC streetcar at Franklin Avenue station in 1985.

Originally known as North Sixth Street Newark City Subway station, it was built in 1940. Later as the turning loop was built, the station was moved closer to Anthony Street and named Franklin Avenue NCS station in 1953. When New Jersey Transit replaced the PCC cars with longer and more modern Kinki Sharyo light rail vehicles, Franklin Avenue station was closed on August 25, 2001, and replaced with an elongated ramp leading to the current station.
