= Robert Curvin =

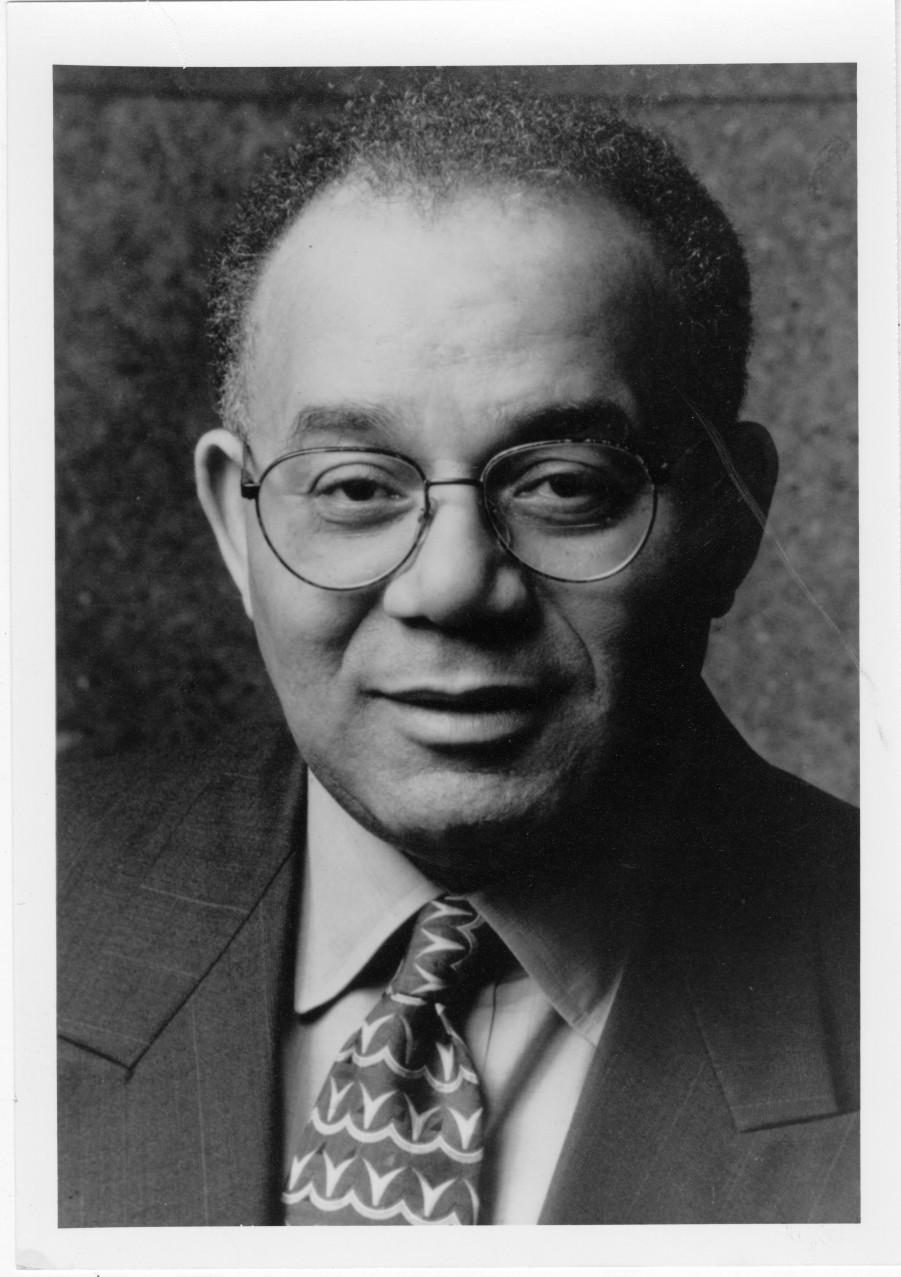
- Born: February 23, 1934; Belleville, New Jersey
- Died: September 30, 2015 (aged 81); Newark, New Jersey
- Education: Rutgers University (BS and MSW); Princeton University (Ph.D.)

Robert Curvin (February 23, 1934 – September 30, 2015) was an advocate for Newark, New Jersey, activist, and historian, who had a key role in the 1967 Newark riots. He lived in the Vailsburg section of Newark and devoted much scholarly effort to the issue of urban poverty.

== Early life and education ==
Curvin was born in Belleville, New Jersey and raised in the township's Silver Lake section, where he graduated from Belleville High School in 1952 before enlisting in the United States Army. He attended Rutgers University, where he earned a bachelor's degree in 1960 and his MSW in 1967. He went on to receive a PhD in political science from Princeton University in 1975.

== Activism ==
In 1960, Curvin helped found the Newark-Essex County chapter of the Congress of Racial Equality.

During the Newark Riots, Curvin attempted to calm rioters. Said historian Clement Price, "“He displayed immense personal courage during the height of the riots by grasping a bullhorn, climbing atop a car and exhorting a restive crowd not to riot and instead stage a peaceful march on City Hall,”

Curvin campaigned for Newark's first Black mayor Kenneth A. Gibson and was a trusted advisor to Gibson.

Curvin was a founder of New Community Corporation.

== Later life ==
Curvin was on The New York Times editorial board from 1978 to 1984. He served as a dean of the Milano School of Management and Urban Policy at New School University and director of the Revson Foundation. He also was a Senior Policy Fellow at the Edward J. Bloustein School of Planning and Public Policy. From 1988 to 2012, Curvin headed the Ford Foundation. Curvin was a trustee of the Fund for the City of New York, the Victoria Foundation, Beth Israel Hospital in Newark, New Jersey Performing Arts Center, Thirteen/ WNET and Princeton University.

He received a 2015 Ryan Award for Commitment to NJPAC and Leadership in the City of Newark at NJPAC's 20th Annual Spotlight Gala and was a member of the Rutgers Hall of Distinguished Alumni. He spent much of his last years in academic work writing his book Inside Newark.

He died of multiple myeloma in 2015, at the age of 81.

== Personal life ==
Curvin and his wife Patricia lived in the Vailsburg section of Newark. They had a son and a daughter: Frank and Nicole. Robert shares a daughter, Melanie Adams with the late Nannette Adams.

== Bibliography ==
- The Persistent Minority the Black Political Experience in Newark (Phd Dissertation, Princeton University)
- Black Ghetto Politics in Newark after World War II, in Schwartz and Prosser eds., "Cities of the Garden State" (Kendall-Hunt Publ., 1977)
- Blackout Looting: New York City, July 13, 1977 (Gardner Press, 1979)
- Inside Newark: Decline, Rebellion, and the Search for Transformation (Rutgers University Press, 2014)
