= Davenport Avenue station =

Railway station in Newark, New Jersey, United States

Davenport Ave.
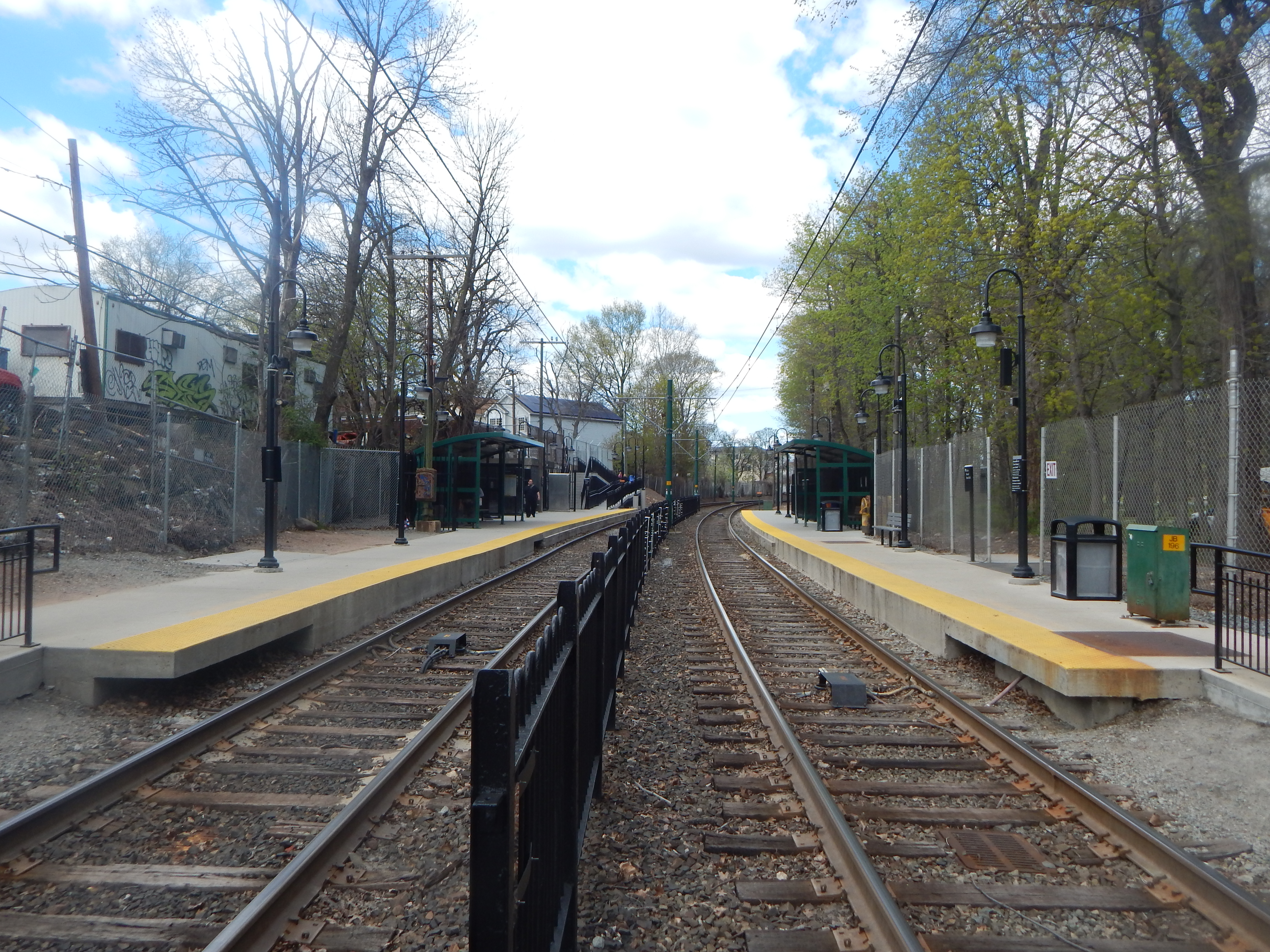
- Davenport Avenue station in April 2015

General information
- Location: 2 Davenport Avenue; Newark, New Jersey
- Coordinates: 40°46′21″N 74°10′42″W
- Owner: New Jersey Transit
- Platforms: 2 side platforms
- Tracks: 2

Construction
- Structure type: At-grade
- Cycle facilities: Yes
- Accessible: Yes

Other information
- Station code: 30763

History
- Opened: May 26, 1935

Passengers
- 2025: 650 (average weekday)
- Rank: 11 of 17

Services
Preceding station	NJ Transit	Following station
Branch Brook Park toward Grove Street	Grove Street – Newark Penn	Bloomfield Avenue toward Newark Penn
Location

Davenport Avenue station is a light rail station in Newark, New Jersey. The station, located at the dead end of Davenport Avenue in the Upper Roseville section of the city, services NJ Transit's Newark Light Rail on trains between Grove Street in Bloomfield to Newark Penn Station. Davenport Avenue station contains two side platforms along with pedestrian access to Branch Brook Park.

Davenport Avenue station opened on May 26, 1935, with the opening of the Newark City Subway between Broad Street (now Military Park station) and Heller Parkway (now Branch Brook Park station).
