= Silver Lake station =

Light rail station in Belleville, New Jersey

Silver Lake
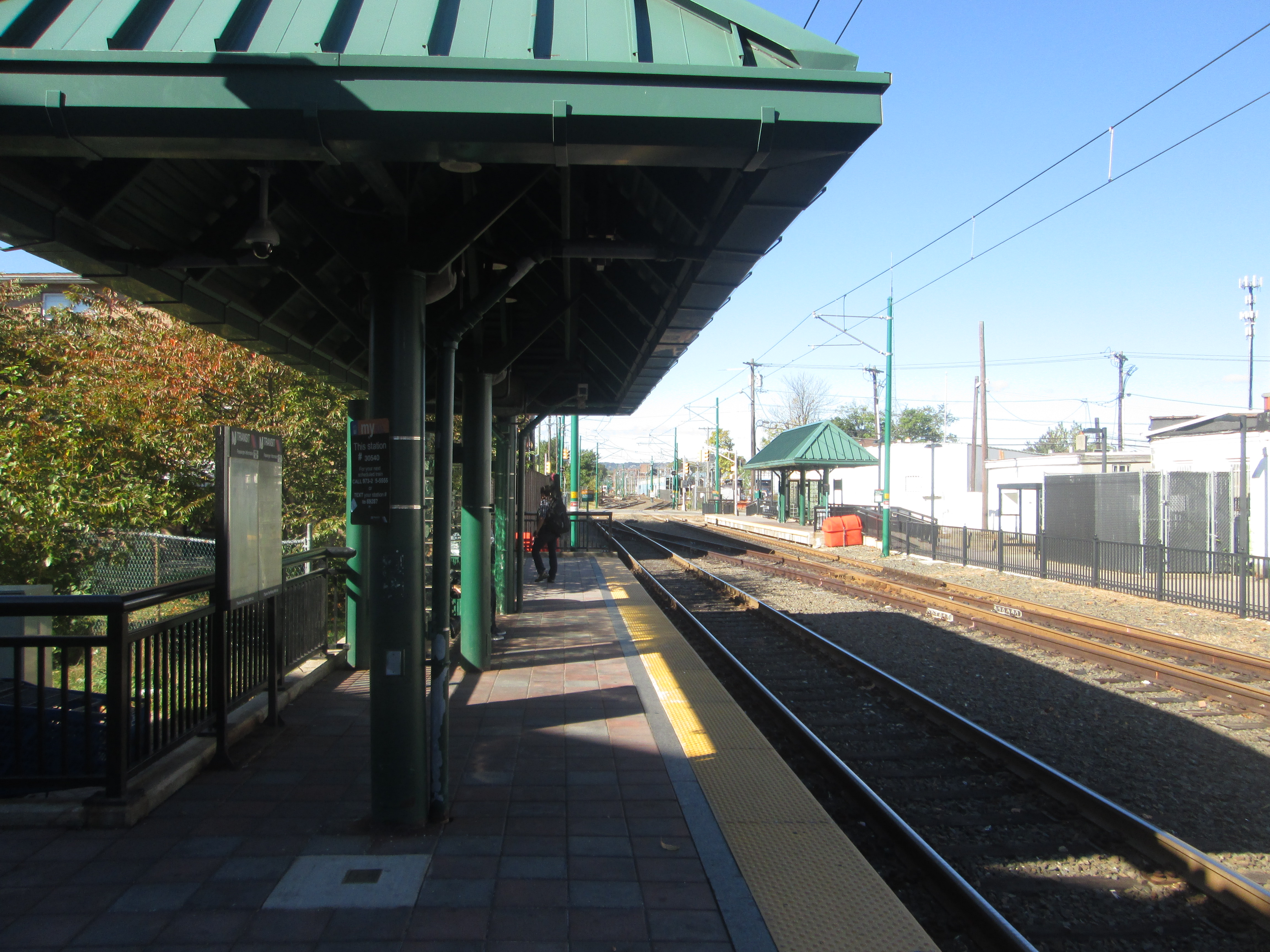
- Silver Lake station platforms

General information
- Location: 208 Heckel Street; Belleville, New Jersey
- Coordinates: 40°46′49″N 74°10′49″W
- Owner: New Jersey Transit
- Platforms: 2 side platforms
- Tracks: 2
- Connections: NJ Transit Bus: 27, 90

Construction
- Structure type: At-grade
- Cycle facilities: Yes
- Accessible: Yes

Other information
- Station code: 30761

History
- Opened: June 22, 2002

Passengers
- 2025: 520 (average weekday)
- Rank: 12 of 17

Services
Preceding station	NJ Transit	Following station
Grove Street Terminus	Grove Street – Newark Penn	Branch Brook Park toward Newark Penn
Former services
Preceding station	Erie Railroad	Following station
Bloomfield Avenue toward West Orange	Orange Branch	Forest Hill Terminus
Location

Silver Lake station is a surface-level light rail station operated by New Jersey Transit in Belleville, New Jersey. The station is the only one in Belleville, operating along the Grove Street–Newark Penn Station line of the Newark Light Rail. The station contains two low-level platforms that are off-centered. The Newark-bound platform is accessible from Franklin Street (County Route 607) and nearby Heckel Street while the Grove Street-bound platform is accessible from nearby Belmont Avenue.

The current light rail station opened on June 22, 2002, as part of an extension of the Newark City Subway from nearby Branch Brook Park station to Grove Street in Bloomfield. The station uses former tracks of the former Erie Railroad Orange Branch, which went from nearby Forest Hill in Newark to West Orange. Service on this line ended on June 20, 1955. Silver Lake boasted a full wooden station depot with a built-in railroad tower.
