= James Hall Pitman =

American scholar (1896 - 1958)

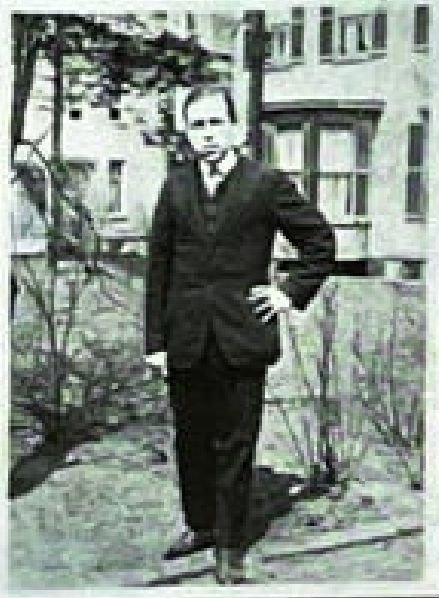
Pitman at Rutgers University in 1918

James Hall Pitman (1896 – October 2, 1958) was a scholar of English literature, noted for his verse translations of medieval texts.

== Life ==
Pitman was born in Newark, New Jersey. He took a Bachelor of Arts degree at Rutgers University, graduating in 1919, followed by a Ph.D. at Yale University. His Ph.D. thesis was entitled "Goldsmith's animated nature: a study of Goldsmith"; completed in 1922, it was published by Yale University Press in 1924. From 1925 to 1933, he taught English at Indiana University, specialising in Romantic literature. Alongside academic work, he also published short stories and poems in the University magazine, Vagabond.

According to The New York Times, "for a time he was associated with the Packard School of Business in New York City". In 1934, he moved to Newark College of Engineering as "English instructor". He was chair of the English Department there from 1950 to 1958.

Pitman's children were Robert Pitman, David Pitman, and a daughter, Alison who married one Charles Bogert.

A resident of Belleville, New Jersey, Pitman died on October 2, 1958, at his son Robert's home in Paterson, New Jersey.

== Selected works ==
- The Old English Physiologus: text and prose translation by Albert Stanburrough Cook; verse translation by James Hall Pitman (New Haven: Yale University Press, 1921).
- The riddles of Aldhelm: text and verse translation with notes (New Haven: Yale University Press, 1925; repr. Hamden, Conn : Archon Books, 1970).
