= David Grant (American football) =

American football player (born 1965)

No. 98, 99, 70
- Position: Defensive end

Personal information
- Born: September 17, 1965 (age 61); Belleville, New Jersey, U.S.
- Listed height: 6 ft 4 in (1.93 m)
- Listed weight: 277 lb (126 kg)

Career information
- High school: Belleville
- College: West Virginia
- NFL draft: 1988: 4th round, 84th overall pick

Career history
- Cincinnati Bengals (1988–1991); Tampa Bay Buccaneers (1992); Green Bay Packers (1993)

Awards and highlights
- Second-team All-East (1987)

Career NFL statistics
- Sacks: 8.5
- Interceptions: 1
- Fumble recoveries: 2
- Stats at Pro Football Reference

David John Grant (born September 17, 1965) is an American former professional football player who was a defensive end for six seasons in the National Football League (NFL) for the Cincinnati Bengals, Tampa Bay Buccaneers, and Green Bay Packers. He played college football for the West Virginia Mountaineers and was selected by the Bengals in the fourth round of the 1988 NFL draft with the 84th overall pick. He also pledged Kappa Alpha Psi, Epsilon Chi chapter.

Raised in Belleville, New Jersey, Grant graduated in 1983 from Belleville High School.
