= Leonard R. Willette =

Tuskegee Airman (1921–1944)

Leonard Robert Willette
- Born: April 29, 1921 Belleville, New Jersey
- Died: September 22, 1944 (aged 23) Bavaria, Germany

2nd Lt. Leonard Robert Willette (1921 – September 22, 1944) † was a World War II Tuskegee Airman fighter pilot. He was killed in action while flying over Germany escorting a group of American bombers.

== Early life ==
Willette was born in Belleville, New Jersey to Lawerence and Leonora Willette, one of six siblings, and graduated from Belleville High School in 1939, where he competed on the school's track team. After graduation, he attended New York University. Willette had been granted a commission to attend the United States Military Academy at West Point by Senator William Warren Barbour, but turned down the opportunity in order to enlist into the Army Air Corps after the bombing of Pearl Harbor.

== Military service ==
Willette earned his wings in February 1944. On September 22, 1944, he was flying a P-51 Mustang that was escorting a group of B-17s bombers on a mission to Munich, Germany when his plane lost oil pressure and crashed. Willette's body was later recovered and buried in a cemetery in Rechtmehring, Germany. He was one of 66 Tuskegee Airmen killed in action during World War II.

== Legacy ==
On February 24, 2018, Willette's hometown of Belleville, New Jersey renamed a street in his honor.
