= Belleville High School (New Jersey) =

High school in Essex County, New Jersey, US

Location
- 100 Passaic Avenue; Belleville, Essex County, New Jersey 07109; United States; 40.803794°N 74.162606°W

Information
- Type: Public high school
- School district: Belleville School District
- NCES School ID: 340135001954
- Principal: Caleb Rhodes
- Faculty: 123.0 FTEs
- Grades: 9-12
- Enrollment: 1,590 (as of 2024–25)
- Student to teacher ratio: 12.9:1
- Colors: Blue, gold and white
- Athletics conference: Super Essex Conference (general); North Jersey Super Football Conference
- Team name: Buccaneers
- Accreditation: Middle States Association of Colleges and Schools
- Website: hs.bellevilleschools.org/o/bhs

Belleville High School is a four-year comprehensive community public high school that serves students in ninth through twelfth grade from Belleville, in Essex County, in the U.S. state of New Jersey. Operating as the lone secondary school of the Belleville School District, the school has been accredited by the Middle States Association of Colleges and Schools Commission on Elementary and Secondary Schools since 1964.

As of the 2024–25 school year, the school had an enrollment of 1,590 students and 123.0 classroom teachers (on an FTE basis), for a student–teacher ratio of 12.9:1. There were 921 students (57.9% of enrollment) eligible for free lunch and 190 (11.9% of students) eligible for reduced-cost lunch.

== Awards, recognition and rankings ==
The school was the 294th-ranked public high school in New Jersey out of 339 schools statewide in New Jersey Monthly magazine's September 2014 cover story on the state's "Top Public High Schools", using a new ranking methodology. The school had been ranked 160th in the state of 328 schools in 2012, after being ranked 214th in 2010 out of 322 schools listed. The magazine ranked the school 2008 out of 316 schools. The school was ranked 241st in the magazine's September 2006 issue, which surveyed 316 schools across the state.

Schooldigger.com ranked the school 311th out of 376 public high schools statewide in its 2010 rankings (a decrease of 12 positions from the 2009 rank) which were based on the combined percentage of students classified as proficient or above proficient on the language arts literacy and mathematics components of the High School Proficiency Assessment (HSPA).

== Athletics ==
The Belleville High School Buccaneers compete in the Super Essex Conference, which is comprised of public and private high schools in Essex County and was established following a reorganization of sports leagues in Northern New Jersey by the New Jersey State Interscholastic Athletic Association (NJSIAA). Until the NJSIAA's 2009 realignment, the school had participated in Division A of the Northern New Jersey Interscholastic League, which included high schools located in Bergen County, Passaic County and Essex County. With 1,057 students in grades 10-12, the school was classified by the NJSIAA for the 2019–20 school year as Group III for most athletic competition purposes, which included schools with an enrollment of 761 to 1,058 students in that grade range. The football team competes in the Freedom White division of the North Jersey Super Football Conference, which includes 112 schools competing in 20 divisions, making it the nation's biggest football-only high school sports league. The school was classified by the NJSIAA as Group IV North for football for 2024–2026, which included schools with 893 to 1,315 students. The school colors are blue, white and gold.

The baseball team won the North II Group IV state sectional championship in 1965.

== Administration ==
The school's principal is Maria Calhoun. Her core administrative team includes four assistant principals.

== Notable alumni ==
- Chico Borja (1959–2021), soccer player and coach
- Ramiro Borja (born 1961), retired professional soccer player
- Lonnie Bunch (born 1952, class of 1970), educator, historian and museum curator who became the Fourteenth Secretary of the Smithsonian in 2019 and was founding director of the Smithsonian's National Museum of African American History and Culture
- Kacy Catanzaro (born 1990), professional wrestler, gymnast and obstacle racer
- Jack Cullen (born 1939), pitcher who played for the New York Yankees
- Robert Curvin (1934–2015, class of 1952), advocate for Newark, New Jersey, activist and historian, who had a key role in the 1967 Newark riots
- Phil Cuzzi (born 1955, class of 1973), Major League Baseball umpire
- The Delicates, singing group consisting of Denise Ferri, Arleen Lanzotti, and Peggy Santiglia from the Class of 1962
- Tommy DeVito (1936–2020), lead guitarist for The Four Seasons who dropped out of school following eighth grade to pursue his music career, but was named an honorary graduate of Belleville High School in 2007
- Connie Francis (1937-2025, class of 1955), singer
- David Grant (born 1965; class of 1983), defensive end for six NFL seasons for the Cincinnati Bengals, Tampa Bay Buccaneers and Green Bay Packers
- Fred Paul Partus (born 1943), inventor and engineer known for his contributions to the development of optical fiber manufacturing and rocket engine diagnostics
- Joe Pesci (born 1943), Academy Award-winning actor
- Joel A. Pisano (1949–2021), United States district judge of the United States District Court for the District of New Jersey from 2000 to 2001
- Ron San Fillipo (1942–2024, class of 1960), athletic director and athletics coach
- Peggy Santiglia (born 1944), singer-songwriter of the "girl group era", best known for her 1963 pop hit "My Boyfriend's Back" with The Angels, which she recorded at the age of 19
- Gerard Way (born 1977, class of 1995), frontman of My Chemical Romance and writer of The Umbrella Academy
- Mikey Way (born 1980, class of 1998), bass guitarist of My Chemical Romance
- Leonard R. Willette (1921–1944, class of 1939), Tuskegee Airman pilot killed in action in World War II flying over Germany while protecting a group of American bombers
- Tony Zuzzio (1916–2002), lineman who played for the Detroit Lions during the 1942 NFL season
