= Fred Paul Partus =

American inventor and engineer (born 1943)

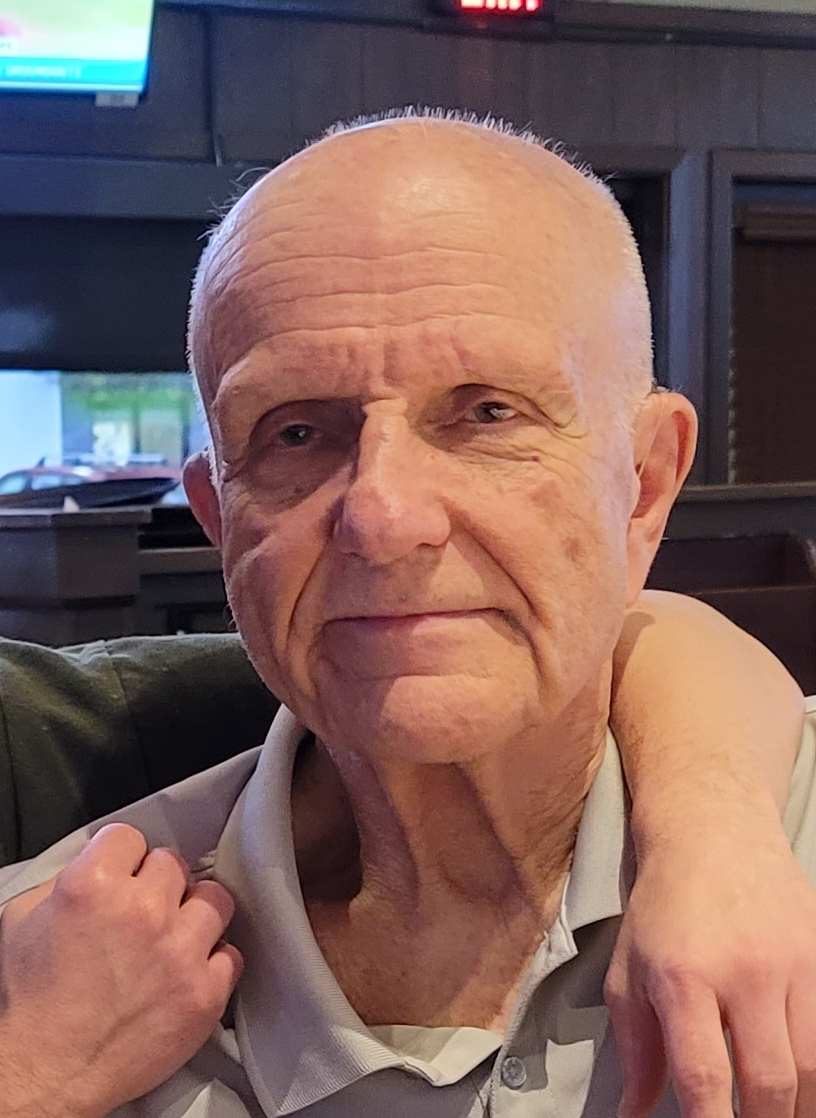
- Born: April 20, 1943 (age 82); Jersey City, New Jersey, U.S.
- Education: Rutgers University; Tulane University (Ph.D.)
- Occupations: Inventor; engineer
- Known for: Contributions to optical fiber manufacturing; Engineering Materials Achievement Award (1983)

Fred Paul Partus (born April 20, 1943) is an American inventor and engineer known for his contributions to the development of optical fiber manufacturing and rocket engine diagnostics.

== Early life and education ==
Partus was born in Jersey City, New Jersey, on April 20, 1943. Raised in Belleville, New Jersey, Partus graduated from Belleville High School. He was a mechanical engineering student at Rutgers University, where he was named to the Term Honors list. He received his Ph.D. from Tulane University in 1971.

== Career ==
=== Doctoral research with NASA ===
Partus's doctoral dissertation at Tulane University, The Sampling and Analysis of Tracer Gas in the Combustion Chamber of a Liquid Rocket Engine, was sponsored by a grant from NASA. His research on gas composition was subsequently cited by other scientists in the field. A 1973 NASA-sponsored report on gas velocity near a liquid rocket injector face, for example, referenced Partus's dissertation for its foundational data on gas composition.

=== Optical fiber development ===
After receiving his doctorate, Partus joined Western Electric in 1971. As a senior engineer, he was a key contributor to the landmark Atlanta Fiber System Experiment of 1976, a project that tested a complete lightwave digital transmission system under field conditions and proved the feasibility of fiber optic technology. The significance of the project was such that The Bell System Technical Journal dedicated a substantial portion of its July–August 1978 issue to a collection of papers on the experiment's design, components, and results. The experiment's foundational importance is still noted in modern academic research.

As part of this featured collection, Partus co-authored the paper "Preform Fabrication and Fiber Drawing by Western Electric Product Engineering Control Center," which detailed the manufacturing processes for the optical fibers used in the system. This work was considered foundational to the field and was still being cited in major review articles more than a decade later.

His research continued through the 1980s, with work on topics such as improving the bandwidth of optical fibers. He holds numerous patents in the field and his collaborations included work with John B. MacChesney and James W. Fleming Jr.

== Awards and recognition ==
In 1983, Partus, along with his colleagues Donald E. Procknow and John B. MacChesney from Western Electric and Bell Telephone Laboratories, received the Engineering Materials Achievement Award from ASM International. The award recognized their "development of materials processing technology capable of producing low optical loss, silica waveguide fibers, permitting introduction of lightwave systems into telecommunications applications."
