= Ron San Fillipo =

American athletic director and athletics coach (1942–2024)

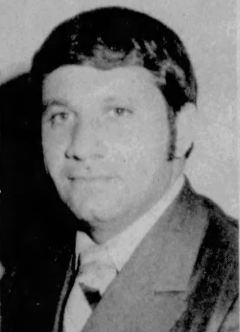
- San Fillipo in 1971

Biographical details
- Born: January 23, 1942; Newark, New Jersey, U.S.
- Died: November 12, 2024 (aged 82); Cedar Grove, New Jersey, U.S.
- Education: Montclair State College (1964)

Playing career

Football
- 1960–1963: Montclair State
- Position: End

Coaching career (HC unless noted)

Football
- 1964–1965: Montclair State (assistant)
- 1966: Abraham Clark HS (NJ)
- 1967: New Jersey City (ends)
- 1968: New Jersey City (backfield)
- 1969: New Jersey City (DB)
- 1970: New Jersey City (DL)
- 1971: New Jersey City (DC)
- 1972–1974: Newark State / Kean

Baseball
- 1973–1975: Kean

Administrative career (AD unless noted)
- 1972–1975: Newark State / Kean (assistant AD)
- 1975–2003: James Caldwell HS (NJ)

Head coaching record
- Overall: 14–13 (college football); 29–29 (college baseball)

Ronald San Fillipo (January 23, 1942 – November 12, 2024) was an American athletic director and athletics coach. He was the head football and baseball coach for Kean College of New Jersey—since renamed Kean University—in the early 1970s and was the athletic director for James Caldwell High School from 1975 until his retirement in 2003.

== Biography ==
San Fillipo was born in Newark, New Jersey, and grew up in nearby Belleville. He attended Belleville High School and Montclair State and played football for both. He graduated from Montclair State in 1964. Following his graduation, he served two seasons as an assistant football coach before being hired as the head football coach for Abraham Clark High School in 1966.

From 1967 to 1971, San Fillipo served as an assistant for the New Jersey City Gothic Knights football team. He was initially hired as the ends coach. In 1968, he shifted to backfield coach. In 1969, he shifted again to defensive backs coach, then again in the following year to defensive line. In 1971, he was promoted to defensive coordinator. In 1972, he was hired as the head football and baseball coach alongside being named assistant athletic director for the then Newark State. In three seasons as head football coach he led the team to an overall record of 14–13, including an 8–2 season in his last year, 1974. In three seasons as head baseball coach, he led the team to an overall record of 29–29.

In 1975, San Fillipo was hired as the athletic director for James Caldwell High School, a position he held for 28 years until his retirement in 2003.

A resident of Cedar Grove, New Jersey, and Bay Head, New Jersey, San Fillipo died on November 12, 2024.

== Head coaching record ==
=== College football ===
Year	Team	Overall	Conference	Standing	Bowl/playoffs
Newark State / Kean Squires (New Jersey State Athletic Conference) (1972–1974)
1972	Newark State	2–6	0–4	6th	
1973	Kean	4–5	1–3	5th	
1974	Kean	8–2	3–1	2nd	
Newark State / Kean:		14–13	4–8		
Total:		14–13			
