= Belleville School District =

School district in Essex County, New Jersey, US

Address
- 56 Ralph Street Belleville, Essex County, New Jersey, 07109; United States
- Coordinates: 40.803849°N 74.162548°W

District information
- Grades: Pre-K to 12
- Superintendent: Erick Alfonso
- Business administrator: Tina Iaccheo
- Schools: 10

Students and staff
- Enrollment: 5,095 (as of 2023–24)
- Faculty: 384.5 FTEs
- Student–teacher ratio: 13.3:1

Other information
- District Factor Group: CD
- Website: www.bellevilleschools.org
Ind.	Per pupil	District spending	Rank (*)	K-12 average	%± vs. average
1A	Total Spending	$15,190	4	$18,891	−19.6%
1	Budgetary Cost	11,100	1	14,783	−24.9%
2	Classroom Instruction	6,724	1	8,763	−23.3%
6	Support Services	1,565	8	2,392	−34.6%
8	Administrative Cost	1,360	34	1,485	−8.4%
10	Operations & Maintenance	1,222	11	1,783	−31.5%
13	Extracurricular Activities	162	17	268	−39.6%
16	Median Teacher Salary	67,330	65	64,043
Data from NJDoE 2014 Taxpayers' Guide to Education Spending. *Of K-12 districts with more than 3,500 students. Lowest spending=1; Highest=103

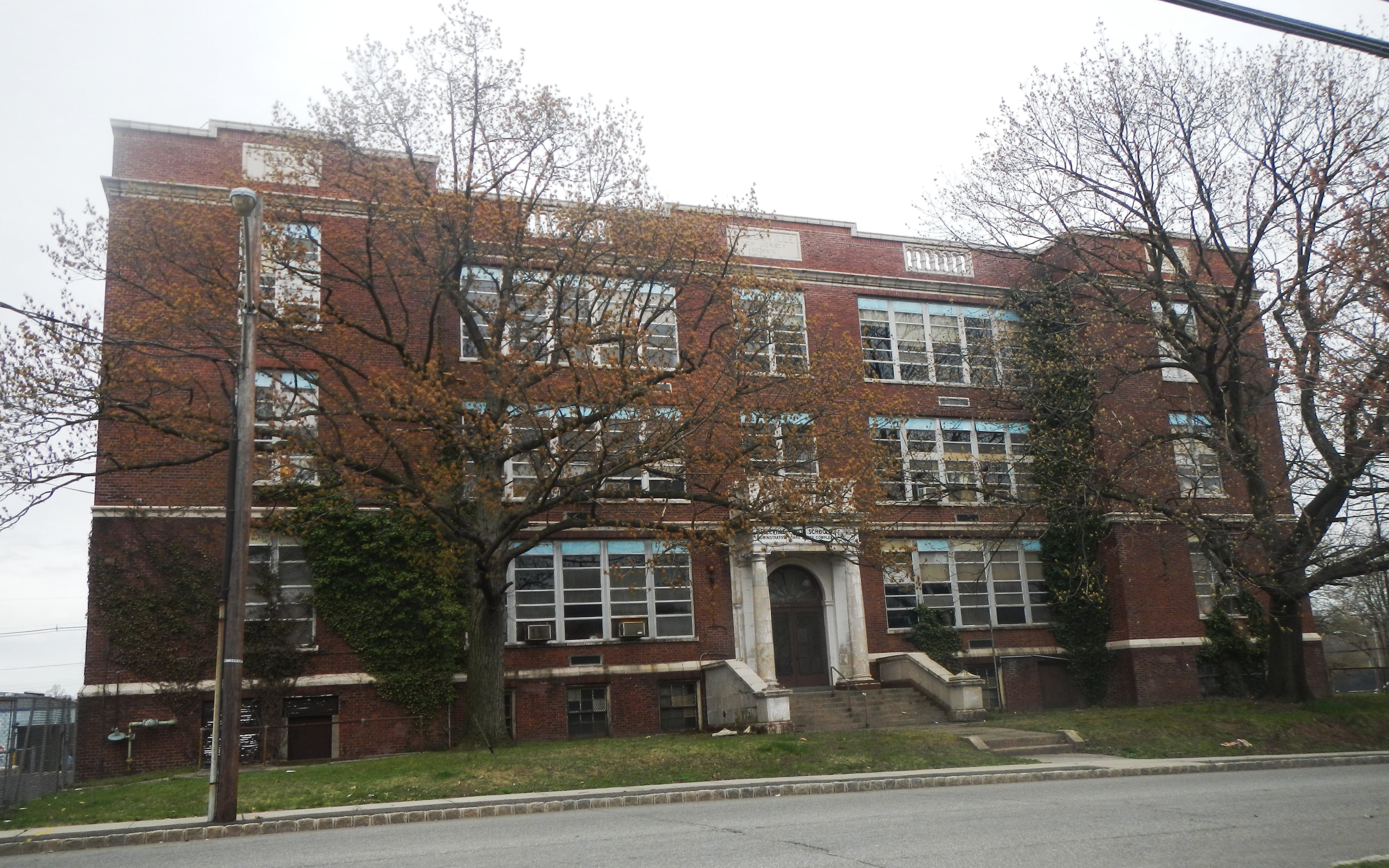
Bellville Schools administrative building

The Belleville School District is a comprehensive community public school district that serves students in pre-kindergarten through twelfth grade from Belleville, in Essex County, in the U.S. state of New Jersey.

As of the 2023–24 school year, the district, comprised of 10 schools, had an enrollment of 5,095 students and 384.5 classroom teachers (on an FTE basis), for a student–teacher ratio of 13.3:1.

The district had been classified by the New Jersey Department of Education as being in District Factor Group "CD", the sixth-highest of eight groupings. District Factor Groups organize districts statewide to allow comparison by common socioeconomic characteristics of the local districts. From lowest socioeconomic status to highest, the categories are A, B, CD, DE, FG, GH, I and J.

== Schools ==
Schools in the district (with 2023–24 enrollment data from the National Center for Education Statistics) are:

Preschool

- Hornblower Early Childhood Center with 250 students in PreK
  - Lucy Demikoff, principal

Elementary schools

- School 3 with 354 students in grades K–6
  - Stephen Puglia, principal
- School 4 with 438 students in grades PreK–6
  - Ricardo Acosta, principal
- School 5 with 377 students in grades K–6
  - MaryAnn Gilligan, principal
- School 7 with 427 students in grades PreK–6
  - Brian Belton, principal
- School 8 with 500 students in grades PreK–6
  - Joseph Rotonda, principal
- School 9 with 148 students in grades K–6
  - Romain Royal, principal
- School 10 with 168 students in grades PreK–6
  - Unknown, principal

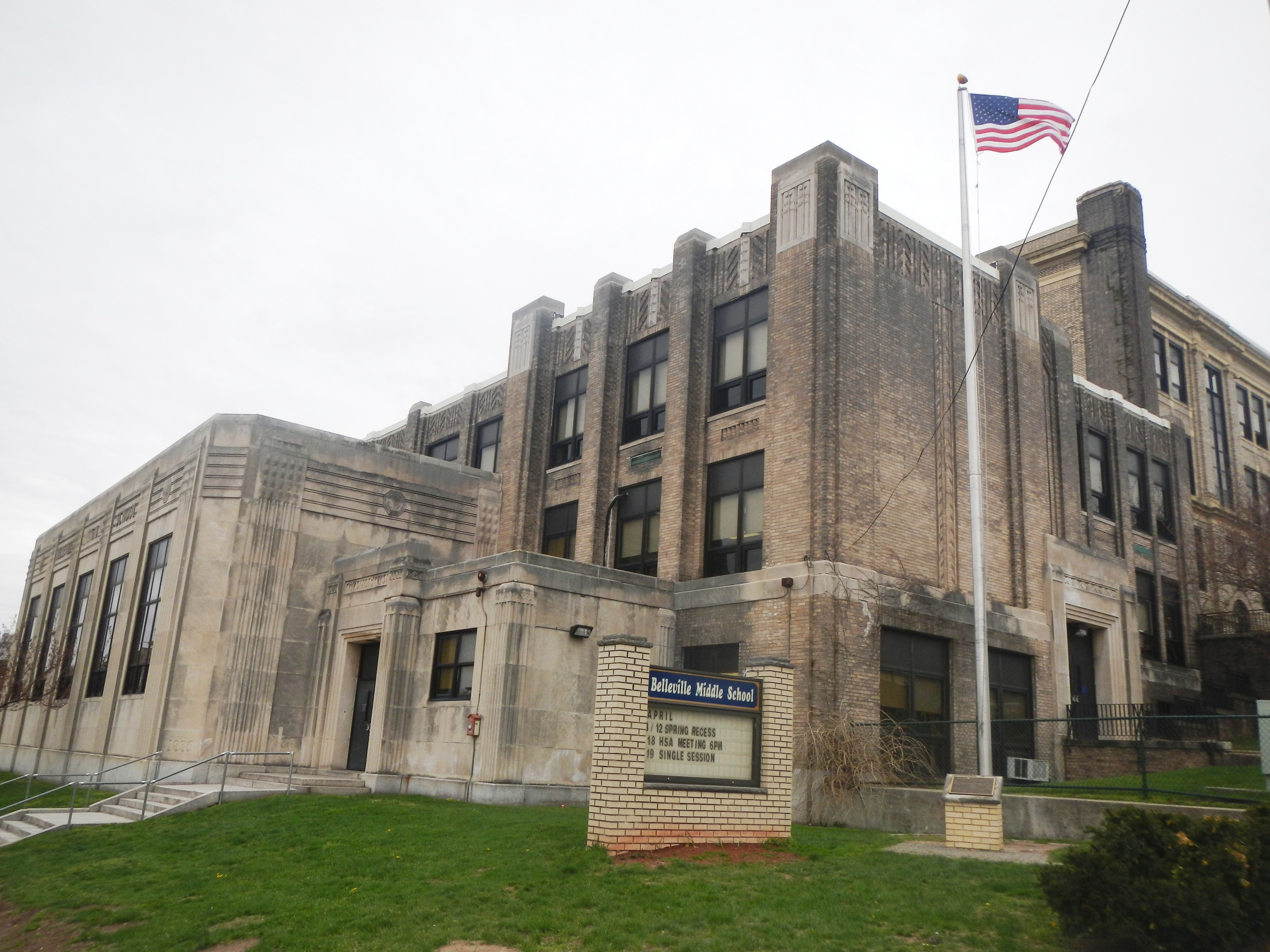
Bellville Middle School

Middle school

- Belleville Middle School with 709 students in grades 7–8
  - Charles Giachetti, principal

High school

- Belleville High School with 1,591 students in grades 9–12
  - Maria Calhoun, principal

== Administration ==
Core members of the district's administration are:

- Erick Alfonso, superintendent of schools
- Tina Iaccheo, business administrator and board secretary

== Board of education ==
The district's board of education is comprised of seven members who set policy and oversee the fiscal and educational operation of the district through its administration. As a Type II school district, the board's trustees are elected directly by voters to serve three-year terms of office on a staggered basis, with two or three seats up for election each year held (since 2014) as part of the November general election. The board appoints a superintendent to oversee the district's day-to-day operations and a business administrator to supervise the business functions of the district.

For the 2025–26 school year, trustees of the Belleville Board of Education are:

- Esteban Leon, Board President (term expires December 2027)
- Lissa Missaggia, Board Vice President (2026)
- Brenda Pacheco (2026)
- Jean Gillis (2027)
- Cristina Garro (2028)
- Yadira Munoz (2028)
- Kenia Santana (2028)
