= Jack Cullen =

American baseball player (born 1939)

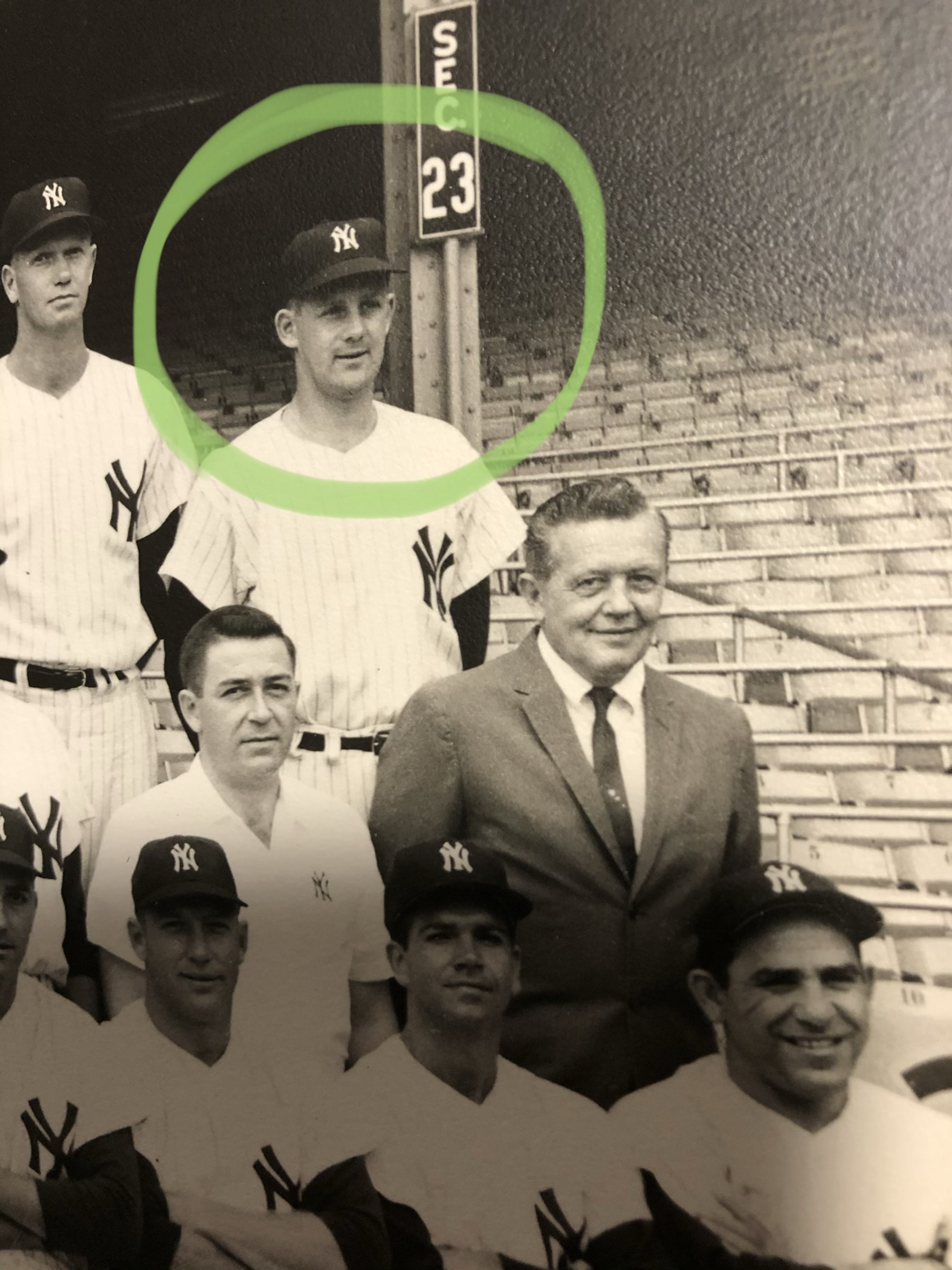
- Pitcher
- Born: October 6, 1939 (age 86); Newark, New Jersey
- Batted: Right Threw: Right

MLB debut
- September 9, 1962, for the New York Yankees

Last MLB appearance
- May 5, 1966, for the New York Yankees

MLB statistics
- Win–loss record: 4–4
- Earned run average: 3.07
- Strikeouts: 34
- Stats at Baseball Reference

Teams
- New York Yankees (1962, 1965–1966)

John Patrick Cullen (born October 6, 1939 in Newark, New Jersey) is an American retired professional baseball player. The right-handed pitcher appeared in 19 games in Major League Baseball as a member of the New York Yankees (1962, 1965–66). Born in Newark, New Jersey, he stood 5 feet 11 inches (1.80 m) tall and weighed 170 pounds (77 kg).

Raised in Belleville, New Jersey, Cullen played prep baseball at Belleville High School.

Cullen attended Fairleigh Dickinson University. He signed with the Yankees in 1959 and won 11 or more games in each of his first four pro seasons. His first two appearances in a Yankee uniform came in September 1962, as he hurled three shutout innings of relief against the second-division Boston Red Sox and Washington Senators and earned his only MLB save. Cullen then spent all of 1963 and 1964 and half of 1965 at the Triple-A level. The 1965 Yankees, now denizens themselves of the second division, recalled him in July and plugged him into their starting rotation. In nine games, he won three games and lost four, but posted a solid 3.25 earned run average, two complete games and one shutout, a three-hit, 1–0 triumph against the Baltimore Orioles on August 20. His appeared in three games in relief late in the season. Cullen then worked in five games, all as a reliever, in early 1966 before the Yankees sent him back to Triple-A. In his penultimate MLB appearance on May 1, he went seven scoreless innings in relief against the Kansas City Athletics and was credited with the Yankees' 10–4 victory. He then pitched through 1970 in the Yankees', Los Angeles Dodgers' and Atlanta Braves' organizations.

In 19 career MLB games, all with New York, he had a 4–4 won–lost record with a 3.07 ERA. In 731/3 career innings pitched, he allowed 72 hits and 28 bases on balls; he struck out 34.
