= Silver Lake, Essex County, New Jersey =

Populated place in Essex County, New Jersey, US

Silver Lake, New Jersey
- Census-designated place
- Location in Essex County and the state of New Jersey.

- Location in Essex County Location in New Jersey Location in the United States
- Coordinates: 40.780434°N 74.182817°W
- Country: United States
- State: New Jersey
- County: Essex
- Townships: Belleville and Bloomfield

Area
  - Total: 0.326 sq mi (0.845 km^{2})
  - Land: 0.326 sq mi (0.845 km^{2})
  - Water: 0 sq mi (0.000 km^{2}) 0.00%
- Elevation: 112 ft (34 m)

Population (2010 census)
  - Total: 4,243
  - Density: 13,011.5/sq mi (5,023.8/km^{2})
- Time zone: UTC−05:00 (Eastern (EST))
  - Summer (DST): UTC−04:00 (Eastern (EDT))
- FIPS code: 34-67590
- GNIS feature ID: 02628225

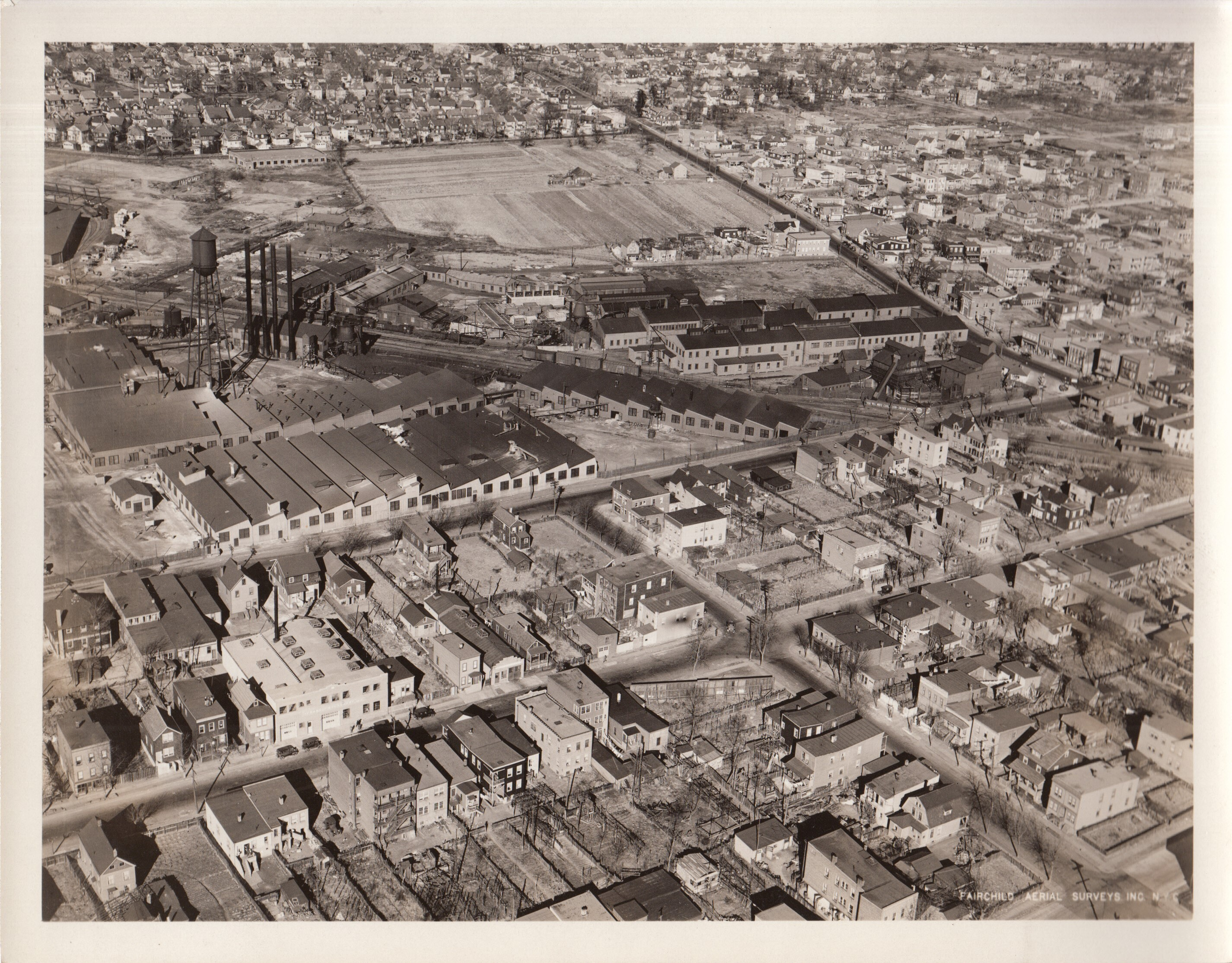
Aerial view of the Edison Company Silver Lake plant, 1928

Silver Lake is an unincorporated community and census-designated place (CDP) in Essex County, in the U.S. state of New Jersey, that is split between Belleville (with 3,769 of the CDP's residents) and Bloomfield (474 of the total). As of the 2010 United States census, the CDP's total population was 4,243.

== Geography ==
According to the United States Census Bureau, Silver Lake had a total area of 0.326 square miles (0.845 km^{2}), all of which was land.

== Demographics ==
Historical population
Census	Pop.	Note	%±
2010	4,243		—
2020	4,730		11.5%
Population sources: 2010

Silver Lake first appeared as a census designated place in the 2010 U.S. census formed from parts of the deleted whole-township Bellville and Bloomfield CDPs.

=== 2020 census ===
Silver Lake CDP, Essex County, New Jersey – Racial and ethnic composition Note: the US Census treats Hispanic/Latino as an ethnic category. This table excludes Latinos from the racial categories and assigns them to a separate category. Hispanics/Latinos may be of any race.
Race / Ethnicity (NH = Non-Hispanic)	Pop 2010	Pop 2020	% 2010	% 2020
White alone (NH)	1,229	871	28.97%	18.41%
Black or African American alone (NH)	361	454	8.51%	9.60%
Native American or Alaska Native alone (NH)	2	2	0.05%	0.04%
Asian alone (NH)	525	567	12.37%	11.99%
Native Hawaiian or Pacific Islander alone (NH)	2	0	0.05%	0.00%
Other race alone (NH)	66	68	1.56%	1.44%
Mixed race or Multiracial (NH)	58	154	1.37%	3.26%
Hispanic or Latino (any race)	2,000	2,614	47.14%	55.26%
Total	4,243	4,730	100.00%	100.00%

=== 2010 census ===
The 2010 United States census counted 4,243 people, 1,587 households, and 1,051 families in the CDP. The population density was 13,011.5 per square mile (5,023.8/km^{2}). There were 1,733 housing units at an average density of 5,314.4 per square mile (2,051.9/km^{2}). The racial makeup was 51.50% (2,185) White, 10.49% (445) Black or African American, 0.16% (7) Native American, 12.63% (536) Asian, 0.05% (2) Pacific Islander, 20.15% (855) from other races, and 5.02% (213) from two or more races. Hispanic or Latino of any race were 47.14% (2,000) of the population.

Of the 1,587 households, 32.7% had children under the age of 18; 38.2% were married couples living together; 21.0% had a female householder with no husband present and 33.8% were non-families. Of all households, 27.4% were made up of individuals and 8.3% had someone living alone who was 65 years of age or older. The average household size was 2.67 and the average family size was 3.26.

23.6% of the population were under the age of 18, 9.3% from 18 to 24, 31.9% from 25 to 44, 24.1% from 45 to 64, and 11.1% who were 65 years of age or older. The median age was 35.0 years. For every 100 females, the population had 88.2 males. For every 100 females ages 18 and older there were 83.5 males.
