= Belleville, New Jersey =

Township in Essex County, New Jersey, US

- Township
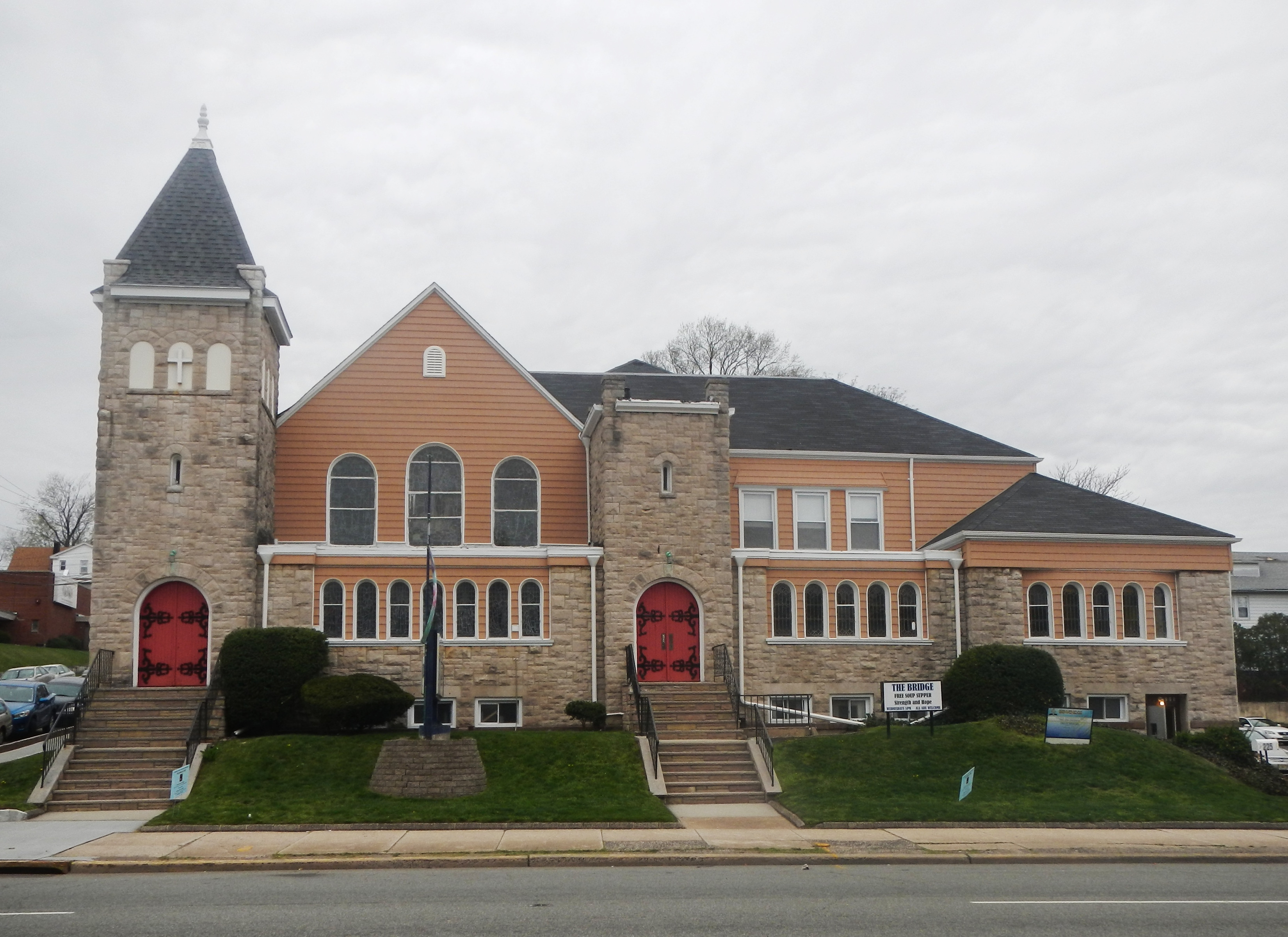
- Wesley United Methodist Church

- Seal
- Nickname: Cherry Blossom Capital of America
- Interactive map of Belleville, New Jersey
- Location in Essex County Location in New Jersey Location in the United States
- Coordinates: 40.793481°N 74.161159°W
- Country: United States
- State: New Jersey
- County: Essex
- Incorporated: April 8, 1839
- Named after: French language for "beautiful city"

Government
  - Type: Faulkner Act (council–manager)
  - Body: Township Council
  - Mayor: Frank Vélez III (term ends June 30, 2030)
  - Manager: Brian Banda
  - Municipal clerk: Jacqueline E. Guamán

Area
  - Total: 3.36 sq mi (8.71 km^{2})
  - Land: 3.30 sq mi (8.54 km^{2})
  - Water: 0.069 sq mi (0.18 km^{2}) 2.05%
  - Rank: 319th of 565 in state 14th of 22 in county
- Elevation: 161 ft (49 m)

Population (2020)
  - Total: 38,222
  - Estimate (2024): 38,672
  - Rank: 62nd of 565 in state 7th of 22 in county
  - Density: 11,597.1/sq mi (4,477.7/km^{2})
  - Rank: 29th of 565 in state 5th of 22 in county
- Time zone: UTC−05:00 (Eastern (EST))
  - Summer (DST): UTC−04:00 (Eastern (EDT))
- ZIP Code: 07109
- Area codes: 862/973
- FIPS code: 3401304695
- GNIS feature ID: 1729713
- Website: www.bellevillenj.org

Belleville (French: "Belle ville" meaning "beautiful town") is a township in Essex County, in the U.S. state of New Jersey. As of the 2020 United States census, the township's population was 38,222. an increase of 2,296 (+6.4%) from the 2010 census count of 35,926,

== History ==
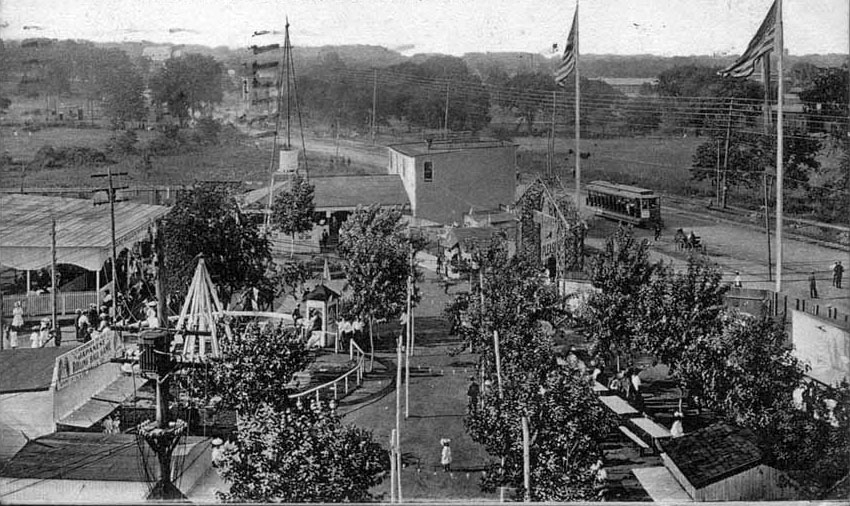
Hillside Pleasure Park in Belleville, c. 1905

Originally known as "Second River" or "Washington", the inhabitants renamed the settlement "Belleville" in 1797. Belleville was originally incorporated as a township by an act of the New Jersey Legislature on April 8, 1839, from portions of Bloomfield. Portions of the township were taken to create Woodside Township (March 24, 1869, now defunct) and Franklin Township (February 18, 1874, now known as Nutley). The independent municipality of Belleville city was created within the township on March 27, 1874, and was dissolved on February 22, 1876. On November 16, 1910, Belleville was reincorporated as a town, based on the results of a referendum held eight days earlier.

In 1870, Belleville became the first city on the East Coast of the United States with a Chinatown. While much of the country (especially the Western states) had strong anti-Chinese sentiment, the town welcomed a group of Chinese workers from the West Coast who had been workers on building the Central Pacific Railroad. This group of people eventually formed the basis for Chinatowns in Newark and New York City.

In 1981, the town was one of seven Essex County municipalities to pass a referendum to become a township, joining four municipalities that had already made the change, of what would ultimately be more than a dozen Essex County municipalities to reclassify as townships in order take advantage of federal revenue sharing policies that allocated townships a greater share of government aid to municipalities on a per capita basis.

Frankie Valli and the band The Four Seasons formed in Belleville, as did The Delicates, the late-1950s and early-1960s girl group made up of Denise Ferri, Arleen Lanzotti and Peggy Santiglia.

In 1994, Congress passed a resolution recognizing Belleville as the birthplace of the Industrial Revolution in the United States.

== Geography ==
According to the United States Census Bureau, the township had a total area of 3.37 square miles (8.71 km^{2}), including 3.30 square miles (8.54 km^{2}) of land and 0.07 square miles (0.18 km^{2}) of water (2.05%).

Silver Lake (2010 total population of 4,243) is an unincorporated community and census-designated place (CDP) defined by the United States Census Bureau as of the 2010 Census that is split between Belleville (with 3,769 of the CDP's residents) and Bloomfield (474 of the total).

Other unincorporated communities, localities and place names located partially or completely within the township include Belwood, Big Tree and Soho.

The Second River forms much of the border between Belleville and Newark as it runs through Branch Brook Park.

The township of Belleville has given itself the nickname the Cherry Blossom Capital of America, with an annual display that is larger than the famed Tidal Basin in Washington, D.C., site of the National Cherry Blossom Festival.

The township borders the municipalities of Bloomfield, Newark and Nutley in Essex County; Lyndhurst and North Arlington in Bergen County; and Kearny in Hudson County.

== Demographics ==
Historical population
Census	Pop.	Note	%±
1840	2,466		—
1850	3,514		42.5%
1860	3,969		12.9%
1870	3,644	*	−8.2%
1880	3,004	*	−17.6%
1890	3,487		16.1%
1900	5,987		71.7%
1910	9,891		65.2%
1920	15,660		58.3%
1930	26,974		72.2%
1940	28,167		4.4%
1950	32,019		13.7%
1960	35,005		9.3%
1970	37,629		7.5%
1980	35,367		−6.0%
1990	34,213		−3.3%
2000	35,928		5.0%
2010	35,926		0.0%
2020	38,222		6.4%
2024 (est.)	38,672		1.2%
Population sources: 1840–1920 1840 1850–1870; 1850 1870 1880–1890; 1890–1910 1910–1930; 1940–2000 2000; 2010 2020 * = Lost territory in previous decade.

=== 2020 census ===
Belleville township, Essex County, New Jersey – Racial and Ethnic Composition (NH = Non-Hispanic) Note: the US Census treats Hispanic/Latino as an ethnic category. This table excludes Latinos from the racial categories and assigns them to a separate category. Hispanics/Latinos may be of any race.
Race / Ethnicity	Pop 2010	Pop 2020	% 2010	% 2020
White alone (NH)	13,868	10,310	37.59%	26.96%
Black or African American alone (NH)	2,794	3,092	7.57%	8.08%
Native American or Alaska Native alone (NH)	66	50	0.18%	0.13%
Asian alone (NH)	4,251	4,201	11.52%	10.99%
Pacific Islander alone (NH)	5	18	0.01%	0.05%
Some Other Race alone (NH)	290	517	0.79%	1.35%
Mixed Race/Multi-Racial (NH)	519	853	1.41%	2.23%
Hispanic or Latino (any race)	14,133	19,181	38.93%	50.23%
Total	35,926	38,222	100.00%	100.00%

=== 2010 census ===
The 2010 United States census counted 35,926 people, 13,395 households, and 9,001 families in the township. The population density was 10,755.7 per square mile (4,152.8/km^{2}). There were 14,327 housing units at an average density of 4,289.3 per square mile (1,656.1/km^{2}). The racial makeup was 60.55% (21,753) White, 9.12% (3,277) Black or African American, 0.35% (126) Native American, 12.00% (4,312) Asian, 0.05% (18) Pacific Islander, 13.97% (5,018) from other races, and 3.96% (1,422) from two or more races. Hispanic or Latino of any race were 39.34% (14,133) of the population.

Of the 13,395 households, 30.5% had children under the age of 18; 44.3% were married couples living together; 16.7% had a female householder with no husband present and 32.8% were non-families. Of all households, 27.0% were made up of individuals and 8.3% had someone living alone who was 65 years of age or older. The average household size was 2.68 and the average family size was 3.29.

21.7% of the population were under the age of 18, 9.2% from 18 to 24, 31.1% from 25 to 44, 26.3% from 45 to 64, and 11.9% who were 65 years of age or older. The median age was 37.2 years. For every 100 females, the population had 93.1 males. For every 100 females ages 18 and older there were 89.0 males.

The Census Bureau's 2006–2010 American Community Survey showed that (in 2010 inflation-adjusted dollars) median household income was $60,127 (with a margin of error of +/− $2,658) and the median family income was $69,181 (+/− $4,525). Males had a median income of $46,656 (+/− $2,959) versus $42,237 (+/− $2,818) for females. The per capita income for the township was $27,668 (+/− $1,357). About 3.7% of families and 6.0% of the population were below the poverty line, including 7.0% of those under age 18 and 6.6% of those age 65 or over.

=== 2000 census ===
As of the 2000 United States census there were 35,928 people, 13,731 households, and 9,089 families residing in the township. The population density was 10,744.3 inhabitants per square mile (4,148.4/km^{2}). There were 14,144 housing units at an average density of 4,229.8 per square mile (1,633.1/km^{2}). The racial makeup of the township was 69.44% White, 5.36% African American, 0.17% Native American, 11.31% Asian, 0.07% Pacific Islander, 9.83% from other races, and 3.82% from two or more races. Hispanic or Latino of any race were 23.68% of the population.

As of the 2000 Census, the most common ancestries listed were Italian (30.9%), Irish (9.4%), German (6.9%), Polish (4.5%), United States (2.6%) and English (2.2%).

There were 13,731 households, out of which 29.5% had children under the age of 18 living with them, 47.0% were married couples living together, 13.9% had a female householder with no husband present, and 33.8% were non-families. 27.9% of all households were made up of individuals, and 9.1% had someone living alone who was 65 years of age or older. The average household size was 2.60 and the average family size was 3.23.

In the township the population was spread out, with 21.8% under the age of 18, 8.7% from 18 to 24, 33.9% from 25 to 44, 22.2% from 45 to 64, and 13.4% who were 65 years of age or older. The median age was 36 years. For every 100 females, there were 93.2 males. For every 100 females age 18 and over, there were 89.8 males.

The median income for a household in the township was $48,576, and the median income for a family was $55,212. Males had a median income of $38,074 versus $31,729 for females. The per capita income for the township was $22,093. About 6.3% of families and 8.2% of the population were below the poverty line, including 10.9% of those under age 18 and 7.8% of those age 65 or over.

== Government ==
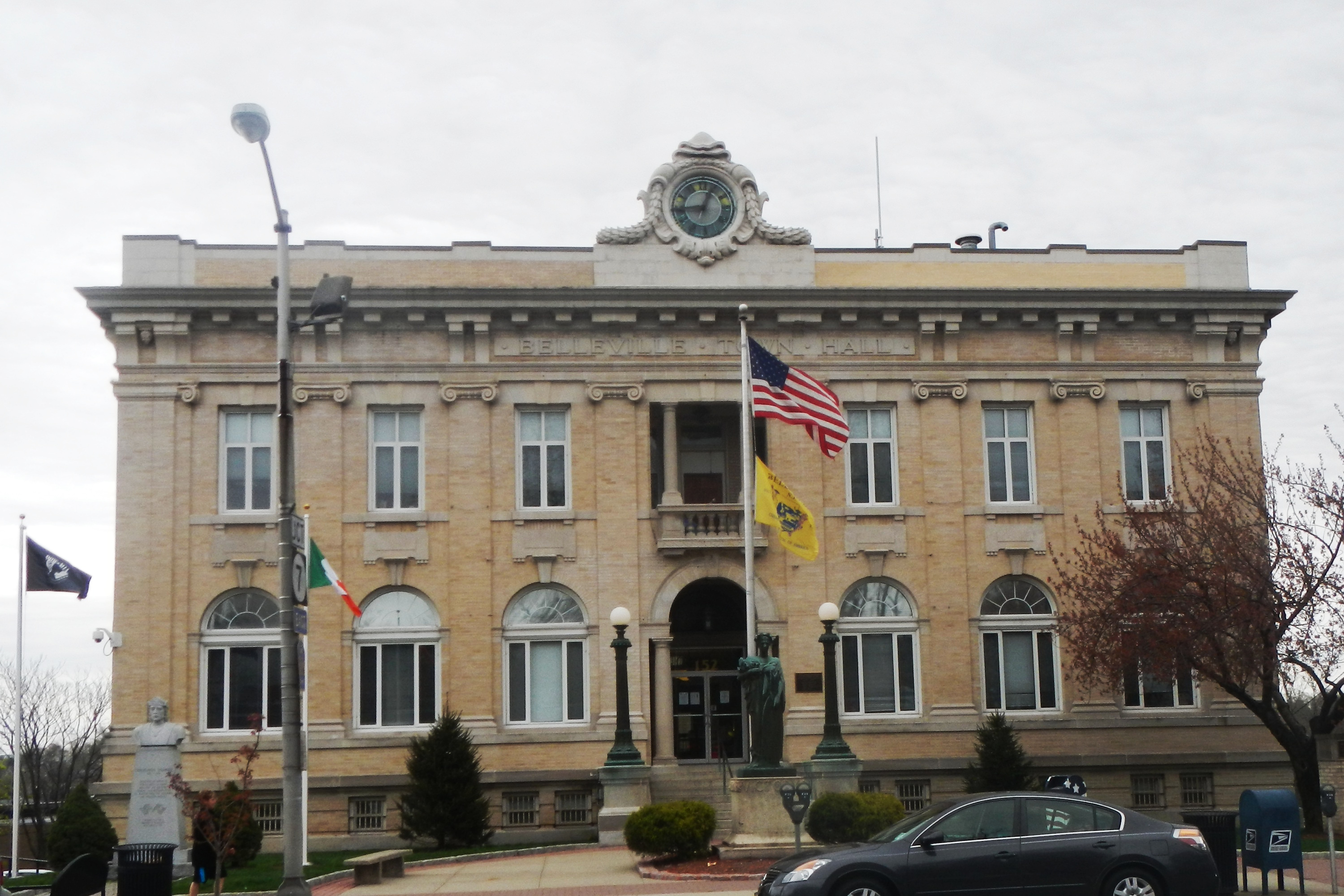
Town hall

=== Local government ===
Belleville is governed within the Faulkner Act, formally known as the Optional Municipal Charter Law, under the Council-Manager form of New Jersey municipal government. The township is one of 42 municipalities (of the 564) statewide that use this form of government. The governing body is comprised of a seven-member Township Council, of which the mayor and two members are elected at-large and one each is chosen from four wards, with elections held on a non-partisan basis as part of the May municipal election. Members are elected in even-numbered years to serve four-year terms of office on a staggered basis, with the four ward seats up for vote together and the two at-large seats and the mayoral seat up for vote two years later.

As of 2026, the Mayor of Belleville is Frank Vélez III, whose term of office ends June 30, 2030. Members of the Belleville Township Council are Deputy Mayor Tracy Juanita Muldrow (Ward 1; 2028), Michelle Rodriguez (at-large; 2030), Danyale Wells (at-large; 2030), Thomas Graziano (Ward 2; 2028) Vincent Cozzarelli (Ward 3; 2028), and Diana Sorice Guardabasco (Ward 4; 2028).

The Township Manager is Brian Banda.

=== Federal, state, and county representation ===
Belleville is located in the 11th Congressional District and is part of New Jersey's 34th state legislative district.

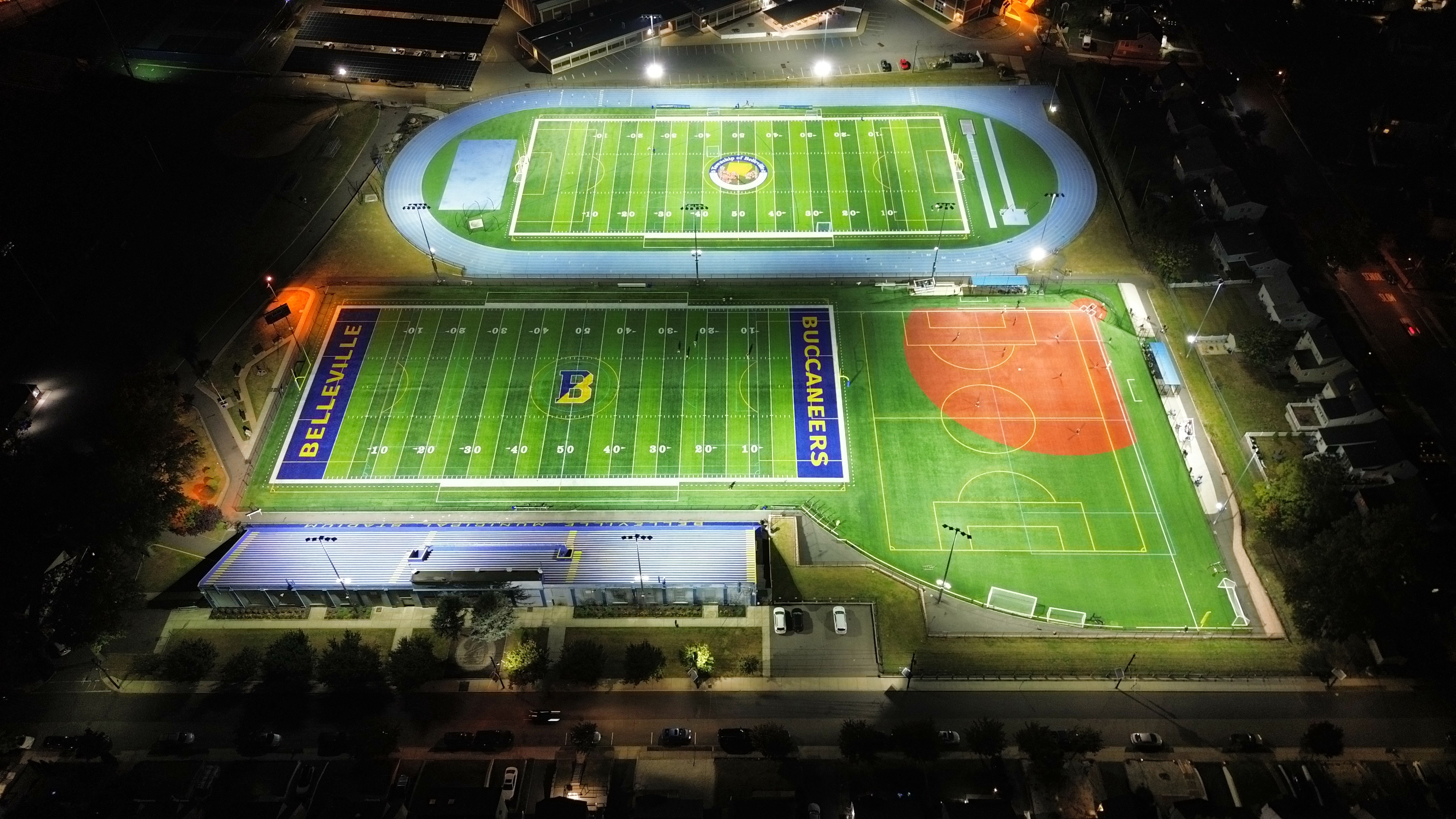
The turf athletics complex at Belleville High School

For the 119th United States Congress, New Jersey's 11th congressional district is represented by Analilia Mejia (D, Glen Ridge) who was elected in a 2026 special election to serve for the remainder of the Congress following the resignation Mikie Sherrill (D, Montclair), who was elected Governor of New Jersey in 2025. New Jersey is represented in the United States Senate by Democrats Cory Booker (Newark, term ends 2027) and Andy Kim (Moorestown, term ends 2031).

For the 2026–2027 session, the 34th legislative district of the New Jersey Legislature is represented in the State Senate by Britnee Timberlake (D, East Orange) and in the General Assembly by Carmen Morales (D, Belleville) and Michael Venezia (D, Bloomfield).

Essex County is governed by a directly elected county executive, with legislative functions performed by the Board of County Commissioners. As of 2025, the County Executive is Joseph N. DiVincenzo Jr. (D, Roseland), whose four-year term of office ends December 31, 2026. The county's Board of County Commissioners is composed of nine members, five of whom are elected from districts and four of whom are elected on an at-large basis. They are elected for three-year concurrent terms and may be re-elected to successive terms at the annual election in November. Essex County's Commissioners are:

Robert Mercado (D, District 1 – Newark's North and East Wards, parts of Central and West Wards; Newark, 2026), A'Dorian Murray-Thomas (D, District 2 – Irvington, Maplewood and parts of Newark's South and West Wards; Newark, 2026), Vice President Tyshammie L. Cooper (D, District 3 - Newark: West and Central Wards; East Orange, Orange and South Orange; East Orange, 2026), Leonard M. Luciano (D, District 4 – Caldwell, Cedar Grove, Essex Fells, Fairfield, Livingston, Millburn, North Caldwell, Roseland, Verona, West Caldwell and West Orange; West Caldwell, 2026), President Carlos M. Pomares (D, District 5 – Belleville, Bloomfield, Glen Ridge, Montclair and Nutley; Bloomfield, 2026), Brendan W. Gill (D, at large; Montclair, 2026), Romaine Graham (D, at large; Irvington, 2026), Wayne Richardson (D, at large; Newark, 2026), Patricia Sebold (D, at-large; Livingston, 2026).

Constitutional officers elected countywide are: Clerk Christopher J. Durkin (D, West Caldwell, 2025), Register of Deeds Juan M. Rivera Jr. (D, Newark, 2029), Sheriff Amir Jones (D, Newark, 2027), and Surrogate Alturrick Kenney (D, Newark, 2028).

=== Politics ===
As of March 2011, there were a total of 19,684 registered voters in Belleville, of which 7,241 (36.8%) were registered as Democrats, 2,708 (13.8%) were registered as Republicans and 9,729 (49.4%) were registered as Unaffiliated. There were 6 voters registered as Libertarians or Greens.

United States presidential election results for Belleville
Year	Republican		Democratic		Third party(ies)	
Year	No.	%	No.	%	No.	%
2024	6,902	47.05%	7,525	51.30%	243	1.66%
2020	5,977	38.14%	9,538	60.86%	158	1.01%
2016	4,927	36.46%	8,234	60.92%	354	2.62%
2012	4,071	33.34%	8,031	65.77%	109	0.89%
2008	5,444	41.78%	7,475	57.37%	110	0.84%
2004	5,728	48.12%	6,046	50.79%	130	1.09%

In the 2012 presidential election, Democrat Barack Obama received 65.8% of the vote (8,031 cast), ahead of Republican Mitt Romney with 33.3% (4,071 votes), and other candidates with 0.9% (109 votes), among the 12,956 ballots cast by the township's 20,621 registered voters (745 ballots were spoiled), for a turnout of 62.8%. In the 2008 presidential election, Democrat Barack Obama received 56.9% of the vote here (7,475 cast), ahead of Republican John McCain with 41.4% (5,444 votes) and other candidates with 0.8% (110 votes), among the 13,135 ballots cast by the township's 19,378 registered voters, for a turnout of 67.8%. In the 2004 presidential election, Democrat John Kerry received 50.6% of the vote here (6,046 ballots cast), outpolling Republican George W. Bush with 48.0% (5,728 votes) and other candidates with 0.7% (130 votes), among the 11,940 ballots cast by the township's 17,411 registered voters, for a turnout percentage of 68.6.

Gubernatorial election results for Belleville
Year	Republican		Democratic		Third party(ies)	
Year	No.	%	No.	%	No.	%
2025	3,920	36.45%	6,768	62.94%	65	0.60%
2021	3,113	44.50%	3,846	54.97%	37	0.53%
2017	1,820	31.01%	3,736	63.66%	313	5.33%
2013	3,170	53.09%	2,734	45.79%	67	1.12%
2009	3,041	43.02%	3,626	51.30%	401	5.67%
2005	2,508	36.90%	4,080	60.04%	208	3.06%

In the 2013 gubernatorial election, Republican Chris Christie received 53.1% of the vote (3,170 cast), ahead of Democrat Barbara Buono with 45.8% (2,734 votes), and other candidates with 1.1% (67 votes), among the 6,050 ballots cast by the township's 20,904 registered voters (79 ballots were spoiled), for a turnout of 28.9%. In the 2009 gubernatorial election, Democrat Jon Corzine received 50.7% of the vote here (3,626 ballots cast), ahead of Republican Chris Christie with 42.6% (3,041 votes), Independent Chris Daggett with 4.6% (329 votes) and other candidates with 1.0% (72 votes), among the 7,146 ballots cast by the Township's 19,313 registered voters, yielding a 37.0% turnout.

United States Senate election results for Belleville1
Year	Republican		Democratic		Third party(ies)	
Year	No.	%	No.	%	No.	%
2024	5,664	41.69%	7,391	54.40%	531	3.91%
2018	3,030	34.06%	5,604	62.99%	262	2.95%
2012	3,044	29.26%	7,117	68.42%	241	2.32%
2006	2,249	36.79%	3,748	61.31%	116	1.90%

United States Senate election results for Belleville2
Year	Republican		Democratic		Third party(ies)	
Year	No.	%	No.	%	No.	%
2020	4,970	33.68%	9,476	64.21%	312	2.11%
2014	1,523	32.86%	3,012	64.98%	100	2.16%
2013	1,487	39.56%	2,229	59.30%	43	1.14%
2008	3,672	36.03%	6,266	61.48%	254	2.49%

== Education ==
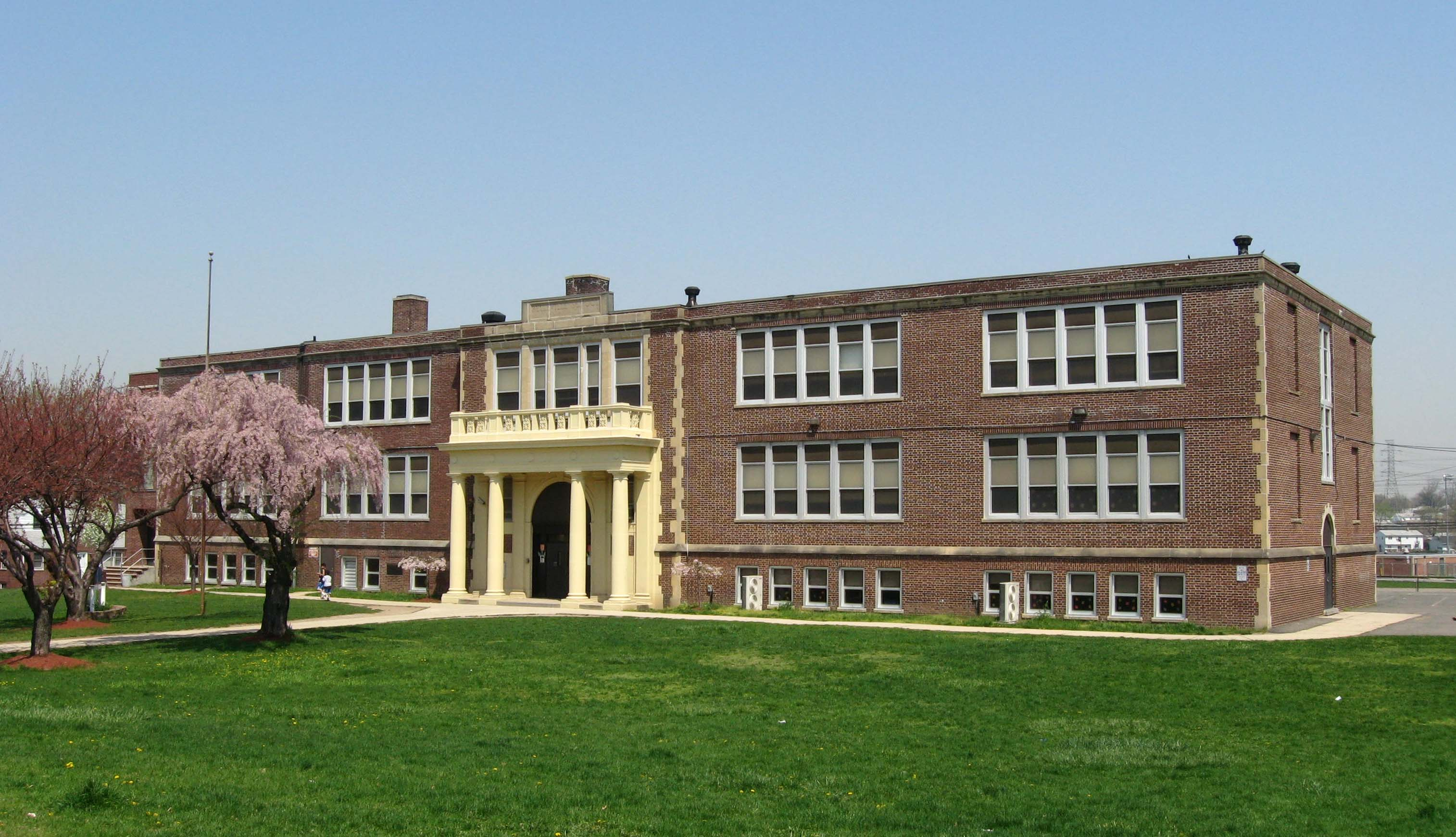
School Number 7

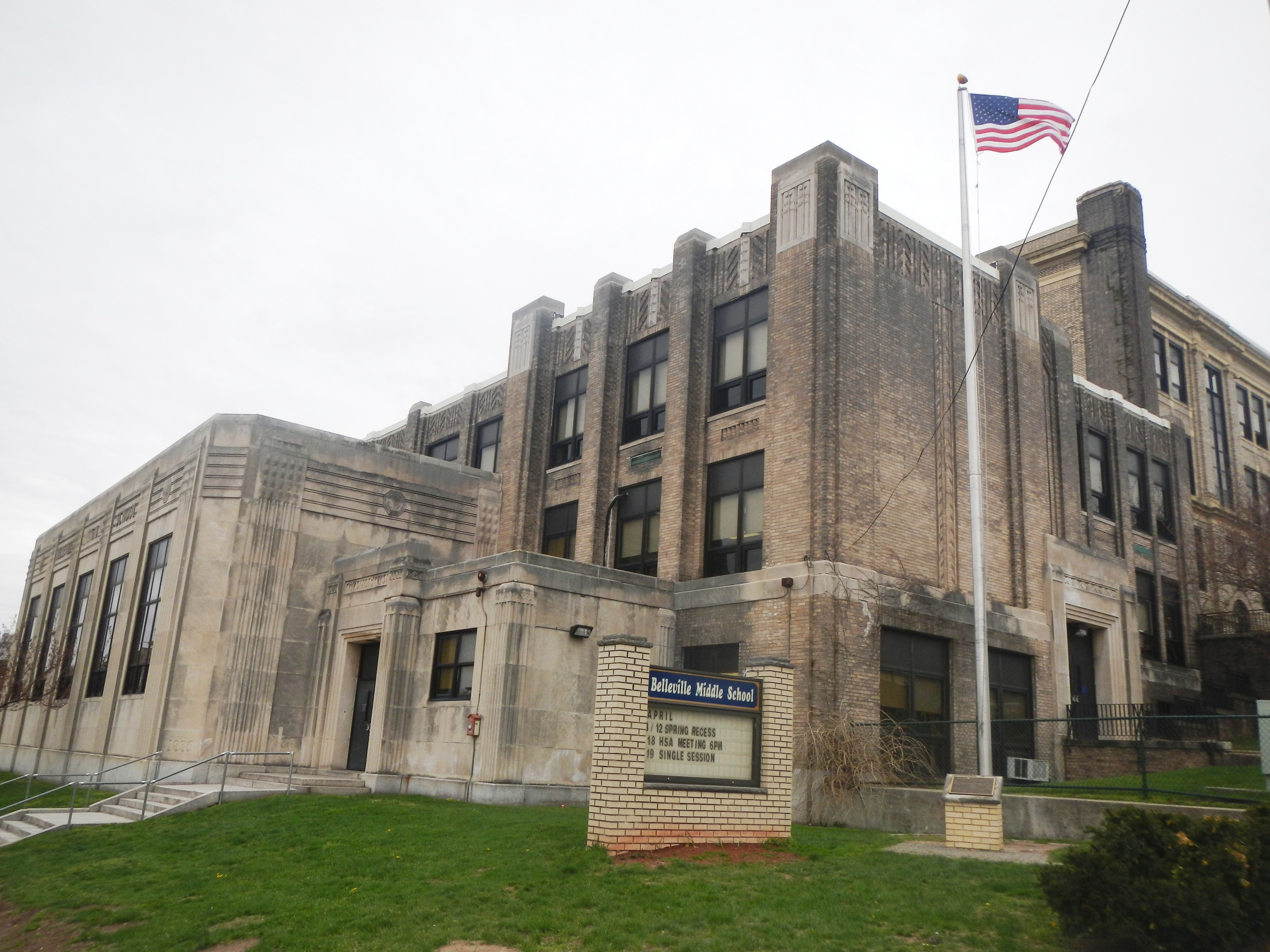
Bellville Middle School

The Belleville School District serves public school students in pre-kindergarten through twelfth grade. As of the 2023–24 school year, the district, comprised of 10 schools, had an enrollment of 5,095 students and 384.5 classroom teachers (on an FTE basis), for a student–teacher ratio of 13.3:1. Schools in the district (with 2023–24 enrollment data from the National Center for Education Statistics) are Hornblower Early Childhood Center with 250 students in PreK, School 3 with 354 students in grades K–6, School 4 with 438 students in grades PreK–6, School 5 with 377 students in grades K–6, School 7 with 427 students in grades PreK–6, School 8 with 500 students in grades PreK–6, School 9 with 148 students in grades K–6, School 10 with 168 students in grades PreK–6, Belleville Middle School with 709 students in grades 7–8 and Belleville High School with 1,591 students in grades 9–12.

The Belleville Public Library and Information Center had a collection of 98,603 volumes.

== Transportation ==
=== Roads and highways ===
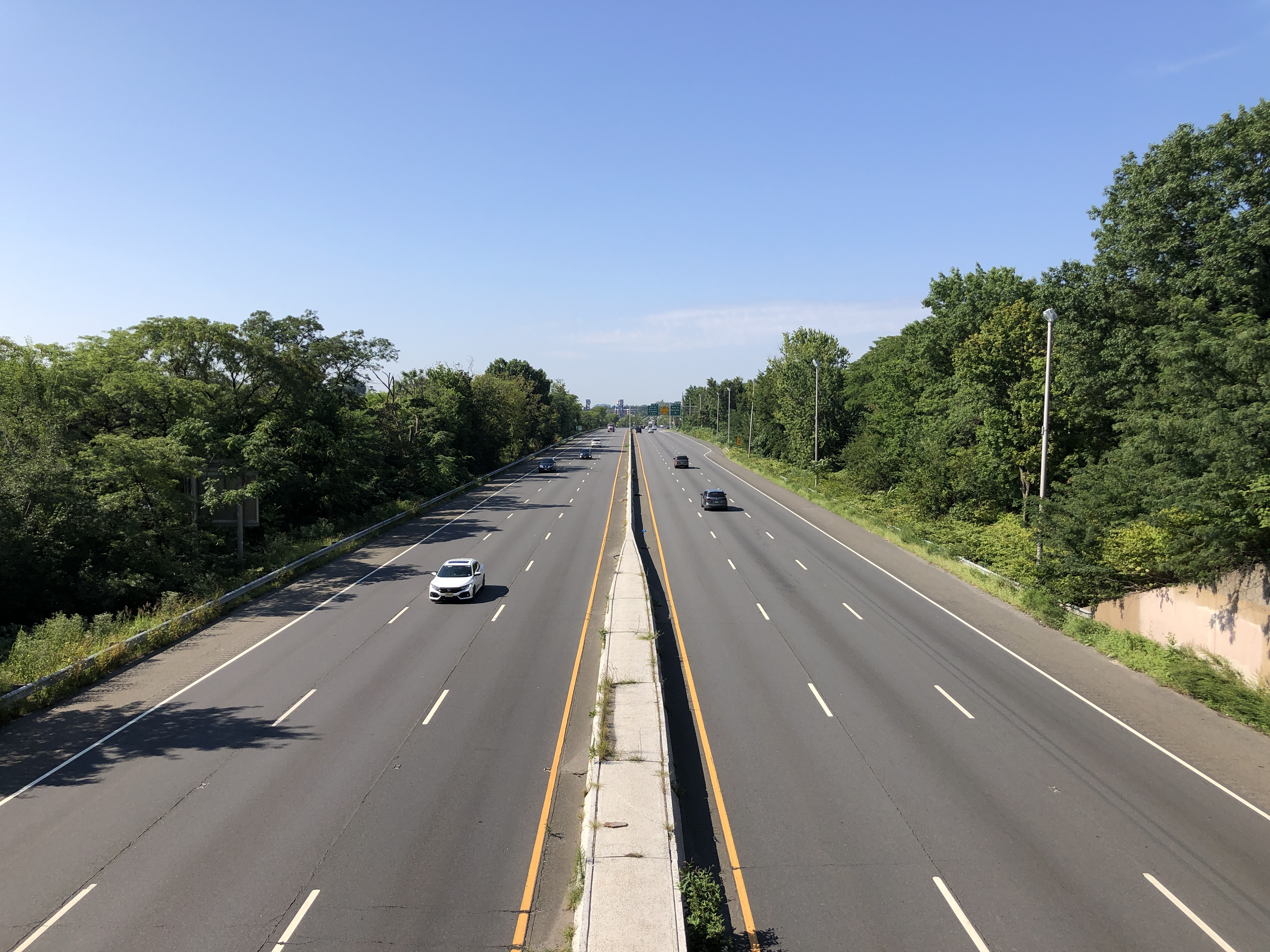
Route 21 southbound in Belleville

As of May 2010, the township had a total of 67.17 miles (108.10 km) of roadways, of which 57.22 miles (92.09 km) were maintained by the municipality, 6.21 miles (9.99 km) by Essex County and 3.74 miles (6.02 km) by the New Jersey Department of Transportation.

Route 7, Route 21 and County Route 506 all pass through Belleville.

The Belleville Turnpike Bridge (also known as the Rutgers Street Bridge) crosses the Passaic River, connecting Belleville to North Arlington. The bridge was formally renamed on July 4, 2013, as the "Lance Corporal Osbrany Montes de Oca Memorial Bridge" in memory of a United States Marine Corps soldier killed in February 2012 while serving in Afghanistan.

=== Public transportation ===
The Silver Lake station provides service to Newark Penn Station on the Newark Light Rail.

Until 1966, the Newark Branch of the Erie-Lackawanna Railroad provided train service at stations at Belleville and Cleveland Street. The New York and Greenwood Lake Railway, later the Boonton Line, also served the township. The Newark Branch tracks are now used for freight only, operated by Norfolk Southern.

NJ Transit bus service is available to and from Newark on the 13, 27, 72, 74, 90, 92, 93 and 94 bus lines.

== Places of interest ==
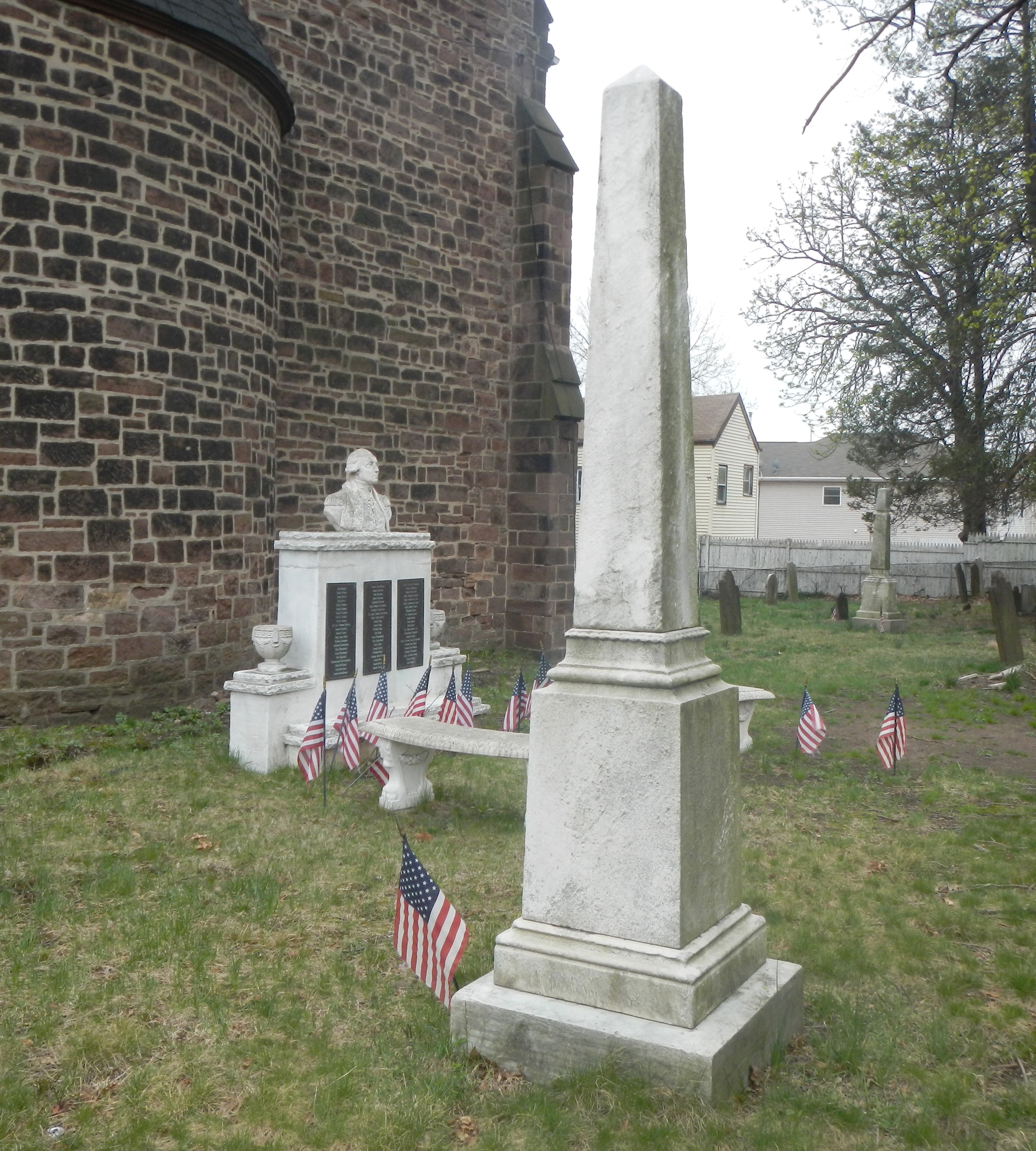
Military monument, Second River Dutch Church

- Clara Maass Medical Center is a 469-bed teaching hospital that is part of the Barnabas Health system, founded in 1868 as Newark German Hospital, and named for Clara Maass, a nurse who died after volunteering for medical experiments to study yellow fever
- Reformed Dutch Church of Second River – The church's original building was constructed in 1697 and replaced in 1725. A new structure was erected in 1807 after a tornado destroyed the previous church building, and the current church dates to 1853. More than 60 Continental Army soldiers are buried in the cemetery that adjoins the church.
- Christ Church Cemetery & Mausoleum – This cemetery was originally the first Episcopal Church in the area, established in 1746 by a land grant signed by King George II. The original burial ground still exists today, accompanied by a newer mausoleum.

=== Belleville locations in The Sopranos ===
- Episode 3 ("Denial, Anger, Acceptance"): Christopher Moltisanti's "mock execution" is on the pier in the Passaic River used by Belleville High School's crew team.
- Episode 28 ("Proshai, Livushka"): Livia Soprano's funeral is held at the Irvine-Cozzarelli Memorial Home, across the street from Belleville Middle School on Washington Avenue.
- Season 4- Even though Furio Giunta's house was stated to be in Nutley, its actual location was Belleville on Essex Street.
- Episode 55 ("Where's Johnny?"): Junior gets lost and tells the policemen who find him that he lives in Belleville.
- Episode 76 ("Cold Stones"): Rosalie Aprile briefly dates a much younger French motorcyclist named Michel, who hails from Belleville, Paris. Ro expresses a particular sense of kinship with Michel given his connection to a town with the same name as the New Jersey town where members of her inner circle live (e.g., Corrado Soprano) and do business (e.g., the Irvine-Cozzarelli Memorial Home).

=== 1996 Torch Relay ===
On June 18, 1996, the Olympic Torch Relay came through Belleville. The relay entered Belleville from Rutgers, made a left onto Washington Avenue, passing the Belleville Town Hall, a right onto Belleville Avenue and stayed on Belleville into the township of Bloomfield. The torch relay ended at Atlanta, Georgia for the 1996 Summer Olympics.

== Notable people ==
People who were born in, residents of, or otherwise closely associated with Belleville include:

- Platt Adams (1885–1961), track and field athlete who was winner of gold and silver Olympic medals
- Russell Baker (1925–2019), Pulitzer Prize-winning writer of Growing Up
- Chico Borja (1959–2021), former professional soccer player
- Ramiro Borja (born 1961), retired professional soccer player
- Lonnie G. Bunch III (born 1952), museum director and historian
- Gilbert Luis R. Centina III (born 1947), Roman Catholic priest and author
- Ralph R. Caputo (born 1940), member of the New Jersey General Assembly who has represented the 28th Legislative District
- Kacy Catanzaro (born 1990) is a gymnast noted for being the first woman to qualify for the finals of the television sports challenge American Ninja Warrior
- Samuel Cornish (1795–1858), abolitionist and publisher of the first newspaper in the United States owned by African Americans
- Bob Crewe (1930–2014), songwriter, dancer, singer, manager, record producer and fine artist best known for producing, and co-writing together with Bob Gaudio, a string of Top 10 singles for The Four Seasons
- Jack Cullen (born 1939), pitcher who played for the New York Yankees
- Robert Curvin (1934–2015), researcher and theorist on issues related to urban poverty
- Michael Devaney (1891–1967), track and field athlete who competed in the 1920 Summer Olympics and in the 1924 Summer Olympics, and was part of the team that won the gold medal in 1920 in the 3000 meter steeplechase competition
- Tommy DeVito (1928–2020), musician and singer
- Dennis Diken (born 1957), drummer with The Smithereens
- Crystal Dickinson, actress who made her Broadway debut in the play Clybourne Park
- Cornelius Ennis (1813–1899), cotton shipper and railroad executive who served as Mayor of Houston, Texas
- Connie Francis (1938-2025), singer
- Dany Garcia (born 1969), businessperson, professional bodybuilder and film/television producer
- Bob Gaudio (born 1942), singer, songwriter and producer
- Kay Gardella (1923–2005), reporter, critic and columnist for almost 60 years at the New York Daily News
- Frances Goodrich (1890–1984), dramatist and screenwriter, best known for her collaborations with her partner and husband Albert Hackett
- Scott Graham (born 1965), Philadelphia Phillies broadcaster
- David Grant (born 1965), former NFL player
- Phil Grippaldi (born 1946) was an Olympic weightlifter who competed for the United States at the games in 1968, 1972 and 1976
- Creighton Gubanich (born 1972), catcher who played professionally in 15 games for the Boston Red Sox in 1999 and had a grand slam as his first career hit and only career home run

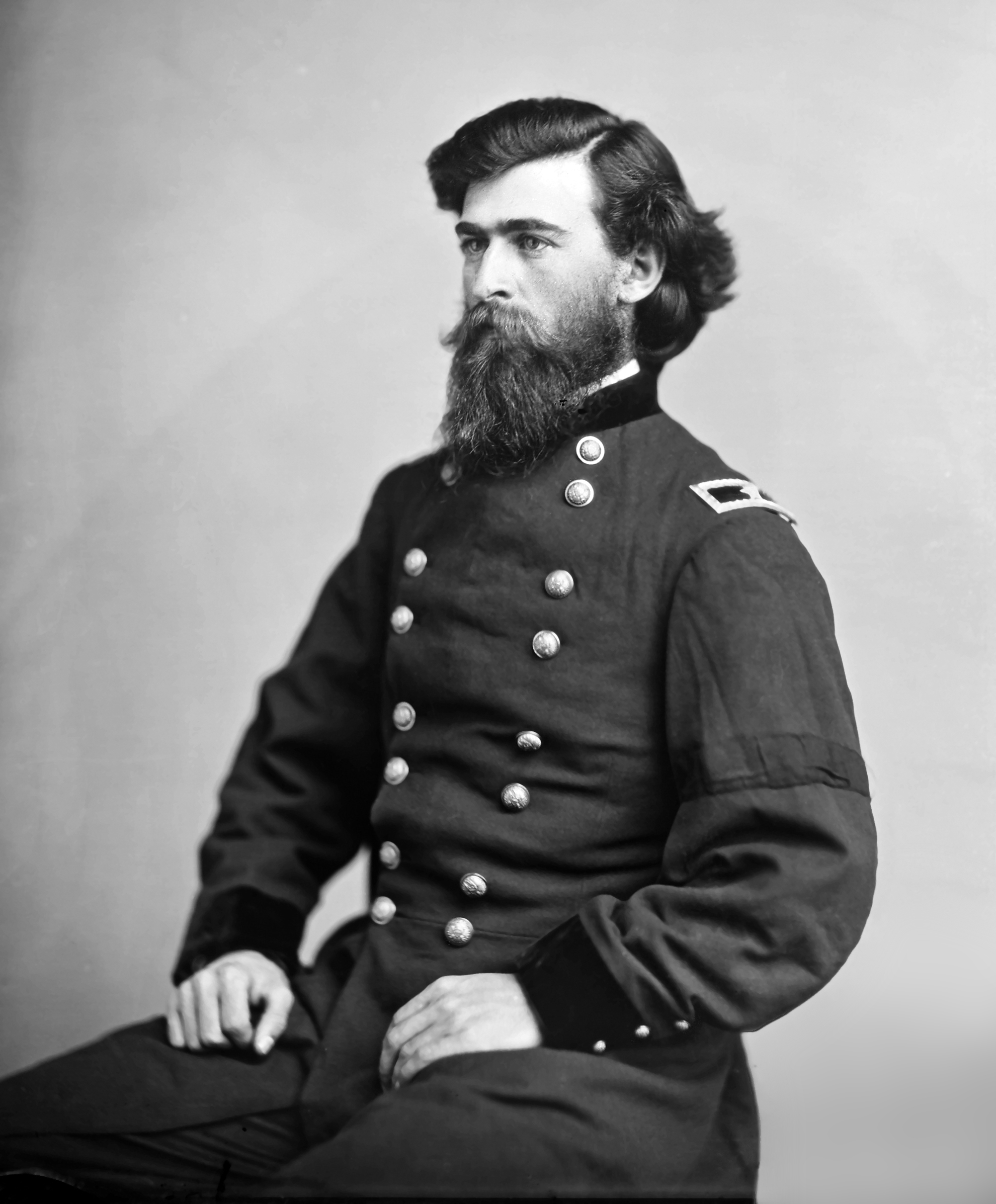
Gen. Llewellyn F. Haskell

- Llewellyn F. Haskell (1842–1929), United States Army officer and a Union general during the American Civil War
- George Hrab (born 1971), drummer, guitarist, composer and podcaster known for performing rock, funk and jazz
- Frank Iero (born 1981), musician best known as the rhythm guitarist for the band My Chemical Romance, lead vocalist for the band Leathermouth and lead vocalist and guitarist for the band Pencey Prep
- Nick Massi (1935–2000), early member of the Four Seasons
- Tony Meola (born 1969), soccer goalie
- Paul Mirabella (born 1954), MLB player for the Texas Rangers, New York Yankees, Toronto Blue Jays, Baltimore Orioles, Seattle Mariners, and the Milwaukee Brewers
- Doris Kopsky Muller (1922–1997), cyclist who was the first woman to win a national title in cycling
- Fred Paul Partus (born 1943), inventor and engineer known for his contributions to the development of optical fiber manufacturing and rocket engine diagnostics
- Joe Pesci (born 1943), actor
- J. H. Pitman (1896–1958), scholar of English literature, who was noted for his verse translations of medieval texts
- Daniel H. Rucker (1812–1910), U.S. Army brigadier general
- Diane Ruggiero, That's Life series creator and Veronica Mars writer
- Roxana Saberi (born 1977), Iranian-American journalist arrested in Iran in February 2009
- Ron San Fillipo (1942–2024), athletic director and athletics coach
- Junior Sanchez (born 1977), DJ, record producer and remixer
- Peggy Santiglia (born 1944), singer, songwriter and lead singer The Angels
- Fred Schneider (born 1951), singer, songwriter, arranger and musician, best known as the frontman of the rock band the B-52's, of which he is a founding member
- Andrew E. Svenson (1910–1975), children's author, publisher, and partner in the Stratemeyer Syndicate, who authored or coauthored more than 70 books for children, including books in the Hardy Boys and Bobbsey Twins series
- Frankie Valli (born 1934), lead singer of the musical group The Four Seasons
- Sharon Van Etten (born 1981), singer-songwriter
- James Wallwork (1930–2024), Republican Party politician who served in both houses of the New Jersey Legislature
- Gerard Way (born 1977), musician, singer-songwriter, and comic book writer best known as the lead singer of the band My Chemical Romance and writer of the comic series The Umbrella Academy
- Mikey Way (born 1980), musician best known as the bassist for the band My Chemical Romance
- Gus Wickie (1885–1947), German-born American bass singer, stage actor and voice of Bluto in the Fleischer Studios' Popeye cartoons from 1935 until 1938
- Leonard R. Willette (1921–1944), Tuskegee Airman pilot killed in action in World War II flying over Germany while protecting a group of American bombers
