= Pavilion and Colonnade Apartments =

Buildings in Newark, New Jersey, U.S.

Pavilion Apartments
- Interactive map of the Pavilion Apartments area

General information
- Type: 3 High rise apartment buildings
- Location: 108-136 Martin Luther King Junior Blvd, Newark, NJ
- Coordinates: 40°45′02″N 74°10′47″W
- Construction started: 1958
- Opening: 1960

Height
- Roof: 61.27 m (201.0 ft)

Technical details
- Floor count: 22
- Floor area: ~14,124 sq ft (1,312.2 m^{2}) (214 by 66 ft or 65 by 20 m)
- Lifts/elevators: 3 (each)

Design and construction
- Architect: Mies van der Rohe
- Developer: Herbert Greenwald

Other information
- Number of units: 340 (each)

Website
- rentpavilion.com

Colonnade Apartments
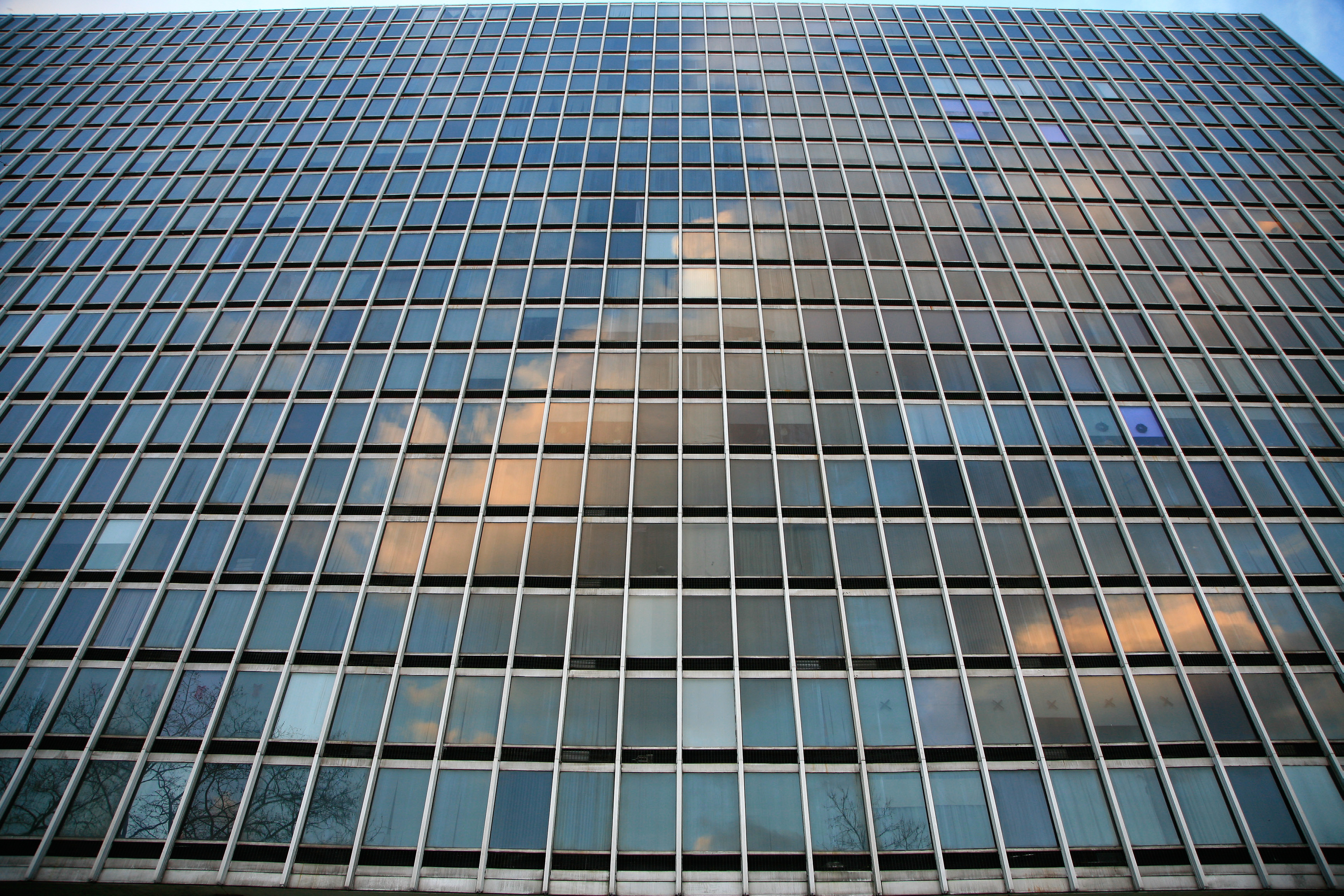
- Colonnade Facade
- Interactive map of the Colonnade Apartments area

General information
- Type: High rise apartment
- Location: 25-51 Clifton Avenue, Newark, New Jersey
- Coordinates: 40°45′02″N 74°10′47″W
- Construction started: 1958
- Opening: 1960

Height
- Roof: 59.13 m (194.0 ft)

Technical details
- Floor count: 21
- Floor area: ~29,436 square feet (446 feet by 66 feet)
- Lifts/elevators: 6

Design and construction
- Architect: Mies van der Rohe
- Developer: Herbert Greenwald

Other information
- Number of units: 560

The Pavilion and Colonnade Apartments are three highrise apartment buildings in Newark, New Jersey. The Pavilion Apartments are located at 108-136 Martin Luther King Junior Blvd. and the Colonnade Apartments at 25-51 Clifton Avenue in the overlapping neighborhoods known as Seventh Avenue and Lower Broadway.

The 22-story towers were designed in the International Style by architect Ludwig Mies van der Rohe and opened in 1960, originally known as Colonnade Park. The towers are built in the modernist style of "towers in the park," which advocated dense high-rise housing complexes set within parks and open spaces (which has since fallen out of fashion in favor of mixed-use and low-rise development). Soon after completing Manhattan's Seagram Building, Mies designed the three towers near Branch Brook Park, north of Downtown Newark and adjacent University Heights and Interstate 280.

Privately owned, the buildings were intended to bring middle-income families to the area of the Christopher Columbus Homes — a cluster of low-income apartment buildings, or public housing projects, which were eventually demolished. The Pavilion Apartments were sold in April 2018.

== Historical significance ==
The Pavilion and Colonnade Apartments possess exceptional importance in the 20th century social history of Newark, urban planning and development, and Modernist architecture. The district has the distinction of being New Jersey's first urban renewal project and one of the first in the nation. Through an effort of over 10 years, involving planning, court cases, State and Federal legislation, and a number of developers, the Colonnade Park came to fruition in 1960. The immediate surrounding area has New Jersey's highest concentration of historic landmarks, including Plume House (c.1725), State Street Public School (c.1845), House of Prayer (c.1850), Branch Brook Park (c.1895), Cathedral Basilica of the Sacred Heart (c.1898-1954), Newark Broad Street Station (c.1903), and St. Lucy's Church (c.1926), all of which are listed in the National Register of Historic Places.

One of the 20th century's most influential architects, Mies van der Rohe, collaborated with the legendary developer Herbert Greenwald to these towers in Newark among other projects, such as the 860–880 Lake Shore Drive Apartments in Chicago, the Seagram Building in New York City, and Lafayette Park, Detroit. Upon Greenwald's death in a 1959 air crash, Colonnade Park became their last collaboration and Mies’ only residential project in the eastern United States.

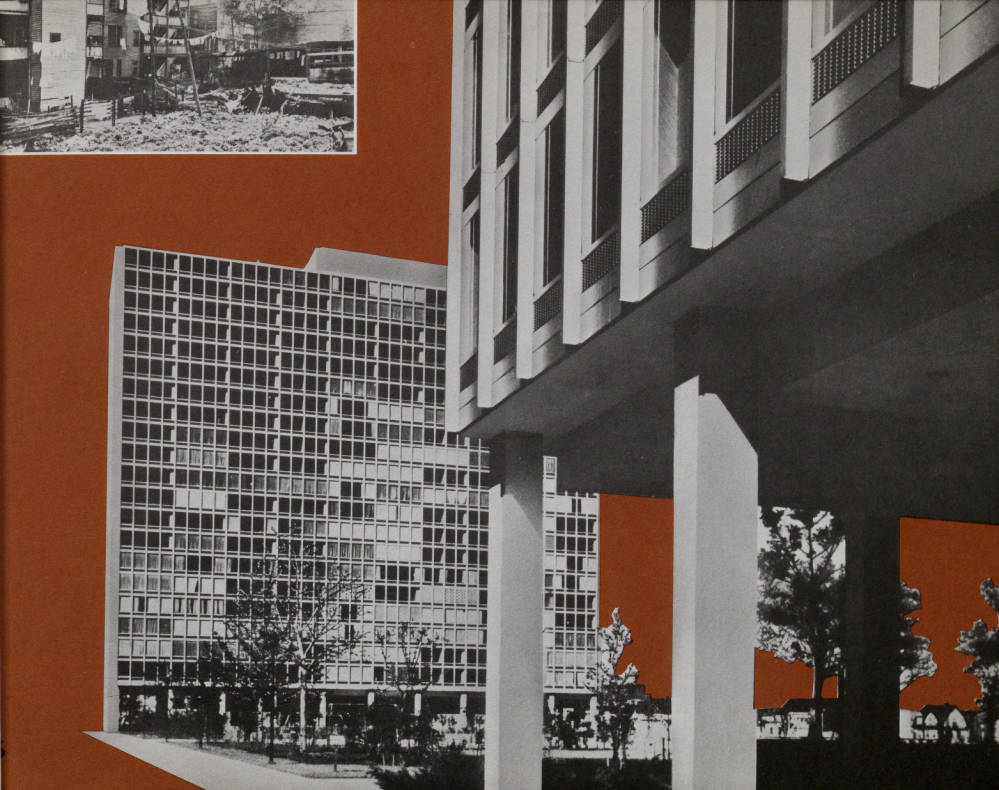
The Pavilion in 1962

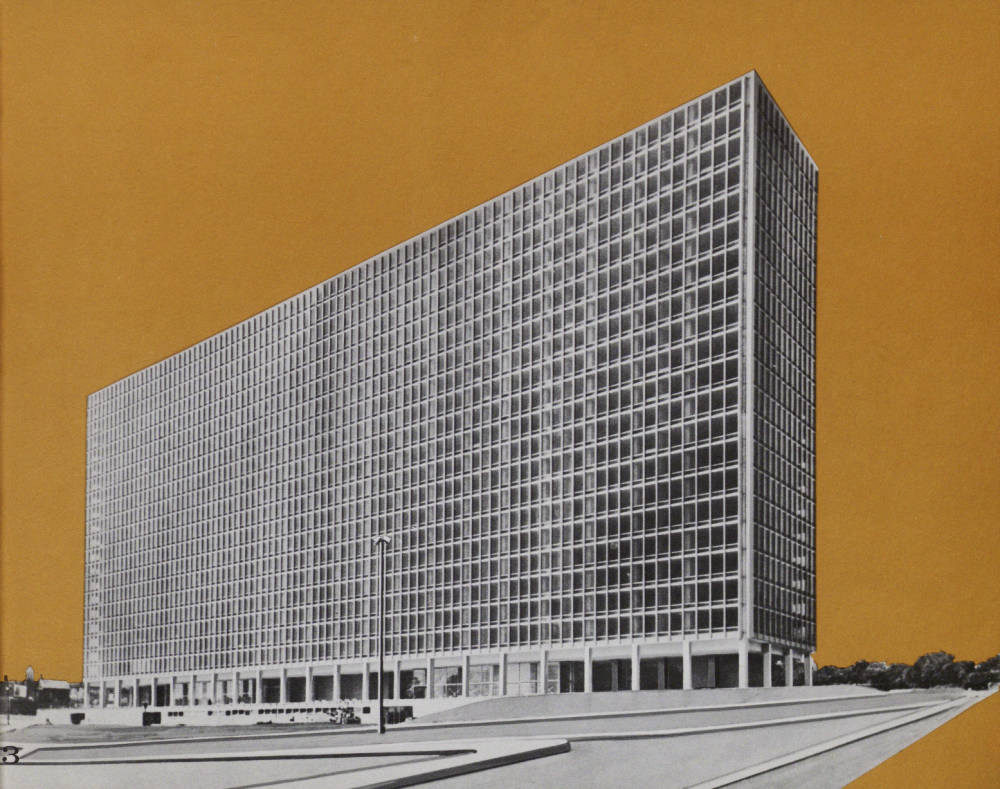
The Colonnade in 1962
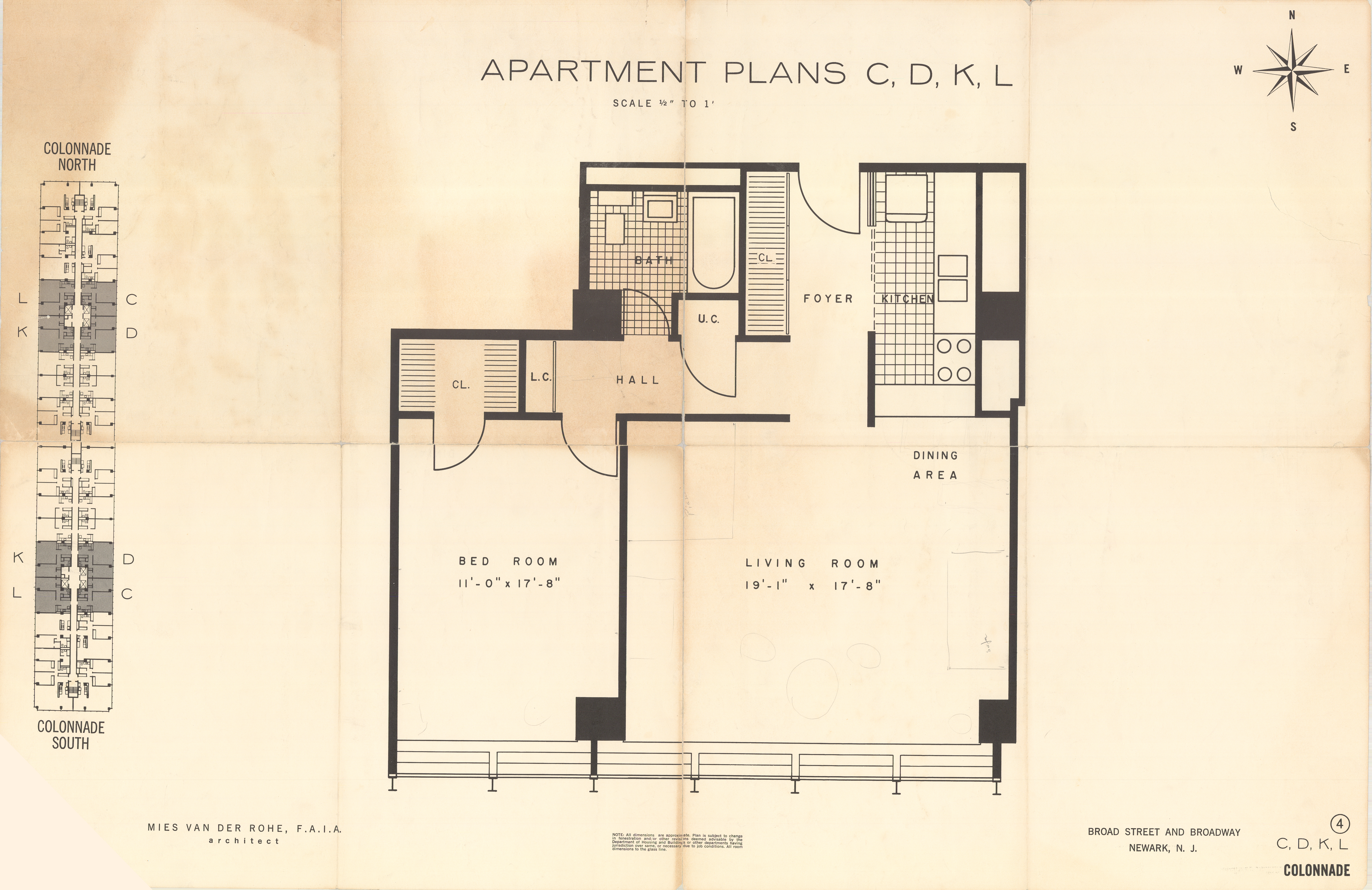
Newark Colonnade - plan of typical floor

== Buildings description ==
The Colonnade Park consists of three International Style residential towers designed by Ludwig Mies van der Rohe and completed in 1960. They are located immediately adjacent to the northern edge of Newark's Central Business District, north of Interstate 280, east of Clifton Avenue, south of Seventh Avenue, and west of the intersection of Broad Street and Broadway. Conceived as “a city within a city,” the twin buildings known as the Pavilion Apartments are next to the city's Broad Street thoroughfare, and the large “double-length” building known as the Colonnade Apartments faces the majestic Branch Brook Park. The three 22-story aluminum-clad glass high-rises offer 1,240 apartments on a 23.5-acre site. The immediate surrounding area has New Jersey's highest concentration of historic landmarks. It is the only residential work ever constructed in the eastern states that was personally designed by Mies van der Rohe. As such, Mies' Newark project is in many ways aesthetically similar to the Seagram Building, with similar window proportions, exposed beams, columned ground floor, and elevator lobby.

Mies’ Colonnade Apartments, with its reflective glass skin, majestically stands above the treetops of Frederick Law Olmsted's Branch Brook Park in the west. Downhill toward the east, 1,500 feet away, the two Pavilion Apartments are perpendicularly oriented, but face each other with 500 feet apart. The narrower sides of the two rectangular structures are positioned next to Broad Street, Newark's historic artery since 1666. Looking back toward the west, the massive Colonnade Apartments commands a dramatic scene on the top of the elevation, with two Pavilion Apartments symmetrically spaced on its two sides. Now, without the eight Columbus Homes high rises in-between, Mies’ vision has become ever more pronounced in these three 22-story rental buildings. Upper-level floors command views of Downtown Newark and the Manhattan skyline.

A rectilinear prism, the Colonnade Apartments measures 446 feet by 66 feet and contains 560 apartments. (It is Mies’ most expansive structure.) Each bay of the building, that is the distance between two structural columns, measures 22 feet and contains four windows. Each of the two Pavilion Apartments towers is 214 feet by 66 feet with 340 apartments each (680 total). Each tower is a compact mass, symmetrical unto itself, framed by four corners that have a particular aesthetic earlier revealed at Mies' work for the Illinois Institute of Technology. The corners consist of two wide flanges at the center-lines and an eight-inch angle welded between - a feature shared with most of Mies' other towers. These towers were built with reinforced concrete columns to reduce costs, while a skin of glass and prefabricated aluminum moderated the buildings' internal temperature.

== Gallery ==
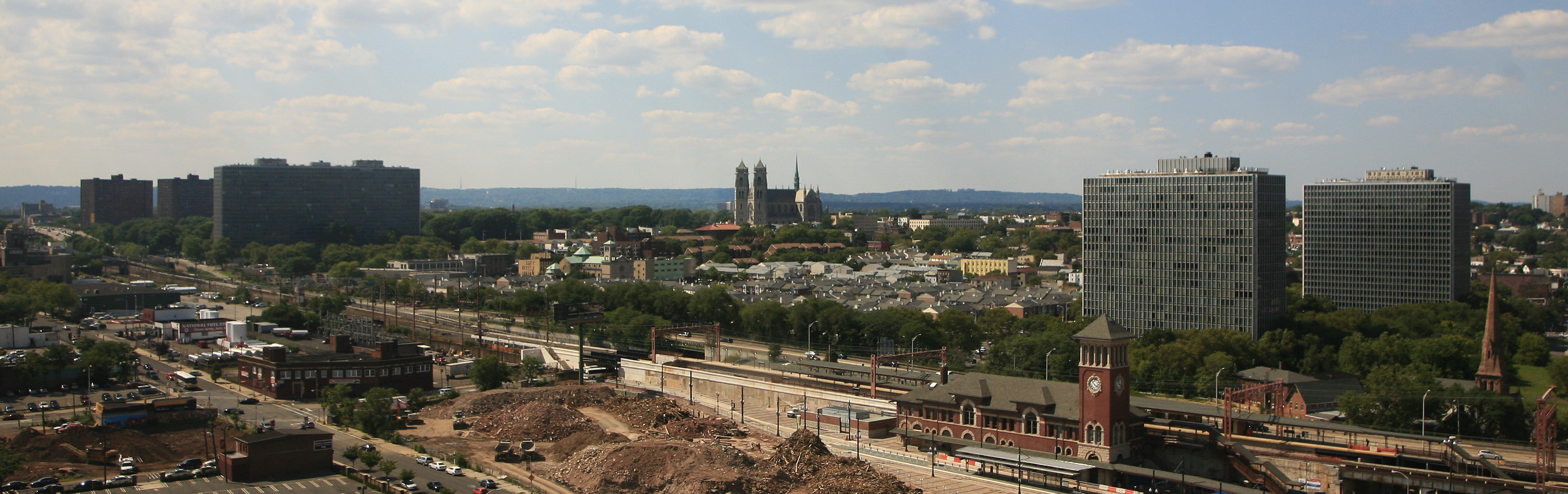
From left to right: Garden Spires Apartments (not related to Mies), Colonnade Apartments, Branch Brook Park, Cathedral Basilica of the Sacred Heart, Pavilion Apartments, Newark Broad Street Station, House of Prayer Episcopal Church and Rectory. Photo taken from One Washington Park office tower.

=== Pavilion ===
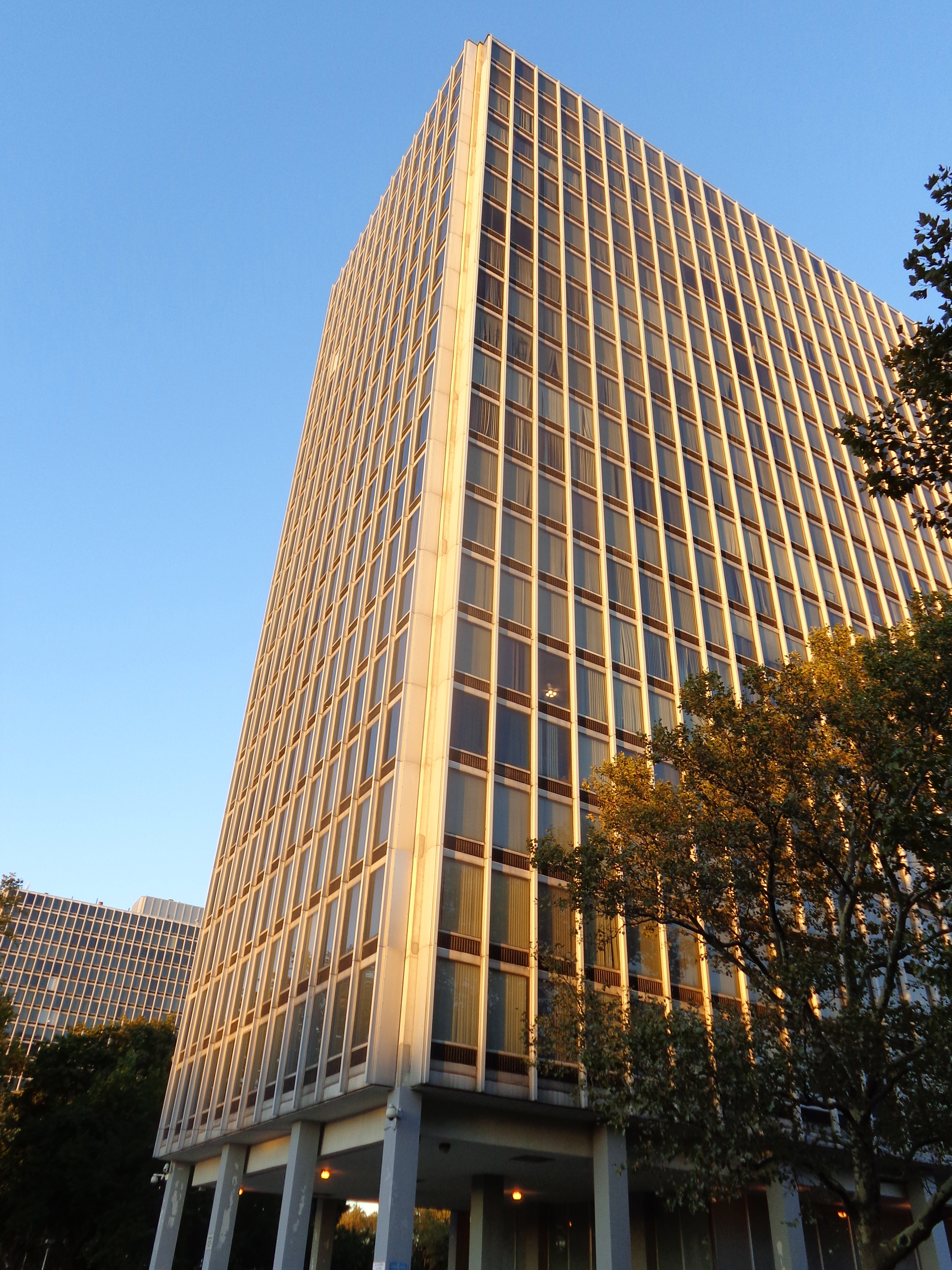
The Pavilion at Sunset

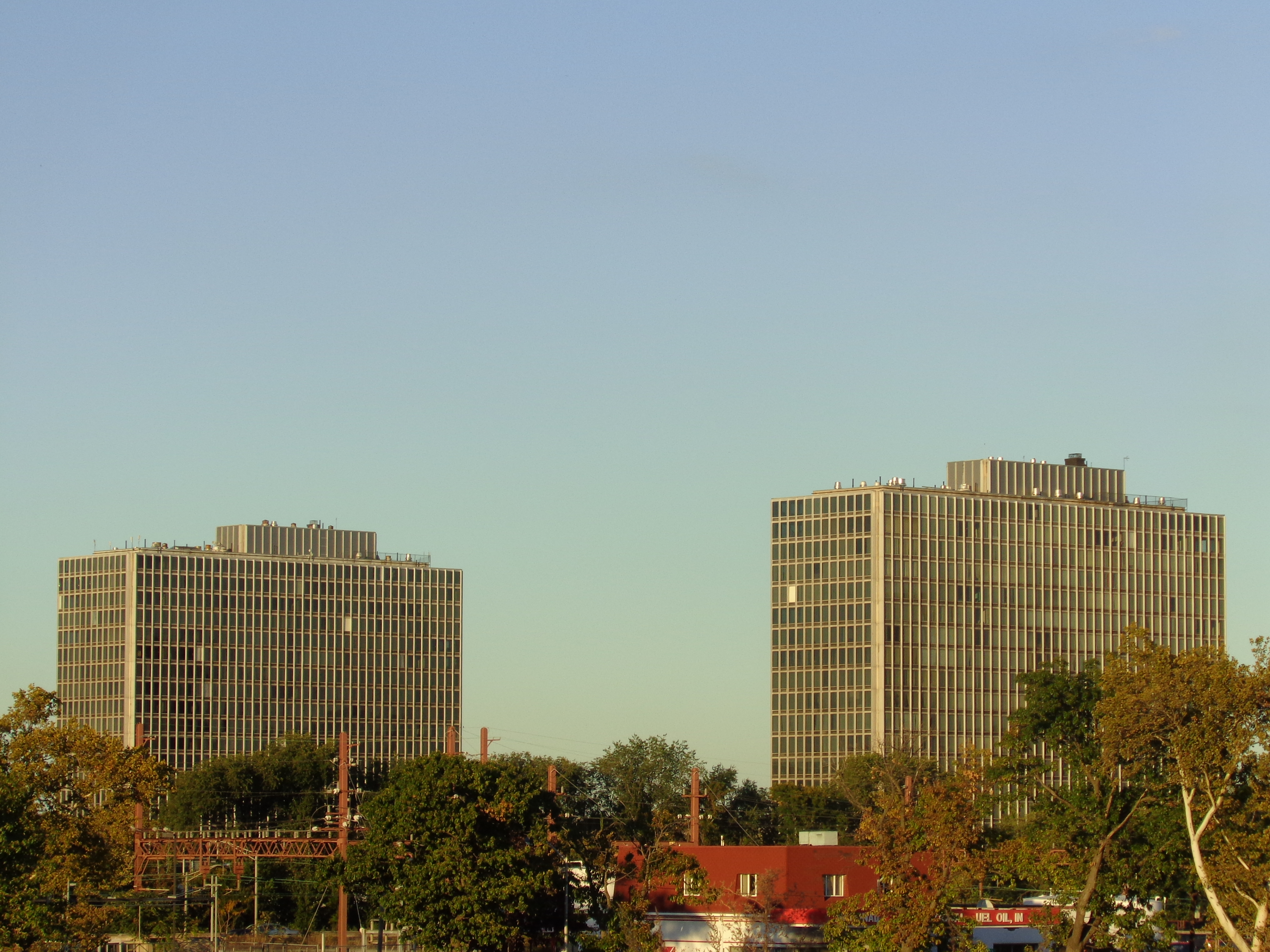
Pavilion from Downtown

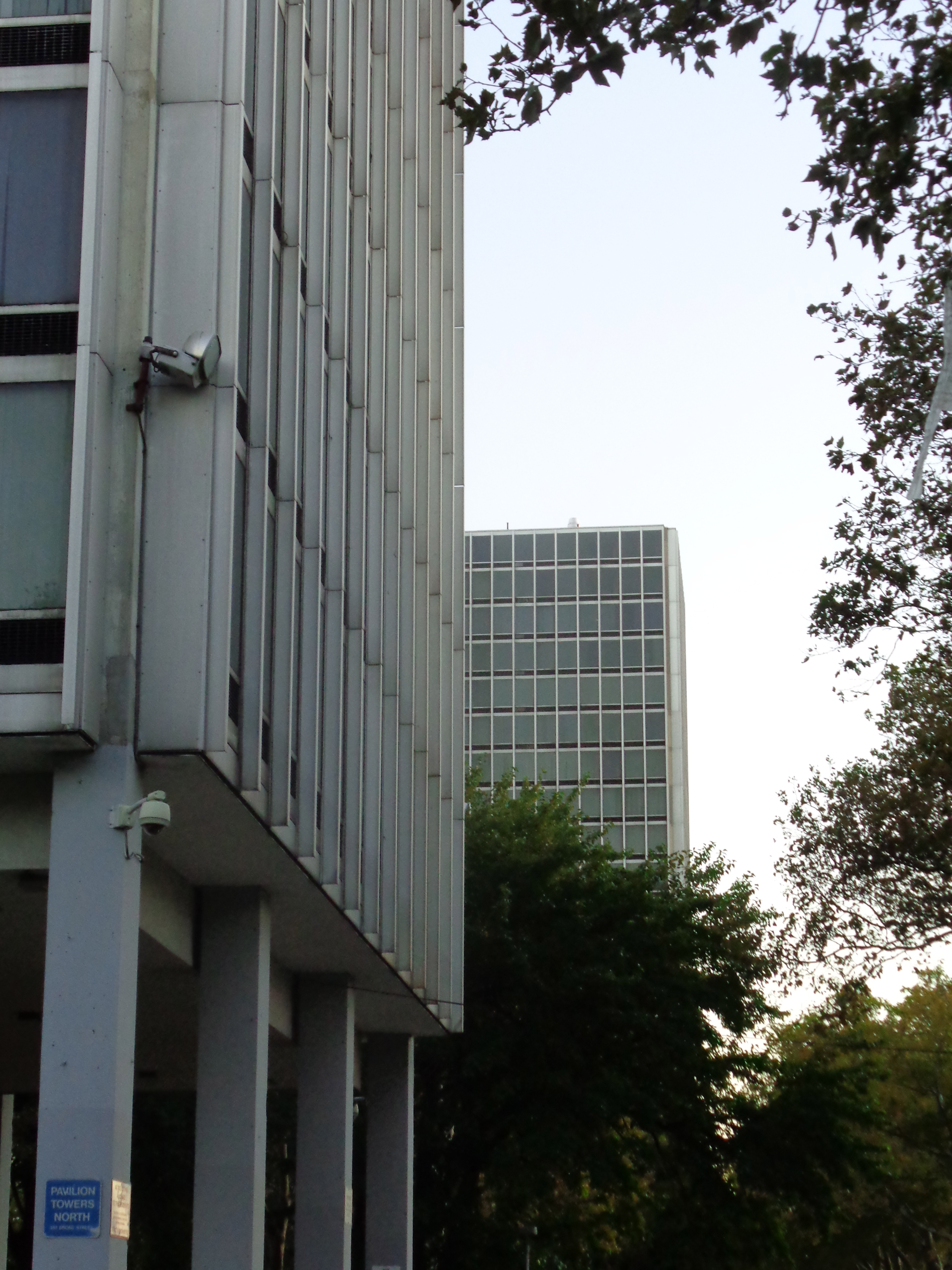
The Pavilion

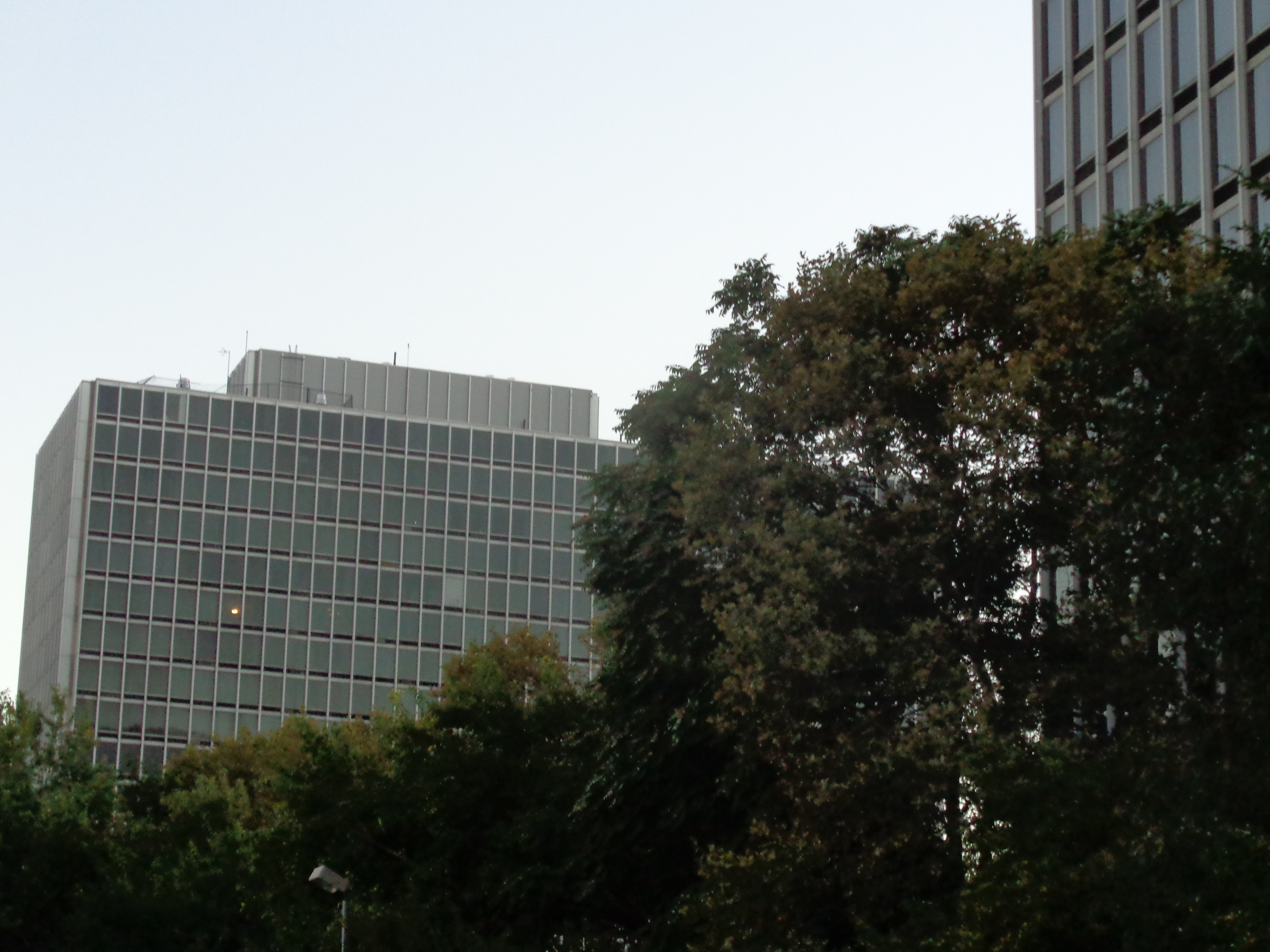
The Pavilion

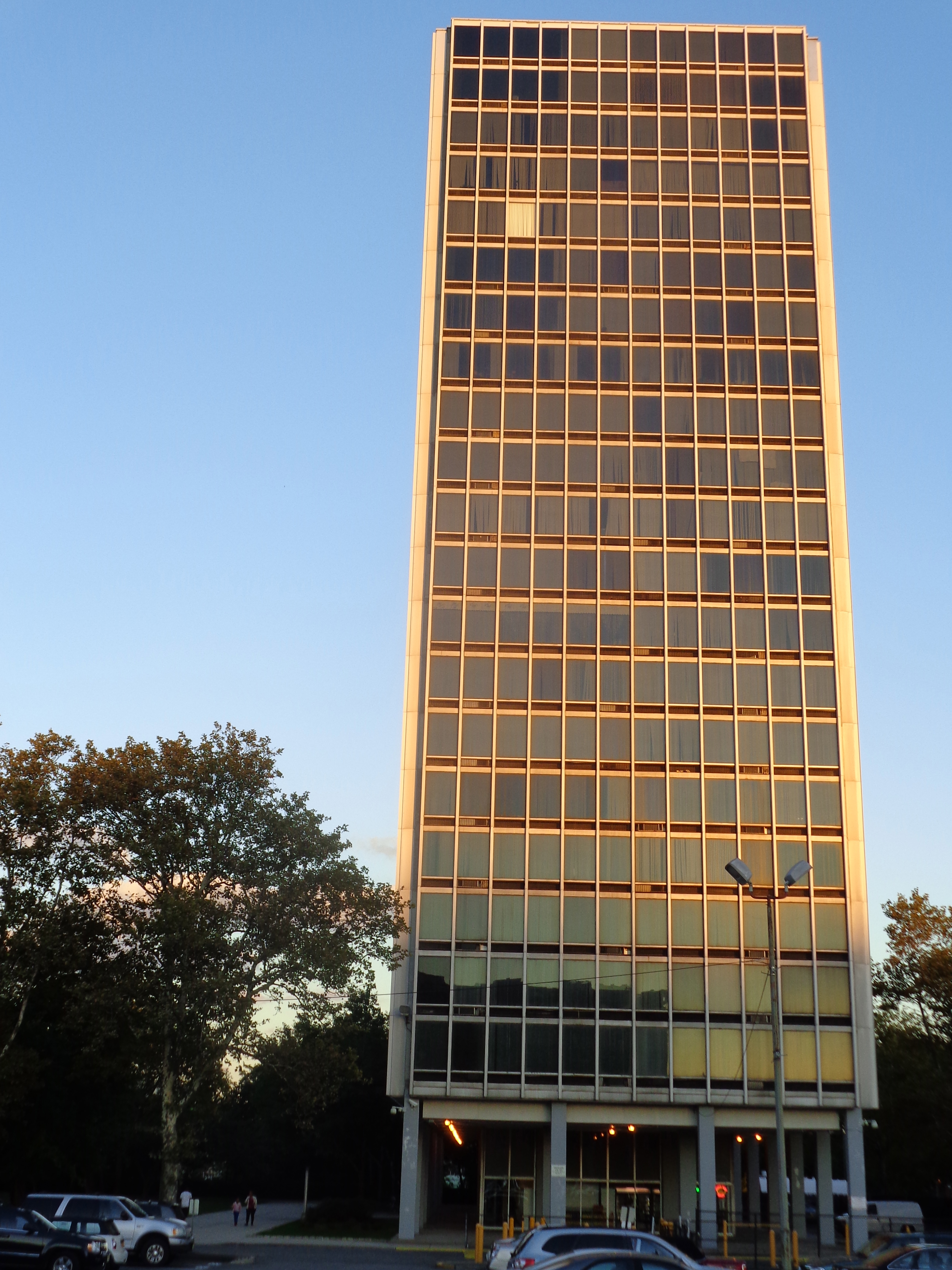
The Pavilion at Sunset

=== Colonnade ===
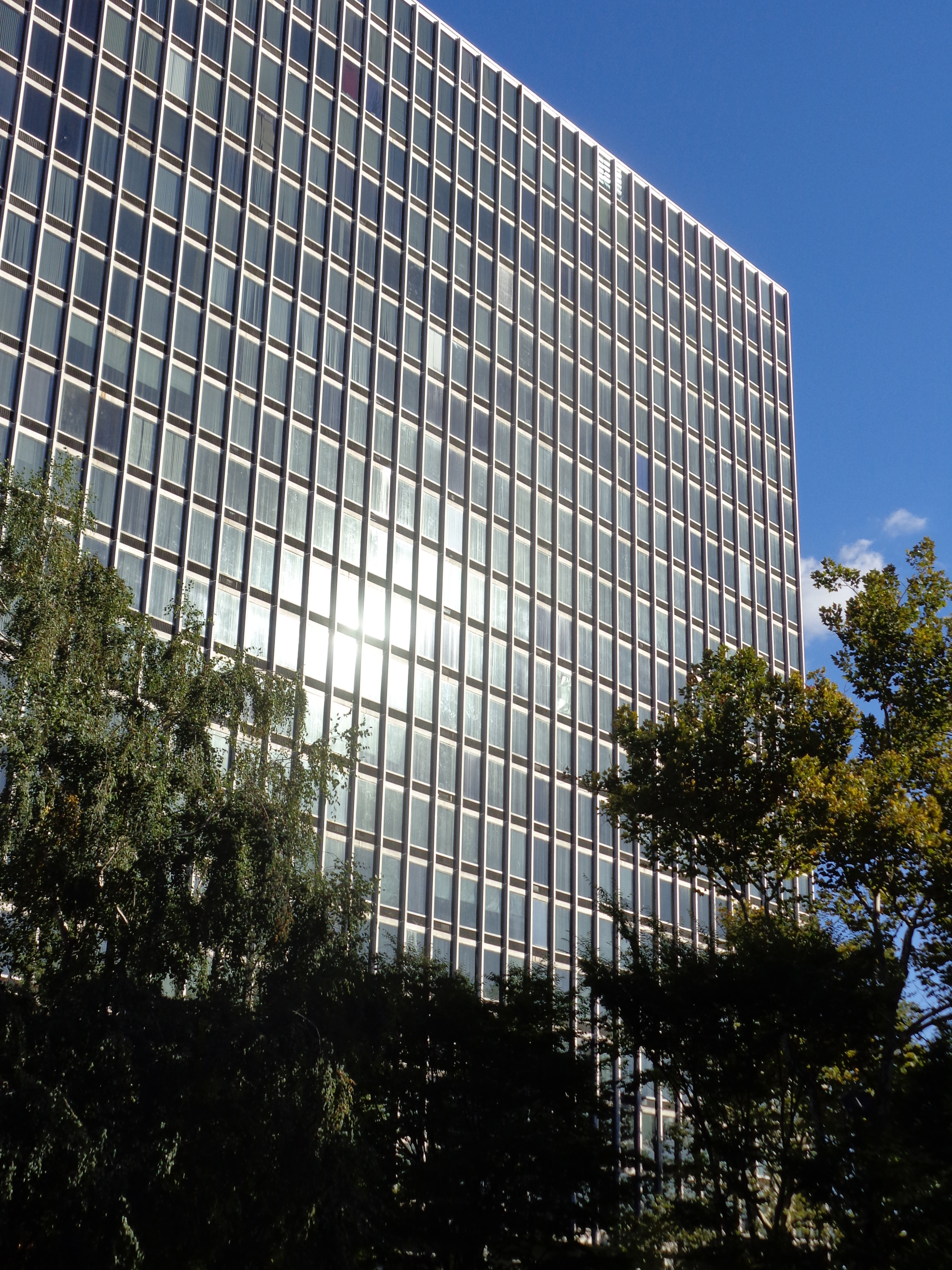
Colonnade from Branch Brook Park

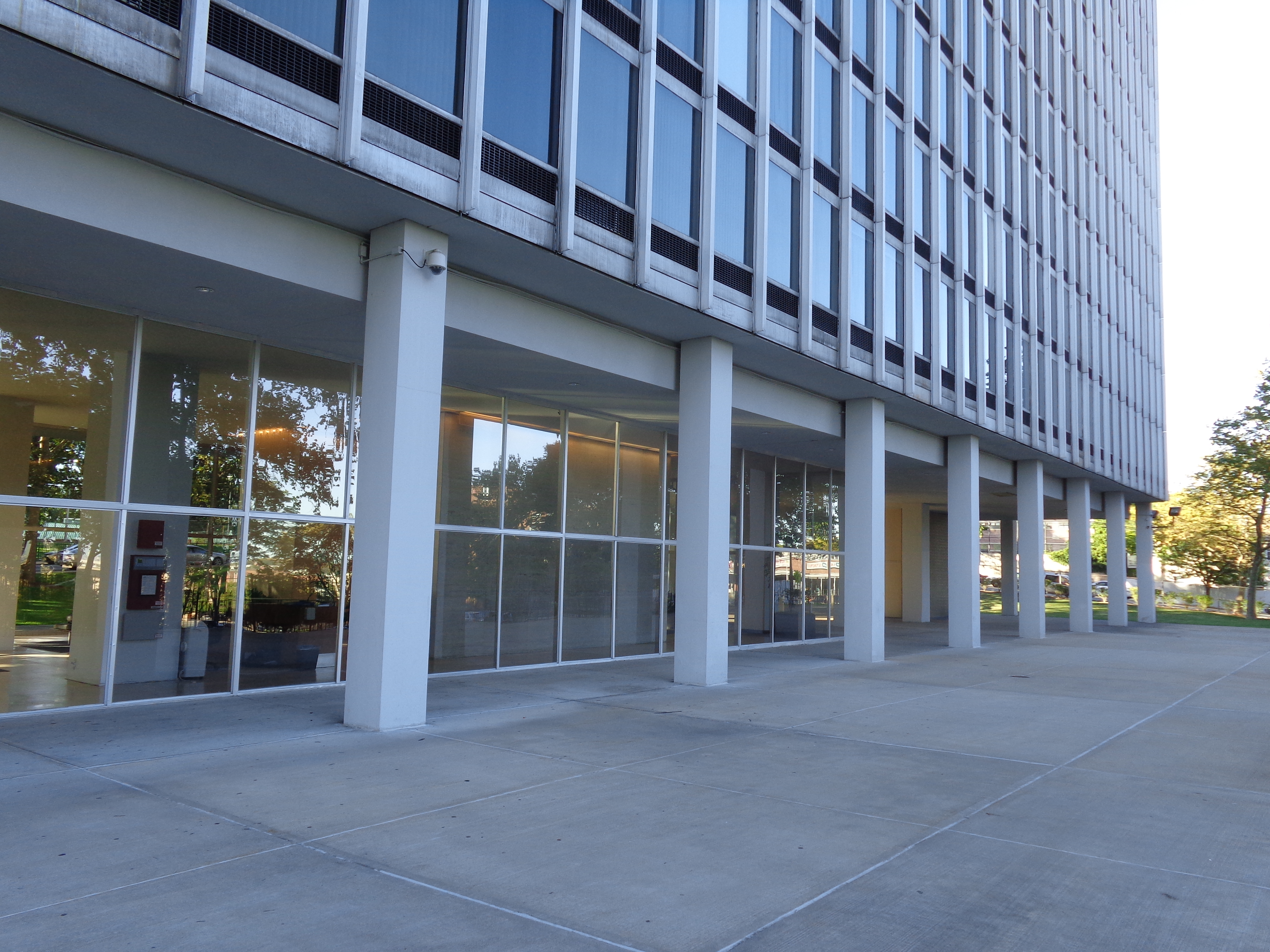
Colonnade Entrance

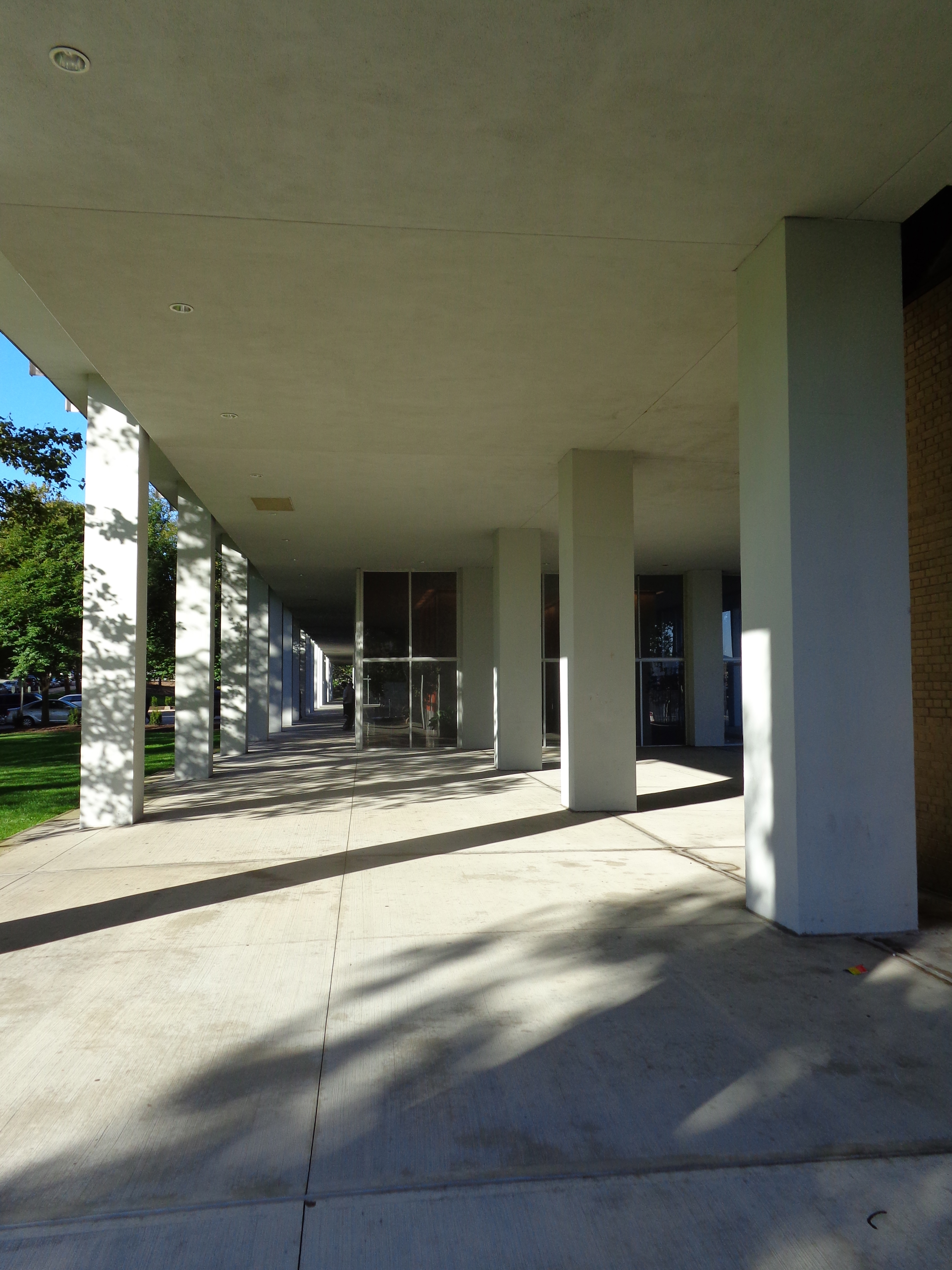
Colonnade Entrance

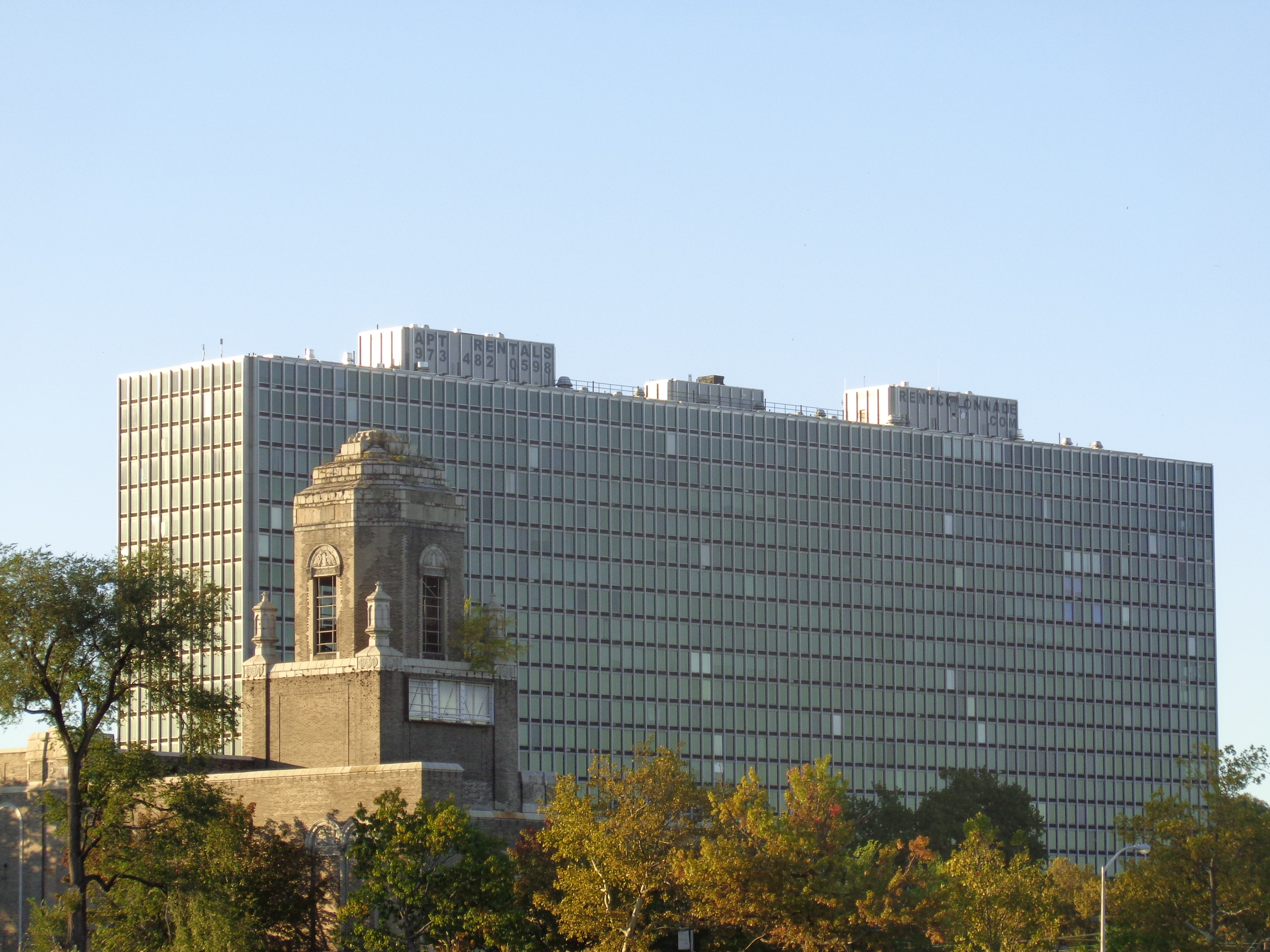
Colonnade from Downtown Newark

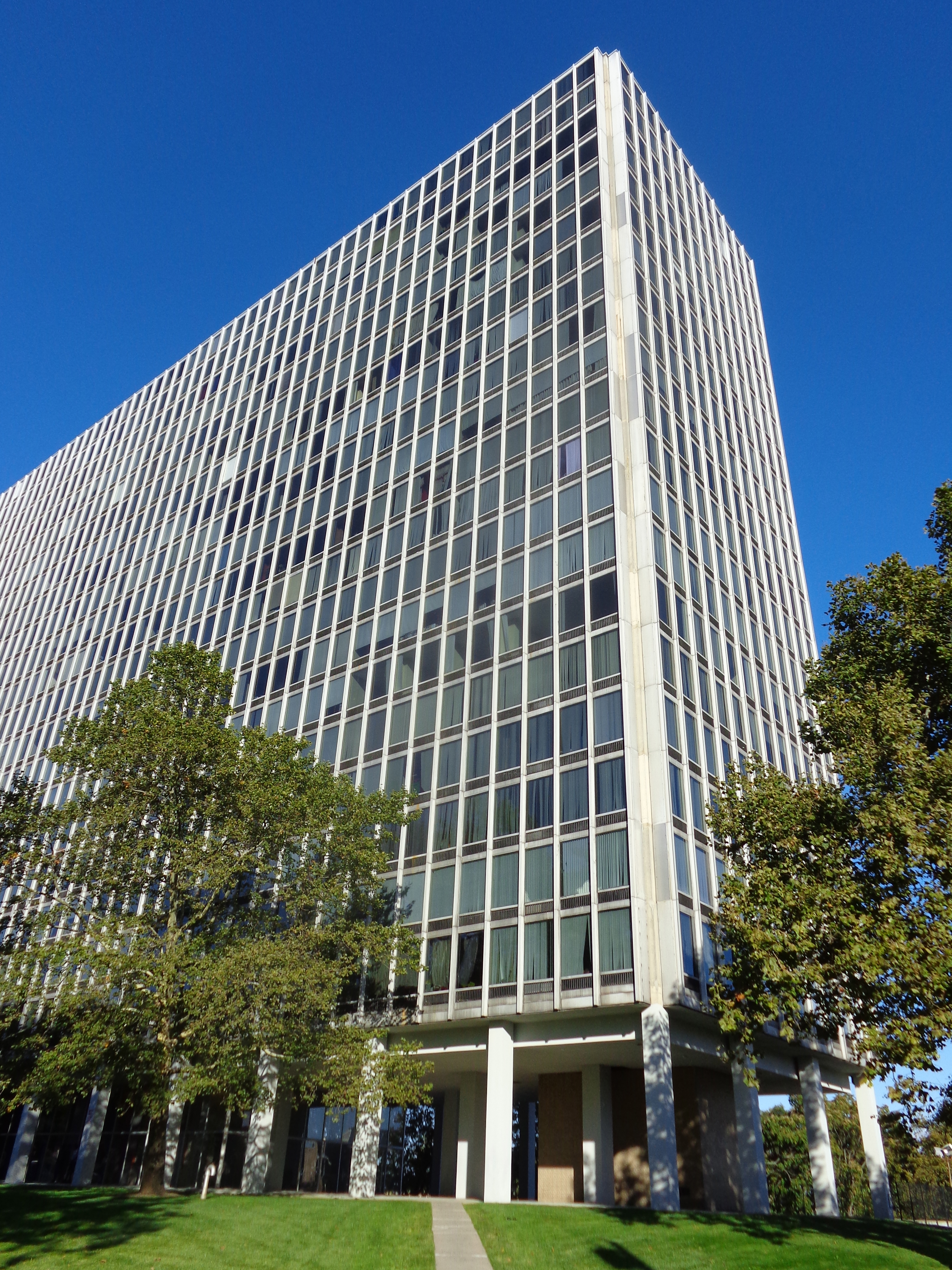
Colonnade

== See also ==
- Mies van der Rohe Residential District, Detroit
- Mies van der Rohe
- National Register of Historic Places listings in Essex County, New Jersey
- List of tallest buildings in Newark
