= Broadway, Newark =

Populated place in Essex County, New Jersey, US

Coordinates: 40°46′30″N 74°9′30″W

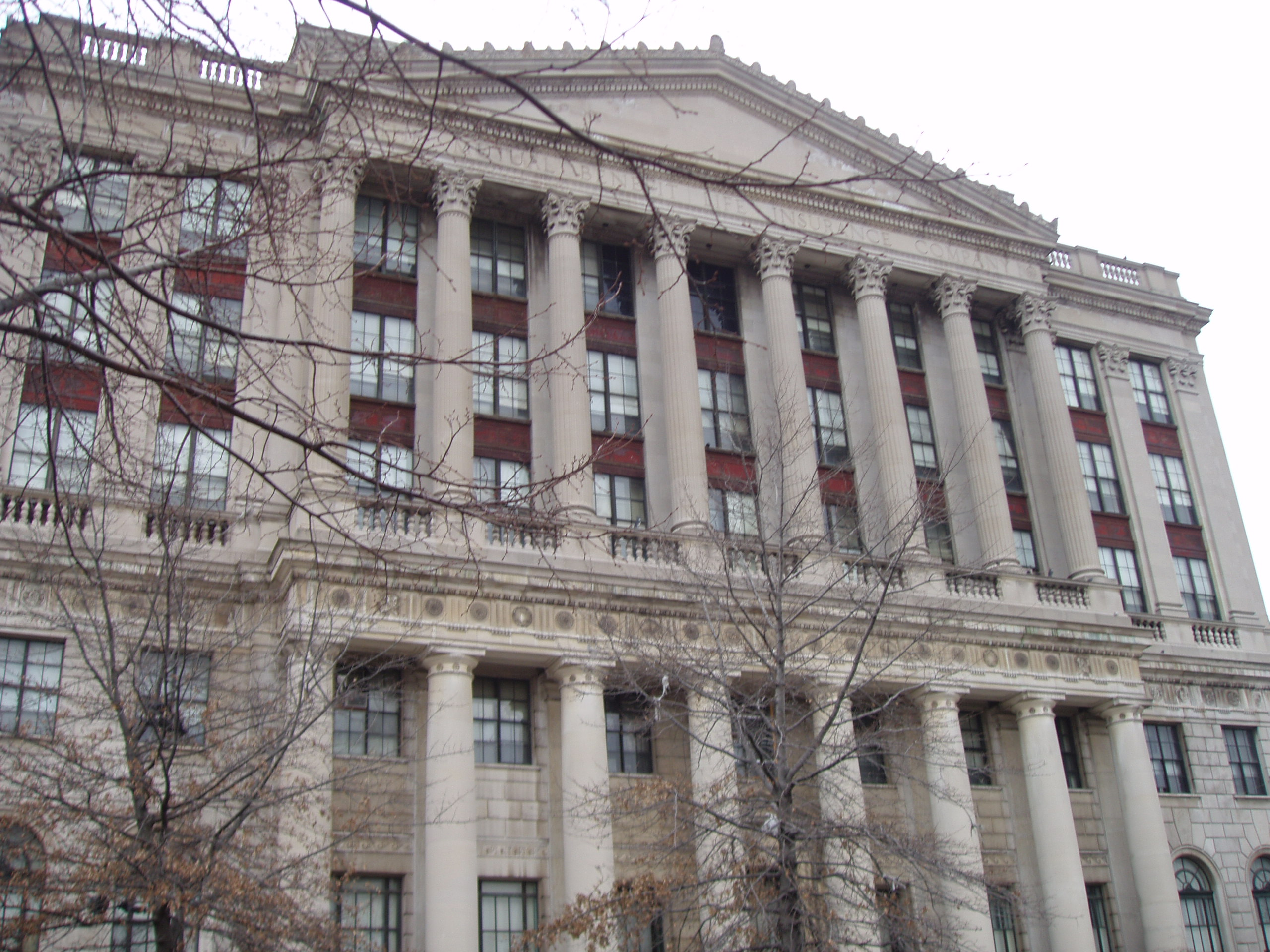
In the 1950s and 1960s, the Mutual Benefit building housed the Essex Catholic High School. Today it is the Broadway House nursing home.

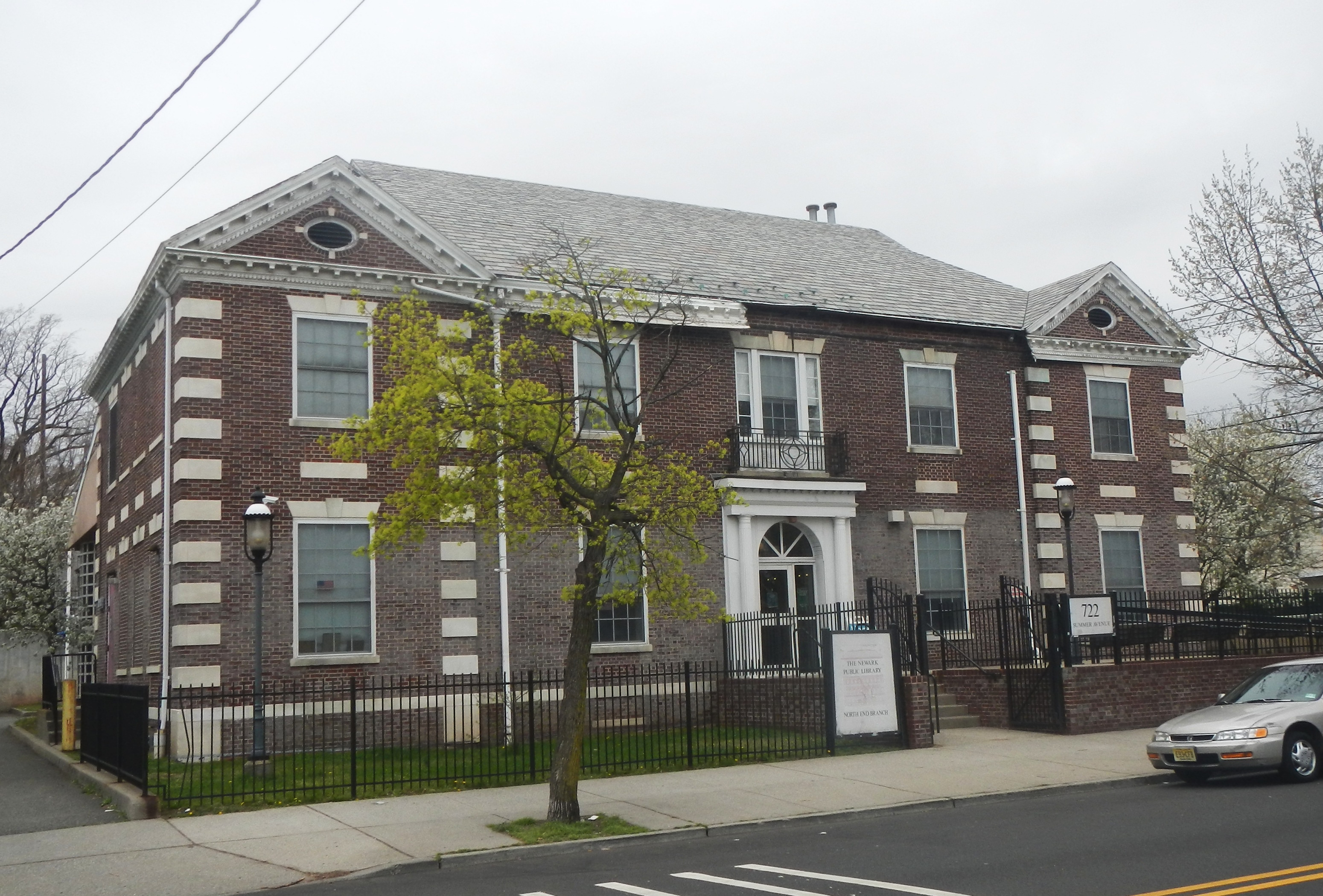
Newark Public Library North End Branch

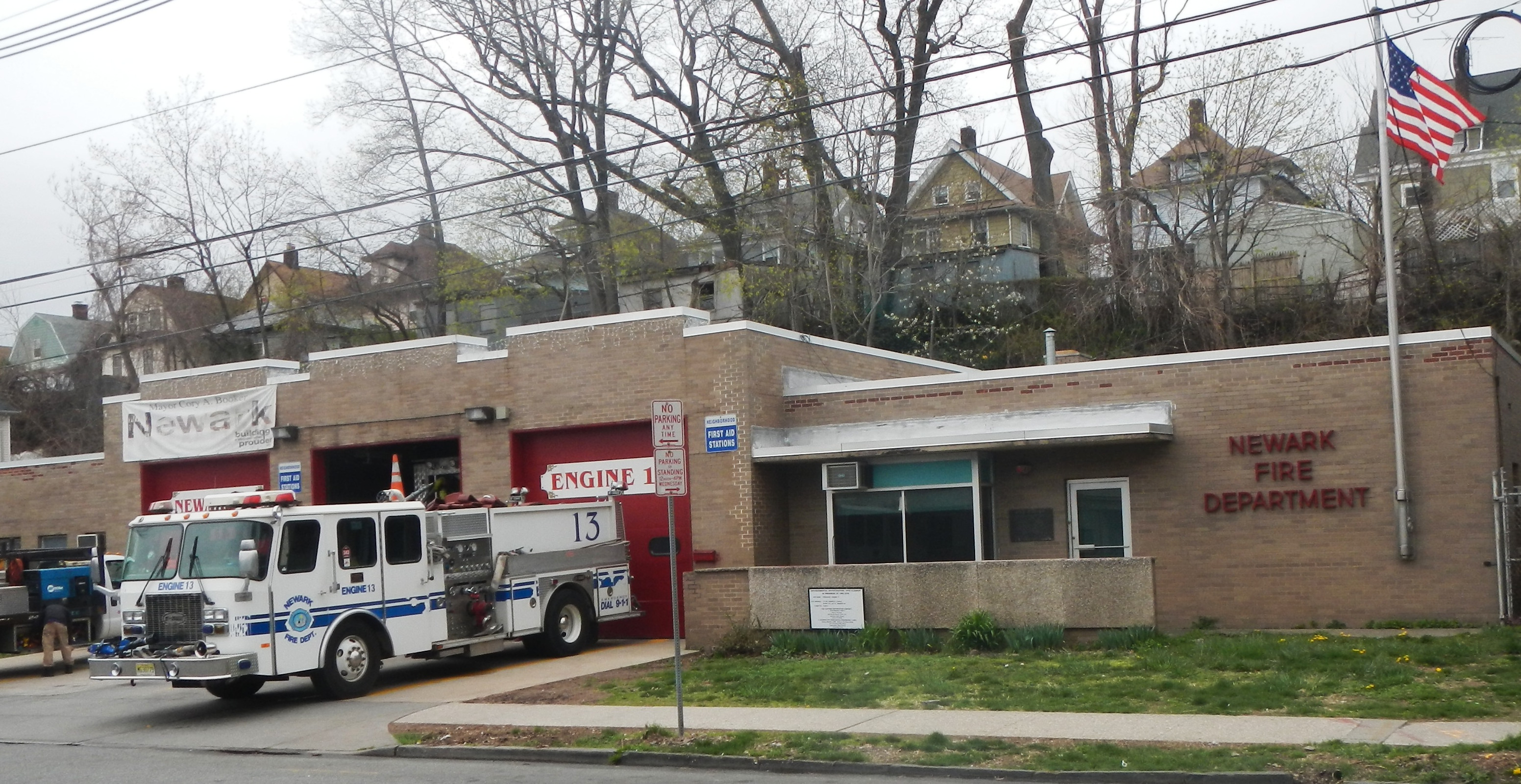
Engine Company 13, And Ladder Company 6 Firehouse

Broadway is a neighborhood within the city of Newark in Essex County, in the U.S. state of New Jersey. It is located on the west bank of the Passaic River, in Newark's North Ward, east of Forest Hill and north of Seventh Avenue. The neighborhood extends from Interstate 280 to Belleville. The term "Broadway" has only come into use recently, most Broadway residents simply refer to their area as part of the North Ward. The street itself "Broadway" was called "Washington Avenue" until the early twentieth century. Today, the area is predominantly Italian American, Puerto Rican and Dominican, with a growing population from other parts of Latin America. The New Jersey Historical Society was located here from the 1930s to 1997. The neo-classical Mutual Benefit building was constructed in the Broadway neighborhood in 1927. The district has many old brownstones in various states of repair. There are high-rise apartment buildings overlooking Branch Brook Park.

== North Broadway ==
North Broadway is the northern section of the Broadway neighborhood roughly bound by Mt. Prospect Avenue. North Broadway used to be made up of several neighborhoods including North Newark, Woodside and Riverside from north to south. Today these names are less frequently used. North Newark is bounded by McCarter Hwy, Tiffany Blvd, the Passaic River and Franklin Ave near the Belleville line. Woodside Station was a stop on Erie Lackawanna's Newark Branch. Located in the vicinity of what is now Grafton Ave near Oraton St. Passenger service was discontinued in '66 although freight is still hauled to service local industries in the area, operated by Norfolk Southern Railroad Corp. Woodside is bound by Summer Ave, Chester Avenue, Herbert Place and the Passaic River. Riverside Station, which today would be in the vicinity of Chester Ave & Riverside Ave, was a stop on the Erie Lackawanna Railroad's Newark Branch. Passenger service was discontinued in '66 but freight is still hauled on the branch to service several industries in the area, which today is operated by Norfolk Southern Railroad Corp. The North End branch of the Newark Public Library is located in the Woodside/North Broadway neighborhood on Summer Ave.

This part of Broadway was called Washington Avenue until property owners led by Franz Kaiser formed the Broadway Association to rename it and advocate for improvements on the thoroughfare.

== Mt. Pleasant ==
The central portion of Broadway is sometimes called Mount Pleasant. It is roughly bounded by Herbert Place, Arlington Avenue, Mt. Prospect Avenue, 4th Avenue and the Passaic River. This neighborhood is home to Mt. Pleasant Cemetery.

== South Broadway ==
South Broadway is the area bounded by Broad Street, Broadway, Bloomfield Avenue on the west, 4th Ave. on the north, the Passaic River on the east and I-280 on the south. 4th Ave Station (near Passaic St) was a stop on the Erie Lackawanna's Newark Branch, passenger service was discontinued in'66 but the freight line is still active. Today operated by Norfolk Southern Railroad Corp. South Broadway is home to the oldest functioning synagogue in Newark, Ahavas Sholom. Currently, the Jewish Museum of New Jersey is located on the synagogue's second floor. The Pavilion and Colonnade Apartments are located at the southern end of the neighborhood.

== See also ==
- Clay Street Bridge
- Newark Branch
- WR Draw
- House of Prayer Episcopal Church and Rectory
