= The Ride (The Sopranos) =

- The Sopranos episode
- Episode no.: Season 6 Episode 9
- Directed by: Alan Taylor
- Written by: Terence Winter
- Cinematography by: Phil Abraham
- Production code: 609
- Original air date: May 7, 2006
- Running time: 54 minutes

Episode chronology
← Previous "Johnny Cakes"	Next → "Moe n' Joe"
- The Sopranos season 6

"The Ride" is the 74th episode of the HBO original series The Sopranos and the ninth of the show's sixth season. Written by Terence Winter and directed by Alan Taylor, it originally aired on May 7, 2006.

== Starring ==
- James Gandolfini as Tony Soprano
- Lorraine Bracco as Dr. Jennifer Melfi
- Edie Falco as Carmela Soprano
- Michael Imperioli as Christopher Moltisanti
- Dominic Chianese as Corrado Soprano, Jr. *
- Steven Van Zandt as Silvio Dante
- Tony Sirico as Paulie Gualtieri
- Robert Iler as Anthony Soprano, Jr.
- Jamie-Lynn Sigler as Meadow Soprano
- Aida Turturro as Janice Soprano Baccalieri
- Steven R. Schirripa as Bobby Baccalieri
- Frank Vincent as Phil Leotardo
- John Ventimiglia as Artie Bucco
- Ray Abruzzo as Little Carmine Lupertazzi
- Dan Grimaldi as Patsy Parisi

* = credit only

=== Guest starring ===
- Edoardo Ballerini as Corky Caporale
- John Bianco as Gerry Torciano
- Cara Buono as Kelli Lombardo Moltisanti
- Carl Capotorto as Little Paulie Germani
- Max Casella as Benny Fazio
- John "Cha Cha" Ciarcia as Albie Cianflone
- Miryam Coppersmith as Sophia Baccalieri
- Tony Darrow as Larry Boy Barese
- William DeMeo as Jason Molinaro
- Jonathan Del Arco as Father Jose
- Frances Ensemplare as Nucci Gualtieri
- Louis Gross as Perry Annunziata
- Will Janowitz as Finn DeTrolio
- Brianna and Kimberly Laughlin as Domenica Baccalieri
- Julianna Margulies as Julianna Skiff
- Angelo Massagli as Bobby Baccalieri, Jr.
- Patty McCormack as Liz La Cerva
- Arthur Nascarella as Carlo Gervasi
- Artie Pasquale as Burt Gervasi
- Lenny Venito as James "Murmur" Zancone
- T.R. Shields III as Dale Hutchins
- Vic Noto as Viper
- Jeremy Schwartz as Biker #1
- Sylvia Kauders as Mrs. Conte
- Sal Darigo as Old Man
- Tanya P. as The Virgin Mary
- Lou Di Gennaro as Judge
- Sonny Passero as Man in Crowd
- Francis W. Erigo as Old Woman in Church
- Liz Ross as Nurse (voice)
- Barry Sigismondi as Dr. Cipolla (voice)
- Crazy Legs Conti as Himself

== Synopsis ==
Tony and Phil work out a deal to split the profits from the distribution of multivitamins acquired by Tony's crew. Phil suggests that Johnny be left out of the transaction, to which Tony agrees.

Chris is told by his girlfriend, Kelli, that she is pregnant. He is thrilled; they get married and buy a large house.

On their way home from a trip to Pennsylvania, Chris and Tony stop outside a town because Tony needs to urinate. They see two bikers stealing vintage wine from a liquor store. As the bikers go back into the store, Chris and Tony plunder their wine. They speed away and Chris exchanges gunfire with one of the bikers, wounding him. Exhilarated, Tony and Chris celebrate at a restaurant. Chris decides to break his abstinence when Tony toasts his wedding. Later, as they drink more wine in the parking lot, they reminisce about good and bad times, including the day when Chris told Tony about Adriana and the Feds. They express their long-lasting love and support for each other.

Chris pays Corky for the hit on Rusty, partly in heroin. He ends up relapsing and using heroin with Corky, spending a night of the Feast of Elzéar of Sabran in a stupor.

During the Feast, Tony and his crew manage a five-day street festival for the benefit, Paulie says, of a non-profit foundation. However, a new priest has looked into the finances and tells Paulie and Patsy that their donation to the church should be raised from $10,000 to $50,000. When Paulie refuses to pay, he tells them they will not be permitted to display the traditional golden hat which adorns the statue of the saint. Several parishioners notice that the hat is missing, and word begins to spread that Paulie scrimped on the festival.

Paulie's penny-pinching is blamed for an accident on a teacup ride at the festival, which leaves several people injured, including a child. Little Paulie is left to deal with the police investigation. Janice and her daughter Domenica are on the ride and unhurt, but Janice pretends to develop a neck injury after hearing Meadow's suggestion that the injured should be compensated monetarily. Janice presses Bobby to get the money. Threatening the ride operator, Bobby learns that Paulie refused to pay for a repair crew or for newer and safer rides. In a public confrontation at the feast, Paulie refuses to compensate Bobby. Tension lingers during Christopher's bachelor party; Tony instructs Paulie to work things out with Bobby.

Paulie later encounters Nucci, who tells him that his cost cutting was not only wrong but sinful. Paulie swears at her and departs, leaving his adoptive mother in tears. At home, he is sleepless. Another source of stress is his fear that he has prostate cancer. Very early the next morning, at the Bada Bing, Paulie has a vision of the Virgin Mary. Shaken, he visits Nucci at Green Grove that night and sits quietly next to her while they watch The Lawrence Welk Show together.

== First appearance ==
- Kelli Lombardo Moltisanti: Christopher's new girlfriend played by Cara Buono.

== Title reference ==
- The episode's title most directly refers to an amusement ride at the feast which breaks down on which Janice, Bobby III, and Domenica were all riding.
- Tony spins Domenica around as in a ride.
- The title may also refer to the ride to Pennsylvania Tony and Christopher were taking when they stole the wine and bonded.
- It may refer to the philosophical "thrill ride" discussed by Tony and Dr. Melfi—something people are ready to pay their money for and actively seek to temporarily escape their mundane lives.
- It also refers to Adriana's "one-way ride;" taking someone for a ride is a gangland execution method where a person is forced or tricked into driving to a remote area where they can be murdered and the body disposed of.

== Production ==
- The episode includes a flashback scene of Christopher's emotional revelation to Tony that Adriana had been working for the FBI. That scene was originally shot as part of episode 5.12, "Long Term Parking" (directed by Tim Van Patten and photographed by Alik Sakharov), but had been cut to heighten the suspense surrounding Adriana's murder.
- The feast depicted in the episode and named as the Feast of St. Elzéar is based on the annual Feast of St. Gerard, organized every October around the church of St. Lucy's in the Seventh Avenue of Newark, a historical neighborhood of Italian-Americans, which used to be known as the First Ward. In addition to the street procession with the dollar-bill-covered statue of the saint, the feast features light shows, street decorations with colors of the Italian flag, food stands, and music (including an orchestra). David Chase said that he wanted to create an episode about the feast ever since the first season.
- Actor Tony Sirico, who plays Paulie, cited the final scene as probably his character's favorite thing to do with his mother as a child, going on to explain that he really has no one else who loves him, which explains Nucci's sudden change in mood and silence.

== References to prior episodes ==
- When asked if he has any family history of prostate cancer, Paulie says "I don't know!", referencing how he discovered in "The Fleshy Part of the Thigh" that his mother was actually his "aunt" Dottie, and his father is a man he never knew.
- Paulie is not able to sleep and anxiously calls his doctor to learn the results of the prostate biopsy at 3 AM. In "From Where to Eternity," Christopher, awoken from a coma, told Paulie a message from what he claimed to have been the afterlife he visited—"three o'clock." Paulie disavowed the Church in that episode. This time, Paulie curses at the statue of Saint Elzéar, refuses to pay for its hat to be carried on it during the procession, and insults his adoptive mother by mentioning sinful deeds until he has a disturbing vision of the Virgin Mary at the Bada Bing!.
- Christopher mentions his inability to have children from his previous relationship with Adriana. Unwilling to acknowledge her murder, he continues with the story of her running away.
- Carmela mentions Christopher's previous violence towards Adriana, seen in "The Strong, Silent Type."
- At the fair, Paulie demands payment from a vendor, who later pays him short, claiming he is entitled to a rebate or rain check as is customary in Ohio. Paulie later rebukes this and tells him "yet another reason I don't live in Ohio", referencing his arrest in Youngstown, Ohio at the start of Season 4.

== Music ==
- The song playing in the background at the Bada Bing! while Christopher announces his marriage is "Flash and Crash" by 1960s Seattle garage rock band Rocky & The Riddlers.
- The music playing while Christopher and Tony are driving and stealing wine is "All Right Now" by British rock band Free.
- The song briefly playing while Christopher and Tony are driving home is "Midnight Rider" by Buddy Miles.
- The song playing throughout Christopher's high is "The Dolphins" by folk artist Fred Neil.
- The song played when Tony Soprano and Phil Leotardo meet at the feast is "A Chi" by Italian singer Fausto Leali. The song is played again at the end of the episode when Tony and Carmela join the Baccalieris at the feast.
- The song played when Tony Soprano lifts his niece and spins her around is "Red River Rock" by Johnny & The Hurricanes.
- The song snippet briefly heard when Paulie sees an apparition of the Virgin Mary at the Bada Bing! is "Cinnabar (Hairsprayed Ways Mix)", by the electronic music group Tipsy.
- The polka played on accordion by Myron Floren on The Lawrence Welk Show during Paulie's visit to Nucci is the Norwegian children's song "Hompetitten" (presented as "Johnny Oslo Schottische"). The music was written by Gunnar Wahlberg and originally had lyrics by Alf Prøysen.
- A live cover version of "Pipeline", performed by Johnny Thunders, plays over the episode credits.

== Reception ==
For The Star-Ledger, Alan Sepinwall noted the irony of the main characters paying tribute to St. Elzear, due to Elzear being chaste. Regarding the subplot with Paulie, Sepinwall called him a "cheap, whiny SOB with a raging sense of entitlement."

Television Without Pity graded the episode with a B. The review questioned the casting of Father Jose, due to his accent fluctuating between Irish and Latin, and criticized the inclusion of Christopher's drug high at the St. Elzear Festival as filler. Boston Globe critic Joanna Weiss found the episode to show Tony as "a glorified, glamourized, high-falutin' street-level crook" due to his "lack of pathos about Adriana" and "indifference to Christopher's efforts to stay sober".
