= Hannibal Goodwin =

American inventor in film development

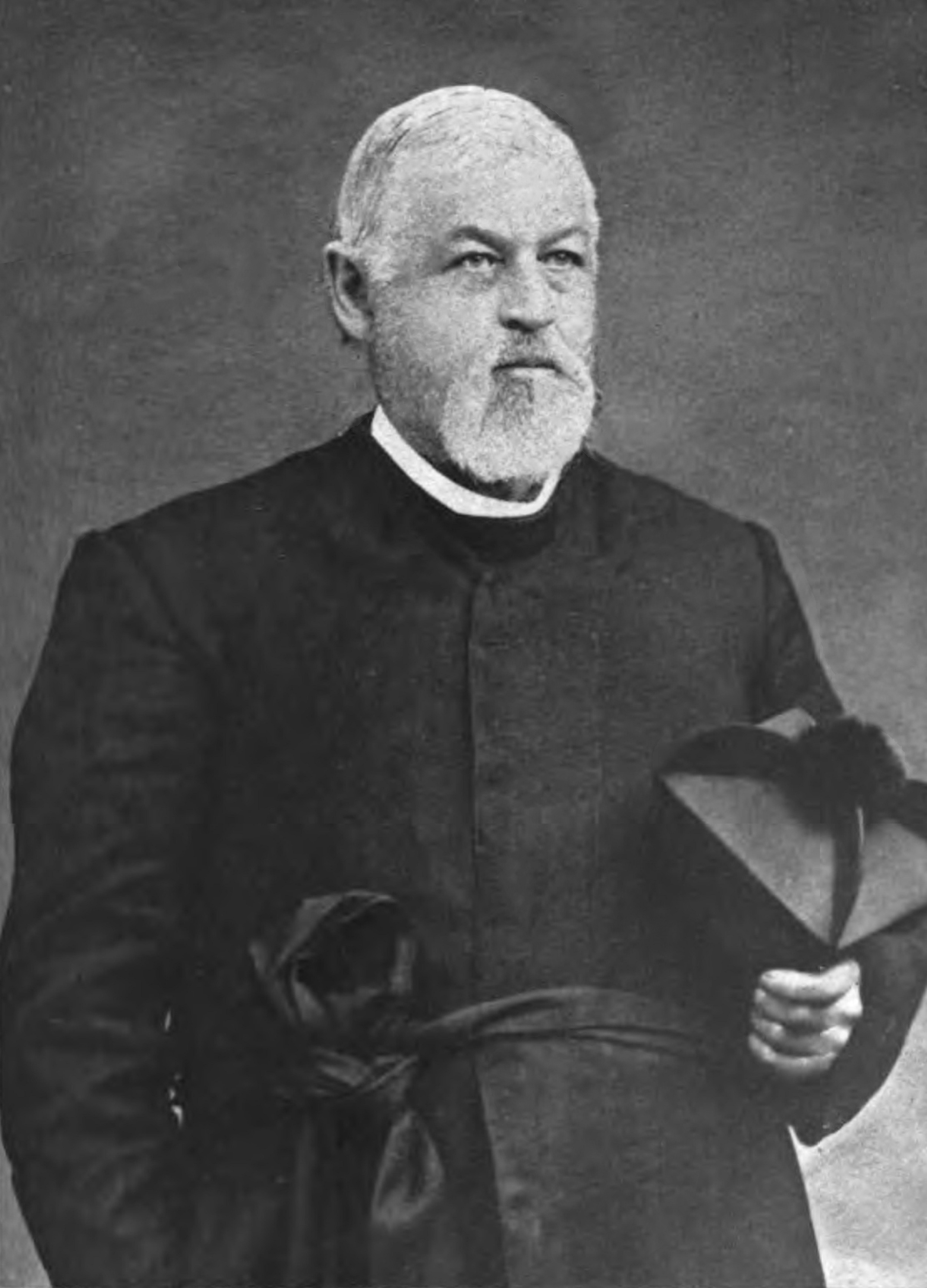
- Born: April 30, 1822; Ulysses, New York
- Died: December 31, 1900 (aged 78)
- Occupations: Episcopal Clergyman, Inventor
- Known for: inventing celluloid photofilm
- Spouse: Rebecca

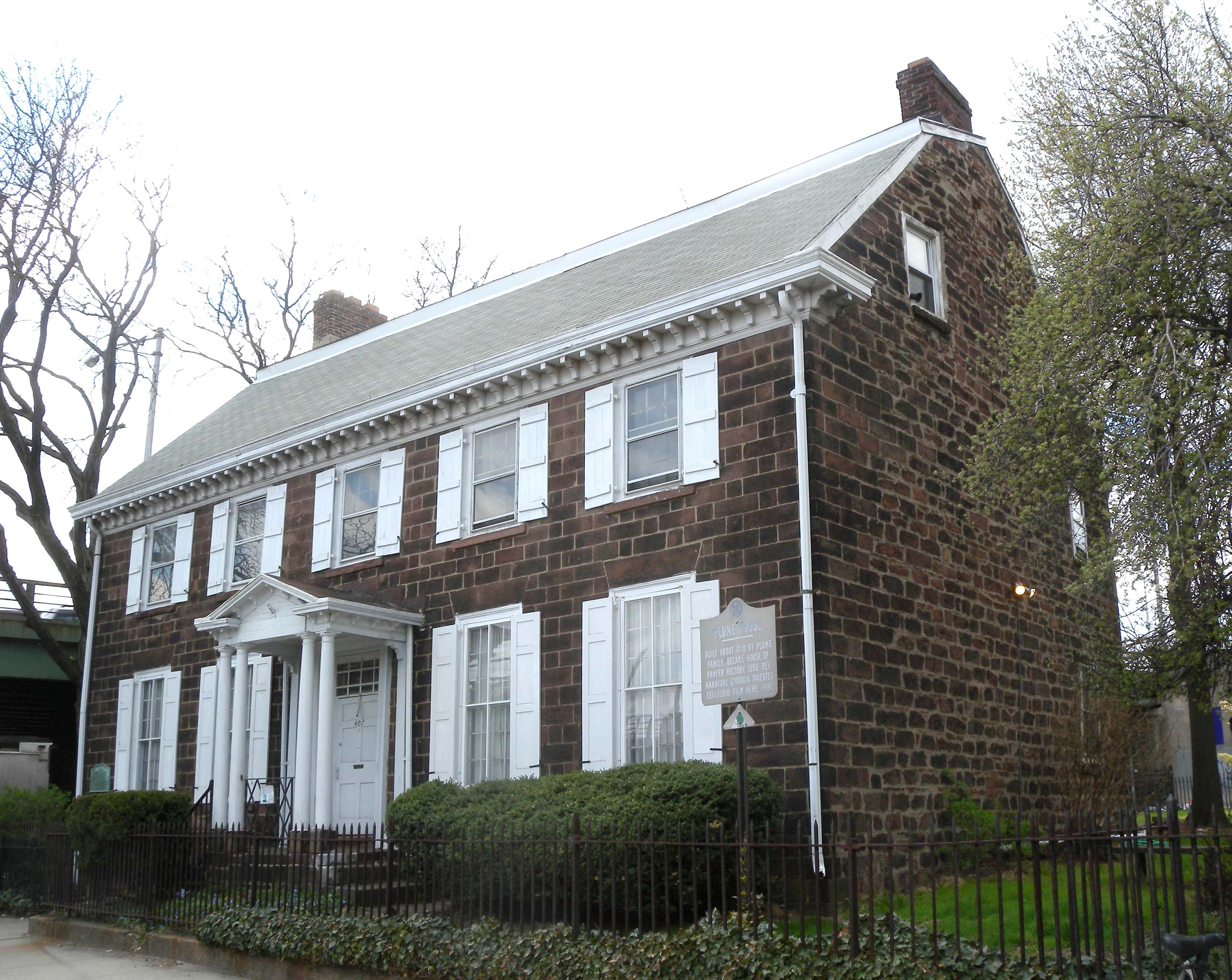
Goodwin living quarters at the Plume House rectory of House of Prayer Church, now listed on the National Register of Historic Places

Hannibal Williston Goodwin (April 30, 1822 – December 31, 1900), patented a method for making transparent, flexible roll film out of nitrocellulose film base, which was used in Thomas Edison's Kinetoscope, an early machine for viewing motion pictures.

== Biography ==
Goodwin was born on April 30, 1822, in Ulysses, New York, and was raised on a farm. He began taking college classes at Yale Law School in 1844, then Wesleyan University, and finally earned his degree in 1848 at Union College. Goodwin began studying at Union Theological Seminary in New York City to become an Episcopal preacher. After taking positions in Bordentown (Christ Church, 1852-1854), Newark (St. Paul's, 1854-1858), and Trenton (Trinity Church, 1859) in New Jersey, he went to California to recover his health from a bronchial complaint, serving parishes in Napa (Christ Church, 1859-1862), Marysville (St. John's, c.1859-1862), and San Francisco (Grace Church/Cathedral, 1862-1867). In 1867, Goodwin came back to New Jersey and settled down as the fifth rector of the House of Prayer Church in Newark, where he would serve the next twenty years in Essex County, New Jersey.

Goodwin was motivated to search for a non-breakable, and clear substance on which he could place the images he utilized in his Biblical teachings. He set up a chemistry lab in the attic of the Plum house rectory and sawed a five foot hole in the roof for better sunlight. On May 2, 1887, the year Goodwin retired from the church he had served for twenty years, he filed a patent for "a photographic pellicle and process of producing same ... especially in connection with roller cameras", but the patent was not granted until 13 September 1898. In the meantime, George Eastman had already started production of roll-film using his own process.

In 1900, Goodwin set up the Goodwin Film and Camera Company, but before film production had started he was involved in a street accident near a construction site and died from complications of a broken leg and pneumonia on December 31, 1900.

== Legacy ==
Goodwin's patent was sold to the Ansco Company who successfully sued Eastman Kodak for infringement of the patent and was awarded $5 million (over $120 million in 2020) on March 10, 1914.

The Newark International Film Festival named one of their main awards the Hannibal Goodwin Award for Innovation in Filmmaking.
