= House of Prayer Episcopal Church and Rectory =

Historic church in New Jersey, United States

- U.S. National Register of Historic Places
- New Jersey Register of Historic Places
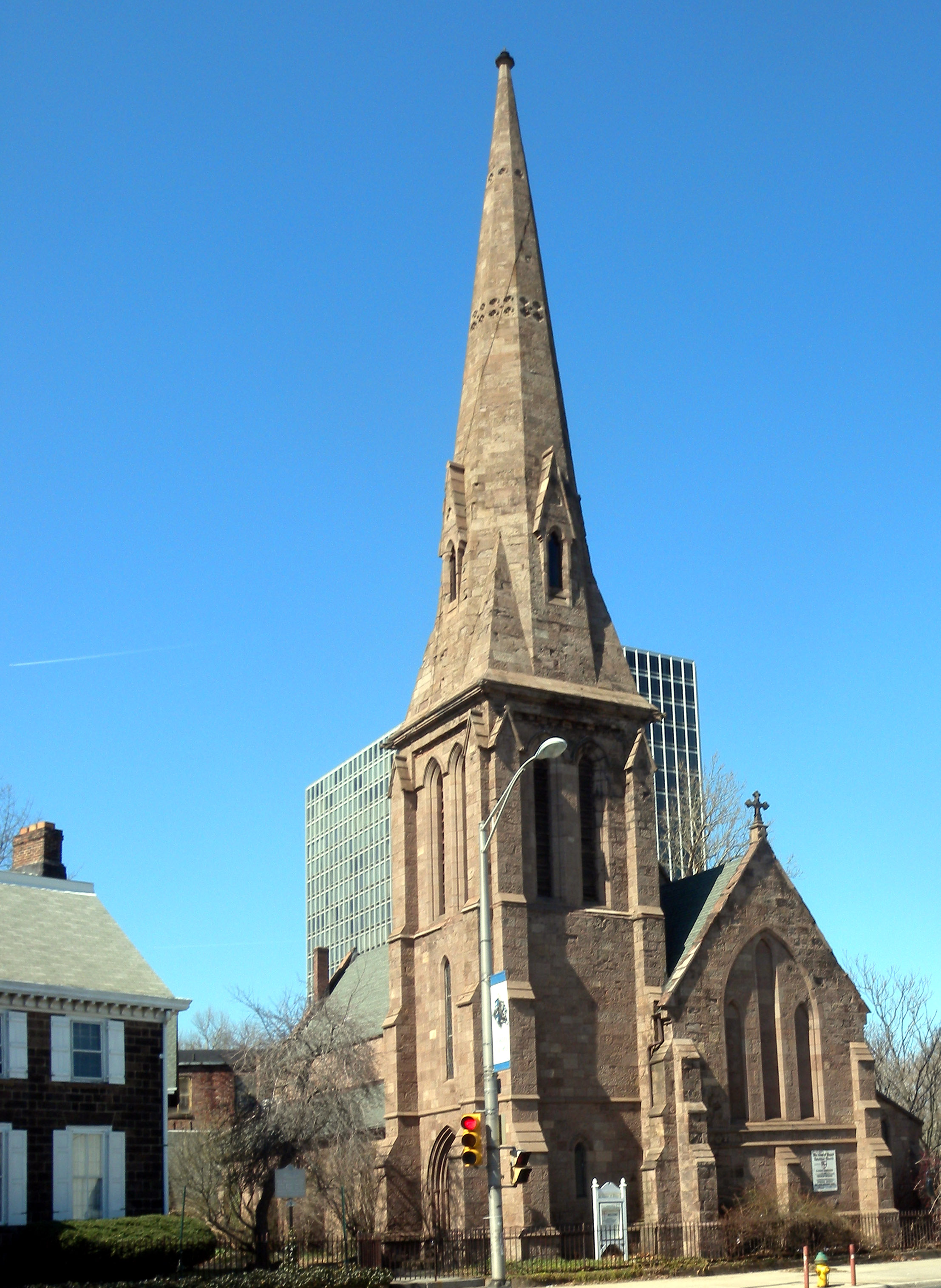

- Location within Essex County, New Jersey Location within New Jersey Location within the United States
- Location: Broad and State Streets, Newark, New Jersey
- Coordinates: 40°44′53″N 74°10′15″W
- Area: 1 acre (0.40 ha)
- Built: 1710
- Architects: Wills, Frank; Wood, William Halsey
- Architectural style: Gothic Revival
- NRHP reference No.: 72000777
- NJRHP No.
- Added to NRHP: October 30, 1972

House of Prayer Episcopal Church and Rectory is a historic site at Broad and State Streets in Newark, Essex County, New Jersey, United States. The house was built in prior to 1725 (c. 1710) and the church in 1849 and they were added to the National Register of Historic Places in 1972.

The rectory was the home of Hannibal Goodwin, priest and inventor. Known as the Plume House, the building is considered one of the most endangered landmarks in the state.

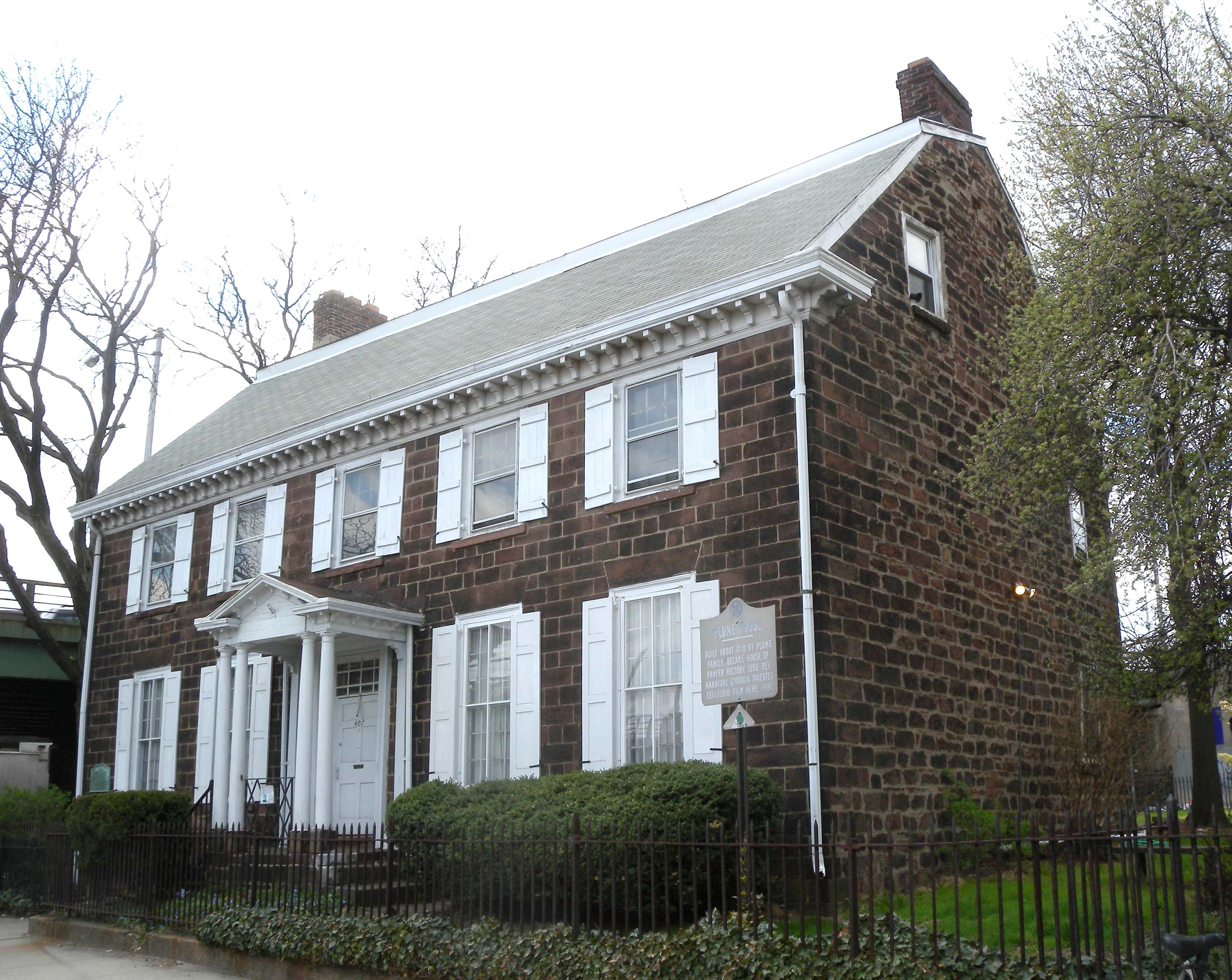
The Plume House, built in c.1710 and serves as rectory.

The parish was founded in 1849 and held its first services in the rectory on November 7. A few days later, construction began on the Gothic Revival church building, designed by Frank Wills, which was consecrated a year later. A parish hall was added in several phases later in the 19th century.

== See also ==
- National Register of Historic Places listings in Essex County, New Jersey
- List of the oldest buildings in New Jersey
