= St. Lucy's Church (Newark, New Jersey) =

Historic church in New Jersey, United States

- U.S. National Register of Historic Places
- New Jersey Register of Historic Places
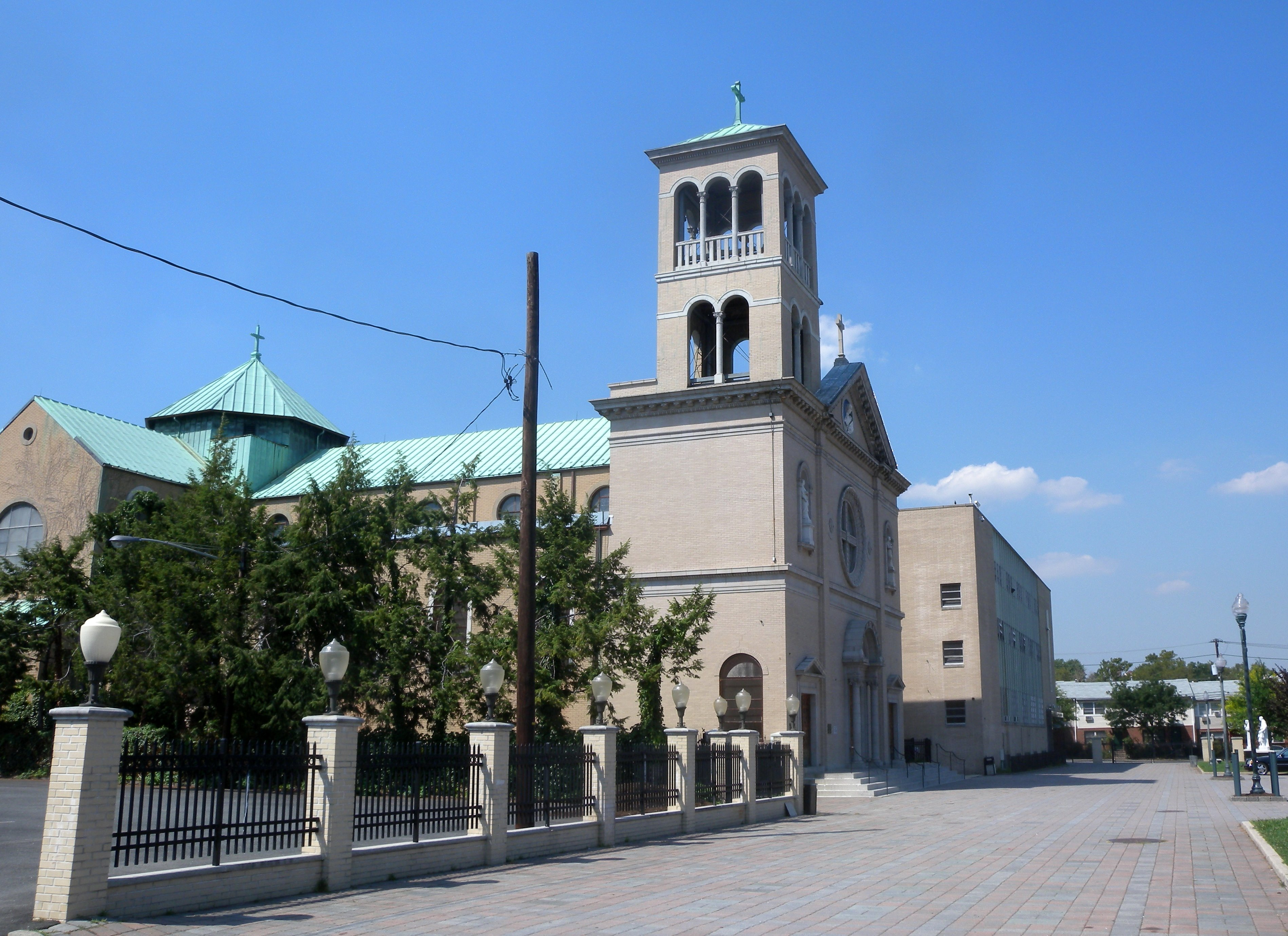

- Location within Essex County, New Jersey Location within New Jersey Location within the United States
- Location: 19-27 Ruggiero Plaza/118 Seventh Ave. Newark, New Jersey
- Coordinates: 40°45′2″N 74°10′36″W
- Area: 0.5 acres (0.20 ha)
- Built: 1925
- Architects: Convery, Neil J. Raggi, Gonippo
- Architectural style: Romanesque
- NRHP reference No.: 98001570
- NJRHP No.
- Added to NRHP: December 31, 1998

St. Lucy's Church is a historic church at 19-27 Ruggiero Plaza at the intersection of Seventh Ave.in Newark, Essex County, New Jersey, United States. It is home to the American National Shrine of Saint Gerard Majella in the Catholic Church.

It was built in 1925 and added to the National Register of Historic Places in 1998.

The church is in the Old First Ward near Branch Brook Park, a historically Italian parish in what was Newark's Little Italy, features an annual October procession and festival for St. Gerard Majella, the patron saint of childbearing, that is heavily attended by the New Jersey Italian diaspora. The October Feast of St. Gerard "became so popular and so widely-known for producing miracle babies for hitherto childless women that in 1977 the National Conference of U.S. Bishops made St. Lucy's the National Shrine of St. Gerard."

The church holds a monthly mass in honor of St. Gerard at which expectant parents and others hoping to become expectant venerate the saint.

== See also ==
- National Register of Historic Places listings in Essex County, New Jersey
