= Philip Roth bibliography =

Bibliography of works by and about Philip Roth

This is a bibliography of works by and about Philip Roth.

== Novels, novellas and memoirs ==
Year	Title	Protagonist / Narrator	Awards	Notes	LOA Volume
1959	Goodbye, Columbus	Neil Klugman	1960 National Book Award	Published with five short stories	LOA1
1962	Letting Go	Gabe Wallach			LOA1
1967	When She Was Good	Lucy Nelson			LOA2
1969	Portnoy's Complaint	Alexander Portnoy			LOA2
1971	Our Gang	Trick E. Dixon			LOA2
1972	The Breast	David Kepesh			LOA2
1973	The Great American Novel	Word Smith			LOA3
1974	My Life as a Man	Nathan Zuckerman /Peter Tarnopol		^{[I]}	LOA3
1977	The Professor of Desire	David Kepesh			LOA3
1979	The Ghost Writer	Nathan Zuckerman			LOA4
1981	Zuckerman Unbound	Nathan Zuckerman			LOA4
1983	The Anatomy Lesson	Nathan Zuckerman			LOA4
1985	The Prague Orgy	Nathan Zuckerman			LOA4
1986	The Counterlife	Nathan Zuckerman	1986 National Book Critics Circle Award		LOA5
1988	The Facts: A Novelist's Autobiography	Philip Roth			LOA5
1990	Deception	Philip Roth			LOA5
1991	Patrimony: A True Story	Philip Roth	1991 National Book Critics Circle Award		LOA5
1993	Operation Shylock	Philip Roth	1994 PEN/Faulkner Award for Fiction		LOA6
1995	Sabbath's Theater	Mickey Sabbath	1995 National Book Award		LOA6
1997	American Pastoral	Nathan Zuckerman / Swede Levov	1998 Pulitzer Prize for Fiction; 2000 Prix du Meilleur Livre Étranger		LOA7
1998	I Married a Communist	Nathan Zuckerman	1998 Ambassador Book Award		LOA7
2000	The Human Stain	Nathan Zuckerman	2001 PEN/Faulkner Award for Fiction; 2001 WH Smith Literary Award; 2002 Prix Médicis Étranger		LOA7
2001	The Dying Animal	David Kepesh			LOA8
2004	The Plot Against America	Philip Roth	2005 Sidewise Award for Alternate History		LOA8
2006	Everyman	Unnamed	2007 PEN/Faulkner Award for Fiction		LOA9
2007	Exit Ghost	Nathan Zuckerman			LOA8
2008	Indignation	Marcus Messner			LOA9
2009	The Humbling	Simon Axler			LOA9
2010	Nemesis	Bucky Cantor / Arnie Mesnikoff			LOA9

I The Nathan Zuckerman appearing in this book is not the same as the one appearing in later books, but a creation of the fictional writer Peter Tarnopol.

=== Short stories and reviews ===
Title	Original publication	Collected in:
Philosophy, or Something Like That	Et Cetera, May 1952	
The Box of Truths	Et Cetera, October 1952	
The Fence	Et Cetera, May 1953	
Armando and the Frauds	Et Cetera, October 1953	
The Final Delivery of Mr. Thorn	Et Cetera, May 1954	
The Day It Snowed	Chicago Review, 8, 1954	
The Contest for Aaron Gold	Epoch, 5–6, 1955	
You Can't Tell a Man by the Song He Sings	Commentary, 1957	Goodbye, Columbus
Positive Thinking on Pennsylvania Avenue	Chicago Review, 11, 1957	
Mrs. Lindbergh, Mr. Ciardi, and the Teeth and Claws of the Civilized World	Chicago Review, 11, 1957	
Rescue from Philosophy	The New Republic, 10 June 1957	
I Don't Want to Embarrass You	The New Republic, 15 July 1957	
The Hurdles of Satire	The New Republic, 9 September 1957	
Coronation on Channel Two	The New Republic, 23 September 1957	
Films as Sociology	The New Republic, 21 October 1957	
The Proper Study of Show Business	The New Republic, 23 December 1957	
The Conversion of the Jews	The Paris Review, Spring 1958	Goodbye, Columbus
Epstein	The Paris Review, Summer 1958	Goodbye, Columbus
Heard Melodies Are Sweeter	Esquire, August 1958	
Goodbye, Columbus	The Paris Review, Autumn-Winter 1958–59	Goodbye, Columbus
Expect the Vandals	Esquire, December 1958	
The Kind of Person I am	The New Yorker, 29 November 1958	
Defender of the Faith	The New Yorker, March 1959	Goodbye, Columbus
Eli, the Fanatic		Goodbye, Columbus
Recollections from Beyond the Last Rope	Harper's Magazine, July 1959	
The Love Vessel	The Dial, 1, 1959	
The Good Girl	Cosmopolitan, May 1960	
The Mistaken	American Judaism, 10, 1960	
Jewishness and the Younger Intellectuals	Commentary, April 1961	
American Fiction	Commentary, September 1961	
Novotny's Pain	The New Yorker, October 1962	A Philip Roth Reader (1993 ed.)
Iowa: A Very Far Country Indeed,	Esquire, December 1962	
Philip Roth Talks to Teens	Seventeen, April 1963	
Second Dialogue in Israel	Congress Bi-Weekly, 16 September 1963	
Psychoanalytic Special	Esquire, November 1963	
An Actor's Life for Me	Playboy, January 1964	
Channel X: Two Plays on the Race Conflict	The New York Review of Books, 28 May 1964	
The National Pastime	Cavalier, May 1965	
Seasons of Discontent	The New York Review of Books, 7 November 1965	
Jewish Blues	New American Review, 1, 1967	
On the Air	New American Review, 10, 1970	
Looking at Kafka	New American Review, 1973	Reading Myself and Others; A Philip Roth Reader (1993 ed.); Why Write? Collected Nonfiction 1960-2013
Imagining Jews	The New York Review of Books, 1974	Reading Myself and Others
In Search of Kafka and Other Answers	The New York Times Book Review, 15 February 1976	
Dialog: Philip Roth	Chicago Tribune, 25 September 1977	
His Mistress's Voice	Partisan Review, 53, 1986	
Smart Money	The New Yorker, February 1981	Part of Zuckerman Unbound
I Couldn't Restrain Myself	The New York Times Book Review, 21 June 1992	
A Bit of Jewish Mischief	The New York Times Book Review, 7 March 1993	
Dr. Huvelle: A Biographical Sketch	1993	34-page booklet
Juice or Gravy? How I Met My Fate in a Cafeteria	The New York Times Book Review, 18 September 1994	Why Write? Collected Nonfiction 1960-2013
The Ultimatum	The New Yorker, 26 June 1995	Part of Sabbath's Theater
Drenka's Men	The New Yorker, 10 July 1995	Part of Sabbath's Theater
Communist: Oh, Ma, Let Me Join the National Guard	The New Yorker, August 1998	Part of I Married a Communist

== Essays ==
Title	Originally published in	Collected in
Country Report: Czechoslovakia	American PEN, 1973	
Introduction to Milan Kundera, Edward and God	American Poetry Review, March/April 1974	Reading Myself and Others
Introduction to Jiří Weil, Two Stories about Nazis and Jews	American Poetry Review, September/October 1974	
Conversation in New York with Isaac Bashevis Singer about Bruno Schulz	The New York Times Book Review, 1976	Shop Talk
Conversation in London and Connecticut with Milan Kundera	The New York Times Book Review, 1980	Shop Talk
Conversation in London with Edna O'Brien	The New York Times Book Review, 1984	Shop Talk
Pictures of Malamud	The New York Times Book Review, 1986	Shop Talk
A Man Saved by His Skills. Conversation in Turin with Primo Levi	The New York Times Book Review, 12 October 1986	Shop Talk
Conversation in Jerusalem with Aharon Appelfeld	The New York Times Book Review, 1988	Shop Talk
Pictures of Guston	Vanity Fair, 1989	Shop Talk
Conversation in Prague with Ivan Klíma	The New York Times Book Review, 1990	Shop Talk
An Exchange with Mary McCarthy	The New Yorker, 1998	Shop Talk
Rereading Saul Bellow	The New Yorker, 2000	Shop Talk

== Collections ==
Title	Year	Works Included
Reading Myself and Others	1975; 2nd ed. 1985	Anthology of essays, interviews, and criticism
A Philip Roth Reader	1980; 2nd ed. 1993	Selections from Roth's first eight novels; 2nd edition includes Novotny's Pain and Looking at Kafka
Zuckerman Bound	1985	The Ghost Writer; Zuckerman Unbound; The Anatomy Lesson; The Prague Orgy
Shop Talk	2001	Roth's interviews with 20th-century writers

=== Library of America editions ===
The first nine volumes are edited by Ross Miller, the last by the author himself.

Title	Year	Works Included
Novels and Stories 1959–1962	2005	Goodbye, Columbus; Letting Go
Novels 1967–1972	2005	When She Was Good; Portnoy's Complaint; Our Gang; The Breast
Novels 1973–1977	2006	The Great American Novel; My Life As a Man; The Professor of Desire
Zuckerman Bound 1979–1985	2007	The Ghost Writer; Zuckerman Unbound; The Anatomy Lesson; The Prague Orgy unproduced television screenplay for The Prague Orgy
Novels and Other Narratives 1986–1991	2008	The Counterlife; The Facts: A Novelist's Autobiography; Deception; Patrimony: A True Story
Novels 1993–1995	2010	Operation Shylock; Sabbath's Theater
American Trilogy 1997–2000	2011	American Pastoral; I Married a Communist; The Human Stain
Novels 2001–2007	2013	The Dying Animal; The Plot Against America; Exit Ghost
Nemeses	2013	Everyman; Indignation; The Humbling; Nemesis
Why Write?: Collected Nonfiction 1960–2013	2017	Roth's selection from Reading Myself and Others (1975); Shop Talk (2001); Explanations (14 later pieces) (total 37 articles or essays)

== Adaptations ==
=== Roth's adaptations of works by others ===
- Theatre Adaptation of It Isn't Fair by Jean Rhys (in collaboration with David Plante), 1977
- Theatre Adaptation of Journey into the Whirlwind by Yevgenia Ginzburg, 1977
- Theatre Adaptation of The Cherry Orchard by Anton Chekhov (in collaboration with David Magarshack), 1977
- Theatre Adaptation of The Name-Day Party by Anton Chekhov, 1977

=== Roth's adaptations of his own work ===
- TV Adaptation of The Ghost Writer (in collaboration with Tristram Powell), 1984
- TV Adaptation of The Prague Orgy (unproduced), 1985

=== Adaptations of Roth's work by others ===
- Battle of Blood Island - 1960 film, based on Roth's 1958 short story "Expect the Vandals"
- The Contest for Aaron Gold - 1960 TV film, based on Roth's 1955 short story
- Paul Loves Libby - 1963 TV film, based on Letting Go
- Eli, the Fanatic - 1964 TV film, based on Roth's 1959 short story
- Goodbye, Columbus - 1969 film
- Portnoy's Complaint - 1972 film
- The Ghost Writer - 1983 TV film
- The Human Stain - 2003 film
- Elegy - 2008 film; adaptation of The Dying Animal
- The Humbling - 2014 film
- American Pastoral - 2016 film
- Indignation - 2016 film
- The Prague Orgy - 2019 film
- The Plot Against America - 2020 miniseries
- Deception - 2021 film

== Interviews ==
interviewer	Title	Originally published in	Notes
Martha McGregor	The NBA Winner Talks Back	1960	in George J. Searles (ed.), Conversations with Philip Roth (Jackson, U.P. of Mississippi, 1992)
Jerre Mangione	Philip Roth	1966	in G. J. Searles (ed.), cit.
	Philip Roth Tells about When She Was Good	Literary Guild Magazine, July 1967	
Howard Junker	Will This Finally Be Philip Roth's Year?	1969	in G. J. Searles (ed.), cit.
Albert Goldman	Portnoy's Complaint by Philip Roth Looms as a Wild Blue Shocker and the American Novel of the Sixties	1969	in G. J. Searles (ed.), cit.
George Plimpton	Philip Roth's Exact Intent	1969	in G. J. Searles (ed.), cit.
Alan Lelchuk	On Satirizing Presidents	1971	in G. J. Searles (ed.), cit.
Walter Clemons	Joking in the Square	1971	in G. J. Searles (ed.), cit.
Alan Lelchuk	On The Breast	1972	in G. J. Searles (ed.), cit.
Joyce Carol Oates	A Conversation with Philip Roth	Ontario Review, Fall 1974	
Martha Saxton	Philip Roth Talks about His Own Work	1974	in G. J. Searles (ed.), cit.
Walter Mauro	Writing and the Powers-that-Be	1974	in G. J. Searles (ed.), cit. Reading Myself and Others; Why Write? Collected Nonfiction 1960-2013
Sara Davidson	Talk with Philip Roth	1977	in G. J. Searles (ed.), cit.
James Atlas	A Visit with Philip Roth	1979	in G. J. Searles (ed.), cit.
Michiko Kakutani	Is Roth Really Writing about Roth?	New York Times, May 1981	
Richard Stern	Roth Unbound	Saturday Review, June 1981	
Alan Finkielkraut	The Ghosts of Roth	1981	in G. J. Searles (ed.), cit.
Ronald Hayman	Philip Roth: Should Sane Women Shy Away from Him at Parties?	1981	in G. J. Searles (ed.), cit.
	The Book That I'm Writing	New York Times, 12 June 1983, late ed.	
Cathleen Medwick	A Meeting of Arts and Minds	1983	in G. J. Searles (ed.), cit.
Jonathan Brent	"The job", says Roth, "was to give pain its due"	1983	in G. J. Searles (ed.), cit.
Jesse Kornbluth	Zuckerman Found? Philip Roth's One-Man Art Colony	1983	in G. J. Searles (ed.), cit.
David Plante	Conversations with Philip: Diary of a Friendship	1984	in G. J. Searles (ed.), cit.
Hermione Lee	The Art of Fiction, LXXXIV	1984	in G. J. Searles (ed.), cit.
Clive Sinclair	Doctor or Pornographer? Clive Sinclair Talks to Philip Roth about His New Book,	1984	in G. J. Searles (ed.), cit.
Mervyn Rothstein	The Unbounded Spirit of Philip Roth	New York Times, 1 August 1985	
Ian Hamilton	A Confusion of Realms	1985	in G. J. Searles (ed.), cit.
Mervyn Rothstein	Philip Roth and the World of «What If?»	1986	in G. J. Searles (ed.), cit.
Paula Span	Roth's Zuckerman Redux; for «The Counterlife», Leading His Altered Ego through Life, Death and Renewal	Washington Post, 6 January 1987	
Paul Gray	The Varnished Truths of Philip Roth	1987	in G. J. Searles (ed.), cit.
Alvin P. Sanoff	Writers Have a Third Eye	1987	in G. J. Searles (ed.), cit.
Katharine Weber	Life, Counterlife	1987	in G. J. Searles (ed.), cit.
Ken Adachi	Is Anyone out There Actually Reading?	Toronto Star, 17 September 1988	
Asher Z. Milbauer and Donald G. Watson	An Interview with Philip Roth	1988	in G. J. Searles (ed.), cit.
Jonathan Brent	What Facts? A Talk with Philip Roth	1988	in G. J. Searles (ed.), cit.
Katharine Weber	PW Interviews: Philip Roth	1988	in G. J. Searles (ed.), cit.
Linda Matchan	Philip Roth Faces "The Facts"	1988	in G. J. Searles (ed.), cit.
Mervyn Rothstein	From Philip Roth, "The Facts" as He Remembers Them	1988	in G. J. Searles (ed.), cit.
	Goodbye Newark: Roth Remembers His Beginnings	New York Times, 1 October 1989	
Brian D. Johnson	Intimate Affairs	1990	in G. J. Searles (ed.), cit.
Hermione Lee	"Life Is and": Philip Roth in 1990	1990	in G. J. Searles (ed.), cit.
Alvin P. Sanoff	Facing a Father's Death	1990	in G. J. Searles (ed.), cit.
Lynn Darling	His Father's Son	Newsday, 28 January 1991	
Lynn Darling	A Moving Family Memoir on Life and Death in «Patrimony»	1991	in G. J. Searles (ed.), cit.
Mervyn Rothstein	To Newark, with Love. Philip Roth	1991	in G. J. Searles (ed.), cit.
Molly McQuade	Just a Lively Boy	1991	in G. J. Searles (ed.), cit.
Marjorie Keyishian	Roth Returning to Newark to Get History Award	New York Times, 4 October 1992	
Esther B. Fein	Philip Roth Sees Double. And Maybe Triple, Too	New York Times, 9 March 1993	
Esther B. Fein	"Believe Me," Says Roth with a Straight Face	New York Times, 9 March 1993 late ed.	
Dan Cryer	Talking with Philip Roth: Author Meets the Critics	Newsday, 28 March 1993	
Mifflin Houghton	I Married a Communist Interview	1998	link
Christa Maerker	The Roth Explosion: Confessions of a Writer	1998	film (duration: 53')
Charles McGrath	Zuckerman's Alter Brain	New York Times Book Review, 7 May 2000	
Terry Gross	Interview	Fresh Air (radio), 8 May 2000	afterward in Fresh Air: Writers Speak with Terry Gross, Minneapolis: Highbridge, 2004; and in Writers Speak: A Collection of Interviews with Writers on Fresh Air with Terry Gross, Boston: WHYY, 2004
Robert McCrum	A Conversation with Philip Roth	Guardian Unlimited, 1 July 2001	link
David Remnick	Philip Roth at 70	BBC4, London, 19 March 2003	
Robert Siege	Roth Rewrites History with "The Plot Against America"	"All Things Considered" (radio), 23 September 2004	WNYC, New York
John Freeman	The America That Was, and the Past That Wasn't	San Francisco Chronicle, 3 October 2004	link
	"NPR Interview with Philip Roth"	NPR's Fresh Air, 11 October 2004	link
Jeffrey Brown	Interview	«News Hour with Jim Lehrer», PBS, 27 October 2004 and 10 November 2004	
Kurt Anderson	Interview	«Studio 360», 6 November 2004	WNYC, New York
Katie Couric	Interview	«Today Show», NBC, 2004	
Tom Ashbrook	Novelist Philip Roth	«On Point», 3 December 2004	WBUR, Boston
Michael Krasny	Interview	Forum, 29 December 2004	KQED, San Francisco
Nils Minkmar	Interview	Frankfurter Allgemeine Sonntagszeitung, 8 August 2005	in German
Sacha Verna	Ich frage, was wäre...	Die Zeit, 18 August 2005	in German
Charles McGrath	Why Is This Man Smiling?	New York Times, 4 September 2005, late ed.	
Martin Krasnik	It No Longer Feels a Great Injustice That I Have to Die	The Guardian, 14 December 2005	link
Terry Gross	Philip Roth Discusses His Latest Accolade	«Fresh Air», 28 December 2005	WHYY, Philadelphia on link
Charles McGrath	Philip Roth, Haunted by Illness, Feels Fine	New York Times, 25 April 2006	
Robert Siege	Roth Returns with Life and Death of Everyman	«All Things Considered», 2 May 2006	
Terry Gross	Philip Roth Discusses Everyman	«Fresh Air», 8 May 2006	WHYY, Philadelphia
Mark Lawson	Philip Roth's 21st Century	«Mark Lawson Talks to...», BBC4, London, 3 June 2006	
Volker Hage	Old Age Is a Massacre	Spiegel Online, 25 August 2006	
Hans Olav Brenner	Interview	Bokprogrammet NRK1, 27 August 2007	NBC
John Freeman	Philip Roth Ponders Aging	«Star-Ledger» [Newark, NJ], 23 September 2007	
Robert Siegel	Author Says New Zuckerman Novel to Be the Last	«All Things Considered», 24 September 2007	link
Terry Gross	Philip Roth's «Ghost» Returns	«Fresh Air», 25 September 2007	WHYY, Philadelphia
Hillel Italie	Roth Says Farewell to Fictional Hero	«Associated Press Archive», 27 September 2007	on link (20 March 2009)
Robert J. Hughes	Roth Says: Goodbye, Nathan	«Wall Street Journal», 28 September 2007	link
Mark Weitzmann	In Conversation...	Washington Post, 30 September 2007	link
James Mustich	Roth on Zuckerman's Curtain Call	«Barnes & Noble Review», 1 October 2007	
Hermione Lee	Age Makes a Difference	«The New Yorker», 1 October 2007	link and link
Mark Lawson	Philip Roth in His Own Words	«Front Row», Radio 4. BBC, London, 2 October 2007 and The Independent, London, 3 October 2007	link
Johanna Schneller	Philip Roth: «I'm not crazy... that time is running out»	The Globe and Mail Canada, 13 October 2007	link
Tom Nissley	Exit Zuckerman: An Interview with Philip Roth	No date [but 2007] on Amazon site	transcript of audio interview
Klaus Brinkbäumer and Volker Hage	Bush Is Too Horrendous to Be Forgotten	Spiegel Online, 8 February 2008	
Jeffrey A. Trachtenberg	Philip Roth Goes Back to College	The Wall Street Journal, 12 September 2008	
James Marcus	Philip Roth, on Writing and Being Ticked Off	Los Angeles Times, 14 September 2008	link
Robert Siege	In Indignation, Roth Draws On His College Days	«All Things Considered», 15 September 2008	link
Philip Dodd	Interview	«Night Waves», 15 September 2008	BBC Radio 3
Benjamin Taylor	Interview	Live Webcast Sponsored by Houghton Mifflin, 16 September 2008	
Robert Hilferty	Interview	«Muse TV», 19 September 2008	link and link
Robert McCrum	The Story of My Lives	Observer Magazine, 21 September 2008	link
Jeff Baker	Interview	The Oregonian, 21 September 2008	Edited and condensed interview. Full version is on link (18 September 2008)
James Mustich	Philip Roth: Indignation	«Barnes & Noble Review», 3 November 2008	link
Andrew Corsello	Last Lion Roaring	Gentlemen's Quarterly, December 2008	
Tina Brown	Philip Roth Unbound	The Daily Beast, 21 October 2009	link
Jeffrey A. Trachtenberg	Roth on Roth	Wall Street Journal, 23 October 2009	link
Kirsty Wark	Interview	Newsnight, BBC2, London, 30 October 2009	link
Paola Zanuttini	Sex and Me	La Repubblica, February 2010	Italian interview. Notice by Judith Thurman on The New Yorker, 5 April 2010
Rita Braver	Philip Roth on Fame, Sex and God	CBS News, 10 March 2010	link
Chris Wragge and Erica Hill	A Rare Look at Author Phillip Roth	CBS News, 3 October 2010	link
	Philip Roth: On Writing, Aging and «Nemesis»	NPR, 14 October 2010	link
Benjamin Taylor	Man Booker International Prize 2011 Winner Philip Roth	23 May 2011	link video transcript
Eleanor Wachtel	Philip Roth Interview	CBC Radio, 27 March 2011	link

== Criticism ==
- Glenn Meeter, Bernard Malamud and Philip Roth: A Critical Essay, Grand Rapids: Eerdsmans, 1968
- John N. McDaniel, The Fiction of Philip Roth, Haddonfield, NJ: Haddonfield House, 1974
- Sanford Pinsker, The Comedy That "Hoits": An Essay on the Fiction of Philip Roth, Columbia: University of Missouri Press, 1975
- Bernard F. Rodgers Jr., Philip Roth, Boston: Twayne, 1978
- Judith Paterson Jones e Guinevera A. Nance, Philip Roth, New York: Ungar, 1981
- Sanford Pinsker (ed.), Critical Essays on Philip Roth, Boston: Hall, 1982
- Herminone Lee, Philip Roth, New York: Methuen, 1982
- George J. Searles, The Fiction of Philip Roth and John Updike, Carbondale: Southern Illinois U.P., 1985
- Harold Bloom (ed.), Philip Roth, Modern Critical Views, New York: Chelsea House, 1986; new ed. 2003
- Asher Z. Milbauer e Donald G. Watson (eds.), Reading Philip Roth, New York: St. Martin's Press, 1988
- Murray Baumgarten e Barbara Gottfried, Understanding Philip Roth, Columbia: University of South Carolina Press, 1990
- Jay L. Halio, Philip Roth Revisited, New York: Twayne, 1992
- Alan Cooper, Philip Roth and the Jews, Albany: SUNY Press, 1996
- Stephen Wade, Imagination in Transit: The Fiction of Philip Roth, Sheffield: Sheffield Academic Press, 1996
- Stephen Milowitz, Philip Roth Considered: The Concentrationary Universe of the American Writer, New York: Garland Press, 2000
- Jay L. Halio (ed.), Philip Roth, special issue of Shofar, 19, 1, 2000
- Nandita Singh, Philip Roth: A Novelist in Crisis, New Delhi: Classical Publishing, 2001
- André Bleikasten, Philip Roth: Les ruses de la fiction, Paris: Belin, 2001
- Paule Lévy e Ada Savin (eds.), Profils Américains: Philip Roth, Université Paul-Valéry Montpellier III: CERCLA, 2002
- Mark Shechner, Up Society's Ass, Copper: Rereading Philip Roth, Madison: University of Wisconsin Press, 2003
- Debra Shostak, Philip Roth - Countertexts, Counterlives, Columbia, SC: University of South Carolina Press, 2004
- Harold Bloom (ed.), Portnoy's Complaint: Modern Critical Interpretations, Modern Critical Views, New York: Chelsea House, 2004
- Derek Parker Royal (ed.), Philip Roth's America: The Later Novels, special issue of Studies in American Jewish Literature, 23, 2004
- Yanyu Zeng, Towards Postmodern Multiculturalism: A New Trend of African-American and Jewish American Literature Viewed through Ishmael Reed and Philip Roth, Xiamen: Xiamen U.P., 2004
- Manuel Gogos, Philip Roth & Söhne: Zum jüdischen Familienroman, Hamburg: Philo, 2005
- Jay L. Halio e Ben Siegel, Turning Up the Flame: Philip Roth's Later Novels, Newark, DE: University of Delaware Press, 2005
- Derek Parker Royal (ed.), Philip Roth: New Perspectives on an American Author, Westport, CT: Greenwood-Praeger, 2005
- Elaine B. Safer, Mocking the Age: The Later Novels of Philip Roth, Albany: State University of New York Press, 2006
- Till Kinzel, Die Tragödie und Komödie des amerikanischen Lebens: Eine Studie zu Zuckermans Amerika in Philip Roths Amerika-Trilogie, Heidelberg: Universitätsverlag Winter GmbH Heidelberg, 2006
- Ross Posnock, Philip Roth's Rude Truth: The Art of Immaturity, Princeton: Princeton U.P., 2006
- Dean J. Franco (ed.), Roth and Race, special issue of Philip Roth Studies, 2, 2, 2006
- Timothy Parrish (ed.), The Cambridge Companion to Philip Roth, Cambridge U.P., 2007
- David Brauner, Philip Roth, Manchester: Manchester U.P., 2007
- Aimée Pozorski and Miriam Jaffe-Foger (eds.), Mourning Zuckerman, special issue of Philip Roth Studies, 5, 2, 2009
- Balbir Singh, The Early Fiction of Philip Roth New Delhi: Omega Publications, 2009
- Alain Finkielkraut, "La Plaisanterie" (on The Human Stain), in Un coeur intelligent, Paris: Stock/Flammarion, 2009.
- Ben Siegel and Jay L. Halio (eds.), Playful and Serious: Philip Roth as Comic Writer, Newark, DE: University of Delaware Press, 2010
- Alain Finkielkraut, "La complainte du désamour" (on The Professor of Desire), in Et si l'amour durait Paris: Stock, 2011.
- Aimée Pozorski, Roth and Trauma: The Problem of History in the Later Works (1995-2010), New York, NY: Continuum Press, 2012
- Sebastian Schmitt, Fifties Nostalgia in Selected Novels of Philip Roth (MOSAIC, 60), Trier, WVT, 2017.
