= Reading Myself and Others =

1975 anthology of essays, interviews and criticism by Philip Roth

- Reading Myself and Others first edition cover
- Author: Philip Roth
- Language: English
- Subject: Literature, writing
- Genre: Non-fiction anthology
- Publisher: Farrar, Straus and Giroux
- Publication date: January 1, 1975
- Media type: Print
- Pages: 270 pp (1st ed.)
- ISBN: 0-374-24753-6

Reading Myself and Others (1975) is an anthology of essays, interviews and criticism by the author Philip Roth. The first half of the book is built mainly upon Roth's assessment of his own published works at the time of the anthology's publication. The second half of the volume consists of essays and introductions by Roth about other authors. Many of the essays were occasioned by the abrupt fame and scrutiny which came to Roth upon the publication of his storm-provoking fourth novel, Portnoy's Complaint (1969). In the "Author's Note", Roth writes that the selections in the book "are largely the by-products of getting started as a novelist, and then of taking stock."

Reading Myself includes interviews of Roth conducted by other authors as well as several essays in which Roth attempts to answer some of the critics of his early works. Among the interviews, one was conducted by the author Joyce Carol Oates about Roth's novel The Breast (1972). Appropriate to the book's title, Roth even conducts a self-interview about the origins and intentions of his work. Reading Myself also includes a letter that Roth wrote, but never sent, to the literary critic Diana Trilling in response to her dismissive review of Portnoy's Complaint; Trilling found Portnoy "lacking", but Roth found Trilling's reasoning as lacking too.
