= Indignation (disambiguation) =

Indignation is a feeling related to one's perception of having been offended or wronged and a tendency to undo that wrongdoing by retaliation.

Indignation may also refer to:

- Indignation (word), the etymology and rhetorical use of the word
- IndigNation, a gay pride event
- Indignation (novel), a 2008 novel by Philip Roth
- Indignation (film), a 2016 film based on the Roth novel
