= A Philip Roth Reader =

1980 selection of writings by Philip Roth

- First edition
- Author: Philip Roth
- Language: English
- Publisher: Farrar, Straus & Giroux
- Publication date: 1980
- Publication place: United States
- Media type: Print (hardback & paperback)

A Philip Roth Reader is a selection of writings by Philip Roth first published in 1980 by Farrar, Straus and Giroux, with a revised version reprinted in 1993 by Vintage Books. It includes selections from Roth's first eight novels (up to The Ghost Writer), along with the previously uncollected story "Novotny's Pain" and the essay-story "Looking at Kafka."

The selections were made and arranged by Roth himself. They include a revised version of The Breast.

The book provides "a solid introduction to his fiction", including "many of the best episodes from his best novels". The Glasgow Herald praised its riches, but suggested that readers should take it in small doses.
