= The Dying Animal =

2001 novel by Philip Roth

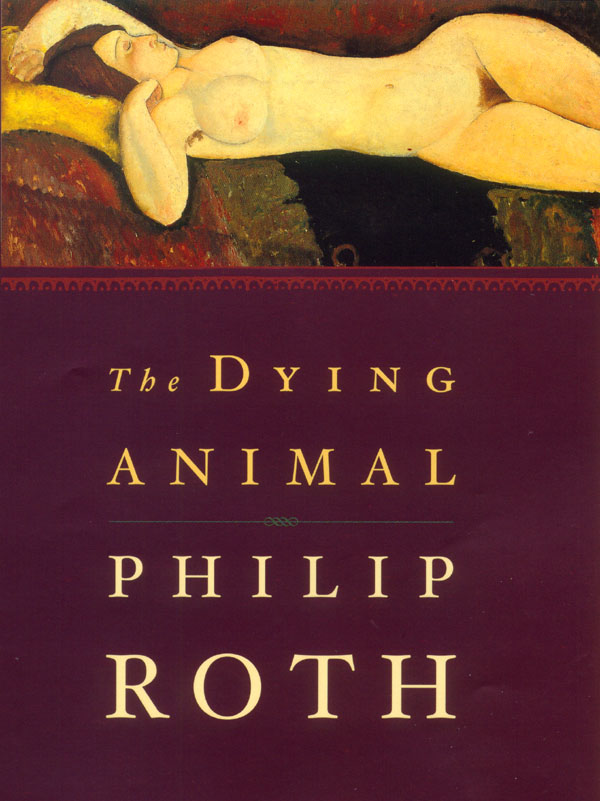
- First edition cover
- Author: Philip Roth
- Cover artist: Amedeo Modigliani (cover features his painting Le grand nu)
- Language: English
- Genre: Novel
- Publisher: Houghton Mifflin
- Publication date: 2001
- Publication place: United States
- Media type: Print (Hardback & Paperback)
- Pages: 156 pp
- ISBN: 0-618-13587-1
- OCLC: 3089703

The Dying Animal (2001) is a short novel by the US writer Philip Roth. It tells the story of senior literature professor David Kepesh, renowned for his literature-themed radio show. Kepesh is finally destroyed by his inability to comprehend emotional commitment. The Dying Animal is the third book in a series portraying the life of the fictional professor, preceded by The Breast (1972) and The Professor of Desire (1977).

== Plot summary ==
Kepesh is fascinated by the beautiful young Consuela Castillo, a student in one of his courses. An erotic liaison is formed between the two; Kepesh becomes obsessively enamored of his lover's breasts, a fetish developed in the previous novels. Despite his fevered devotion to Consuela, the sexually promiscuous professor maintains a concurrent affair with a previous lover, now divorced. He is also reluctant to expose himself to the scrutiny or ridicule that might follow from an introduction to Consuela's family. It is implied that he fears such a meeting would expose the implausible age gap in their relationship. Ultimately, Kepesh limits their relationship to the physical instead of embarking upon any deeper arrangement.

In the end, Kepesh is destroyed by his indecisiveness, the fear of senescence, his lust and jealousy. Consuela never subsequently finds a lover who can show the same level of devotion to her body as Kepesh had. After some years of estrangement, she asks him to take nude photographs of her because she will be losing one of her breasts to a life-saving mastectomy.

Most editions display a cover picture, Le grand nu (1919) by Amedeo Modigliani. In the novel, Consuela sends Kepesh a postcard depicting Le grand nu, and Kepesh surmises that the figure in the painting is her alter ego.

== Film adaptation ==
The Isabel Coixet film Elegy, starring Penélope Cruz, Ben Kingsley, Dennis Hopper and Patricia Clarkson, which premiered at the 2008 Berlinale, is based on The Dying Animal.
