= Laurel Awards =

Former American cinema award

- Country: United States
- Presented by: Motion Picture Exhibitor (magazine)
- First award: 1948
- Final award: 1971

The Laurel Awards were American cinema awards that honored films, actors, producers, directors, and composers. This award was created by the Motion Picture Exhibitor magazine, and ran from 1948 to 1971 (with the exception of 1969).

The winners of Laurel Awards were determined by both American and Canadian film buyers. After the vote, the results were published in the magazine and each winner was given a golden plaque.

== Awardees ==
=== Best Picture ===
- Patton: 1971, not awarded any other year

=== Best Action Drama ===
- Butch Cassidy and the Sundance Kid: 1970, not awarded any other year

=== Best Action Performance ===
- John Wayne: True Grit: 1970, not awarded any other year

=== Best Female New Face ===
- Ali MacGraw: Goodbye, Columbus: 1970, not awarded any other year

=== Best Dramatic Performance (Female) ===
- Claudette Colbert: 1950
- Jane Wyman: 1951
- Joan Crawford: 1952
- Deborah Kerr: 1953
- Grace Kelly: 1954
- Susan Hayward: 1955
- Ingrid Bergman: 1956
- Elizabeth Taylor: 1957

=== Best Dramatic Performance (Male) ===
- Rod Steiger: In the Heat of the Night 1968

=== Best Male Performance ===
- James Stewart: The Stratton Story 1950

=== Best Female Performance ===
- June Allyson: The Stratton Story 1950

=== Top Female Star ===
- Doris Day: 1958, 1959, 1960, 1961, 1962, 1963, 1964
- Elizabeth Taylor: 1965, 1966
- Julie Andrews: 1967, 1968
- Katharine Hepburn: 1970, 1971

=== Top Male Star ===
- Rock Hudson: 1958, 1959, 1960, 1962, 1963
- Burt Lancaster: 1961
- Cary Grant: 1964, 1966
- Jack Lemmon: 1965, 1967
- Paul Newman: 1968, 1970
- Dustin Hoffman: 1971

=== Top Male Personality ===
- Peter O'Toole: Lawrence of Arabia 1963

=== Top Producer / Director ===
- Cecil B. DeMille: 1949, 1950, 1951, 1952, 1953, 1954, 1955, 1956, 1957, 1958
- Alfred Hitchcock: 1959, 1960, 1961, 1962, 1964, 1966, 1970, 1971
- Billy Wilder: 1963
- Mervyn LeRoy: 1965
- Robert Wise: 1967, 1968

=== Top Director ===
- Fred Zinnemann: 1958, 1959, 1961, 1962, 1963, 1964
- Vincente Minnelli: 1960
- George Cukor: 1965
- David Lean: 1966
- Henry Hathaway: 1967
- Norman Jewison: 1968
- Mike Nichols: 1970, 1971

=== Musical Performance, Male ===
- Elvis Presley: 1966
