= My Life as a Man =

1974 novel by Philip Roth

My Life As A Man
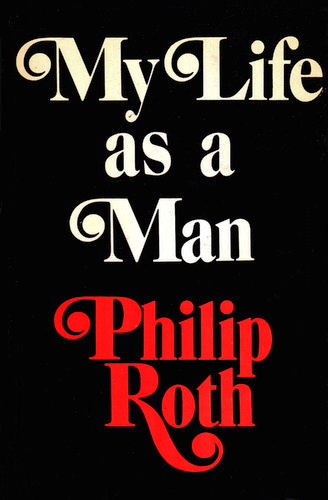
- First edition cover
- Author: Philip Roth
- Language: English
- Genre: Novel
- Publisher: Holt, Rinehart and Winston
- Publication date: 1974
- Publication place: United States
- Media type: Print (hardback & paperback)
- Pages: 330 pp
- ISBN: 0-030-12646-0
- OCLC: 814590

My Life as a Man (1974) is American writer Philip Roth's seventh novel.

== Summary ==
The work is split into two sections: the first section, "Useful Fictions," consisting of two short stories, titled "Salad Days" and "Courting Disaster (or "Serious in the Fifties"), about a character named Nathan Zuckerman, and the second section, "My True Story," which takes the form of a first-person memoir by Peter Tarnopol, a Jewish writer who authored the two stories in the first section.

== Themes ==
My Life as a Man is the first of Roth's work that tackles the issue of the writer's relationship to his work, a theme he would develop in subsequent novels, particularly Operation Shylock. In his autobiography, Roth reveals that much of Tarnopol's life is based on his own experiences; for example, Roth's destructive marriage to Margaret Martinson, which is portrayed through Tarnopol's relationship with the character of Maureen.

== Reception ==
In The New York Times Book Review, critic Morris Dickstein compared the novel to its predecessor Portnoy's Complaint:

No writer, not even Mailer or Lowell, has contributed more to the confessional climate than Philip Roth. Thanks to "Portnoy's Complaint" a good slice of contemporary fiction seems to come verbatim from the writer's own hours on the couch. This would be a dubious distinction had Roth's book not also boldly altered the tone of our confessional writing, most of which had been lugubrious and realistic, smothered in angst and high-seriousness. Reaching back instead to the raunchy, delirious autobiographical manner of Henry Miller and Céline--indeed, perpetuating an unseemly imitation of the latter's great "Death on the Installment Plan"--Roth pitched his anguish in such a low comic strain that the effect was irresistible. If there has been a funnier novel in the last 10 years, or one that exploits sex, psychoanalysis, and the "family romance" more brilliantly, I don't know what it could be.

...Like Rousseau's "Confessions" and its modern progeny, "My Life as a Man" is reckless in inviting us to review the man rather than the writer: that's part of its appeal. To get the story out Roth is willing to look not only ignoble and self-centered, but also foolish, helpless, even a little ugly (as in Peter's final satisfaction at his wife's death). But if the personal-confessional mode highlights Roth's limitations it also returns him to the day-to-day carnival of human folly that he can describe so ringingly, so comically, even as it goes on tormenting him.
