= Sabbath's Theater =

1995 novel by Philip Roth

- Front cover of the first edition
- Author: Philip Roth
- Cover artist: Otto Dix, Sailor and girl, 1925
- Language: English
- Publisher: Houghton Mifflin
- Publication date: 1995
- Publication place: United States
- Pages: 451
- ISBN: 0-395-73982-9
- OCLC: 31970961

Sabbath's Theater is a novel by Philip Roth about the exploits of 64-year-old Mickey Sabbath. It won the 1995 U.S. National Book Award for Fiction. The cover is a detail of Sailor and Girl (1925) by German painter Otto Dix.

== Summary and themes ==
Mickey Sabbath (modeled after American Jewish painter R.B. Kitaj) is an unproductive, out-of-work, former puppeteer with a strong affinity for prostitutes, adultery, and the casual sexual encounter. Sabbath takes great pleasure in his status as the prototypical "dirty old man." He takes an equal pleasure in manipulating the people around him, primarily women—in a sense, they play the same role as his puppets. The loss of a decades-long wingman—the equally depraved Drenka—precipitates a crisis in a life he has long considered an utter failure. Sabbath wonders whether he should simply take his own life, thereby heeding the advice of the ghost of his departed mother, a frequent visitor who urges suicide as the fitting end for his failed life.

== Reception ==
Literary critic Harold Bloom has declared Sabbath's Theater Roth's "masterwork." Prominent literary critic James Wood told The Morning News, "I am a great fan of Sabbath’s Theater, it was an extraordinary book." New York Times critic Michiko Kakutani found it hard to finish and "distasteful and disingenuous".

It won the National Book Award for fiction—thirty-five years after Roth's debut novel Goodbye Columbus won the same award (1960). It was also a finalist for the 1996 Pulitzer Prize.

After Roth's passing, The New York Times asked several prominent authors to name their favorite Roth book. Claire Messud picked Sabbath's Theater, writing: "The novel, outrageous when it was first published is all but inconceivable today; which is part of what makes it literarily important. Roth fearlessly embraces the ugliness of the aging degenerate, with Dostoevskian zeal. He manages to do so with such wit and in such pyrotechnic prose that this reader, at least, doesn’t hurl the book across the room."

== Stage version ==
In 2023, the Signature Theatre Company put on a stage version of Sabbath's Theater at the Romulus Linney Courtyard Theatre of the Pershing Square Signature Center, an off-Broadway theater. The play was adapted from Roth's novel by Ariel Levy and John Turturro, with Turturro starring as Mickey Sabbath. The play was directed by Jo Bonney.
