= Letting Go (novel) =

1962 novel by Philip Roth

- First edition
- Author: Philip Roth
- Cover artist: Howard Morris
- Language: English
- Publisher: Random House
- Publication date: June 12, 1962
- Publication place: USA
- Media type: Print (Hardcover)
- Pages: 630
- ISBN: 0-679-76417-8
- OCLC: 36510929
- Dewey Decimal: 813/.54 21
- LC Class: PS3568.O855 L4 1997
- Preceded by: Goodbye, Columbus
- Followed by: When She Was Good

Letting Go is a 1962 novel by American author Philip Roth, marking his debut into full-length fiction following the success of his novella collection Goodbye, Columbus (1959). Set in the 1950s, the novel explores the emotional and intellectual struggles of Gabe Wallach, a graduate student in literature, as he navigates relationships, ambition, and moral dilemmas in postwar America. Through its depiction of academic life, romantic entanglements, and interfaith tensions, Letting Go engages with the social constraints and cultural expectations of the Eisenhower era, particularly around class, religion, and sexuality. Roth employs a dual narrative mode—alternating between first-person and omniscient perspectives—to highlight the limits of self-understanding and the complexities of interpersonal perception. The novel was highly praised by fellow writers, Orville Prescott and Elizabeth Hardwick. Letting Go has often been retrospectively overshadowed by Roth’s later fiction, especially Portnoy’s Complaint (1969), which critics have hailed as a defining moment in his early career.

== Plot summary ==
Gabe Wallach is a graduate student in literature at the University of Iowa and an ardent admirer of Henry James. Fearing that the intellectual demands of a life in literature might leave him cloistered, Gabe seeks solace in what he thinks of as "the world of feeling". Following the death of his mother at the opening of the novel, Gabe befriends his fellow graduate student Paul Herz.

The novel Letting Go is divided into seven (7) sections:

1. "Debts and Sorrows"

Having served in the Korean War after college, Gabe Wallach is finishing his military service in Oklahoma when he receives a letter his mother wrote to him from her death bed. After reading the letter Wallach places it in The Portrait of a Lady by Henry James. The narrative then skips forward to a year later when Wallach is working on a graduate degree in literature at the University of Iowa. Wallach lends his copy of The Portrait of a Lady to a fellow graduate student, Paul Herz. Later Wallach realizes that he left the letter from his mother in the pages of the book and in his attempt to retrieve the book he meets Paul's wife, Libby. Gabe learns from Libby that Paul is teaching classes at another school and realizes how poor the Herzs are. He drives Libby to where Paul's car has broken down on a trip from this second school and witnesses the first of many arguments between Paul and Libby. Libby also reveals to Gabe that she read the letter from his now-deceased mother. This is the beginning of the several instances where the characters begin to imagine the life of the other and believe that they understand it completely based on very little actual evidence.

During this opening section, Gabe also communicates with his father. Gabe, as narrator, paints his father as a weak and needy man although he is a successful dentist in New York. During phone conversations Gabe's father nearly begs him to return home and questions his son about why he would go so far from New York to graduate school.

Alone with a very sick Libby, Gabe kisses her once. Gabe also has a relationship with Marge Howells, an undergraduate from a well-to-do WASP family who is openly rebelling from her parents. While Gabe is in New York visiting his father, he breaks up with Marge over the telephone. He asks Paul to help move Marge out of his apartment.

Gabe gets a job as an English teacher at the University of Chicago. At a party, he meets Martha Reganhart, a waitress and a divorced mother of two children. When the university has a vacancy, Gabe recommends Paul Herz, who takes the job.

2. "Paul Loves Libby"

In section two, Roth tells the story of Paul and Libby's courtship and the early years of their marriage. They meet while both of them are students at Cornell University. Paul is the only child of Jewish parents in Brooklyn, NY. Paul's father has failed at a number of businesses but Paul is recognized as a smart and gifted child. Libby is the child of Catholic parents. Neither Paul nor Libby is very serious about their religious backgrounds and have no problem courting each other because of it; however, both sets of parents are upset by this. Over Christmas break Paul tells his parents about the engagement. They react poorly and end up convincing Paul to speak with his two uncles. One of them, his Uncle Asher is a lifelong bachelor whom most of the family pities because they don't think he can find someone to marry. Paul, however, learns that Asher just does not want to be married. Asher has had a long series of sexual encounters while single and has no desire to be married. The blunt language of Asher is the first, and perhaps the most dominant, example in this novel of the frank sexual dialogue and discussion that Roth would later become renowned and notorious for.

Faced with many conflicting opinions, none of which he really wants to listen to, Paul decides to go ahead and elope with Libby on Christmas Eve. Soon after their marriage, the couple learns that Libby's father will no longer support her. Eventually they end up in Michigan, both taking a break from school while they work to save up money. They live in a small room in a boarding house mostly occupied by seniors. Libby becomes pregnant and at work one day, Paul hurts himself in the factory. He tells the factory doctor that his mind was distracted by his pregnant wife. The doctor responds by giving him the name and number of a doctor who will perform abortions. After much discussion and a few arguments, Libby gets an abortion.

3. "The Power of Thanksgiving"

4. "Three Women"

5. "Children and Men"

6. "The Mad Crusader"

7. "Letting Go."

== Themes ==
Much of the tension in the novel comes from the conflict between the characters and the social constraints of the 1950s. Romantic relationships are most heavily scrutinized. Paul Herz and his wife Libby become estranged from their families because one is Jewish and the other is Christian (religion reemerges as an issue towards the end of the novel).

Social class also plays a role, especially between Gabe and his girlfriend for much of the novel, Martha, who is a divorced mother of two struggling to make ends meet. Martha repeatedly fears that Gabe will leave her. Gabe, at one point, tells a fellow University of Chicago faculty member that he should marry her, but he ultimately flees back to Martha.

Throughout the novel, the characters are confronted with the sometimes-thin line separating sexual promiscuity from sanctity in the eyes of the predominant culture. Abortion, divorce, remarriage and adoption affect the lives and psyches of Roth's subjects as the plot unfolds.

One remarkable stylistic trait of the novel is the use of two narrative modes. Parts of the story are narrated by Gabe Wallach, in the first person. Other parts of the story are narrated using an omniscient narrator. The contrast between what Gabe understands about the events in the story and the other characters' viewpoints on different events creates deeper interest in their misunderstandings, conflicts, and goals. It also draws the reader to speculate upon his own understanding of the characters' actions and motives.

== Reception ==
Critical reception of Letting Go has often been shaped by retrospective comparisons to Roth’s later work, particularly Portnoy’s Complaint (1969), which is widely regarded as a pivotal moment in his early career. This contrast was notably advanced by Roth’s friend Ted Solotaroff, editor of the New American Review, who published excerpts from Portnoy’s Complaint and, in a 1969 essay, reflected on their shared experiences as PhD students at the University of Chicago in the late 1950s. Solotaroff linked the thematic and stylistic elements of Letting Go to the prevailing literary conventions of that period, characterizing the novel as emblematic of the “age of conformity” at the close of the Eisenhower era and the restrictive academic ideals they had encountered.

The novel was praised by Orville Prescott for The New York Times in October 1962: "Letting Go" is further proof of Mr. Roth's astonishing talent. This is a clumsily constructed novel, but a morbidly fascinating one. Its emotional tension is nerve-racking, its psychological insight convincing. Mr. Roth has a phenomenal ear for colloquial dialogue. He is an effective storyteller, although he prefers to tell many separate stories rather than one unified story. He is as sure and incisive with fleeting minor characters as he is with his principals. And he has absolutely no taste or sense of restraint at all." Prescott continued: "In addition to being a long and intimate study of its four unforgettable principals, "Letting Go" is a harshly satirical account of many other characters in many different walks of life. Mr. Roth is amusing and touching and shocking by turns."

Elizabeth Hardwick also wrote a positive review of the novel for Harper's Magazine: "Roth’s Letting Go is very interesting and has the same command of amusing idiom that made his Goodbye, Columbus so often delightful. It is another, in part, of those academic novels... Roth’s is a rich book, full of incident, and genuinely novelistic complications. It is wry and sad and even in its most desolating scenes somehow amusing... Roth reminds one a bit of Saul Bellow in this book, even if he is less intellectual and experimental. A series of Thanksgiving visits to New York are brilliant; the dialogue is unusually good and Letting Go seems in every way a book worthy of Roth’s first promise.

Irving Feldman wrote a mixed review about the novel for Commentary. Feldman compared it to Flaubert's Sentimental Education and praised the character of Herz, whilst criticizing the depiction of Wallach's character.

== Film adaptations ==
During the 1960s, two proposed film adaptations were developed but ultimately abandoned. In 1964, producer Martin Poll and director Harvey Hart obtained the film rights; however, the project was never realized. A subsequent attempt in 1969 by American International Pictures, with Hart again slated to direct, similarly failed to proceed.
