= Shop Talk =

- First edition
- Author: Philip Roth
- Subject: Writing
- Publisher: Houghton Mifflin
- Publication date: September 25, 2001
- Pages: 160
- ISBN: 0-618-15314-4
- OCLC: 46683862
- Dewey Decimal: 809/.045 21
- LC Class: PN452 .R68 2001

Shop Talk: A Writer and His Colleagues and Their Work is a collection of previously published interviews with important 20th-century writers by novelist Philip Roth. Among the writers interviewed are Primo Levi, Aharon Appelfeld, Ivan Klima, Isaac Bashevis Singer, Milan Kundera, and Edna O'Brien. In addition, the book contains a discussion with Mary McCarthy about Roth's novel The Counterlife and a New Yorker essay on Saul Bellow. Roth's trip to Israel to interview Appelfeld inspired his novel Operation Shylock.

== Table of contents ==
- Conversation in New York with Isaac Bashevis Singer about Bruno Schulz, from The New York Times Book Review, 1976
- Conversation in London and Connecticut with Milan Kundera, from The New York Times Book Review, 1980
- Conversation in London with Edna O'Brien, from The New York Times Book Review, 1984
- Pictures of Malamud, from The New York Times Book Review, 1986
- A Man Saved by His Skills. Conversation in Turin with Primo Levi, from The New York Times Book Review, 12 ottobre 1986
- Conversation in Jerusalem with Aharon Appelfeld, from The New York Times Book Review, 1988
- Pictures of Guston, from Vanity Fair, 1989
- Conversation in Prague with Ivan Klíma, from The New York Review of Books, 1990
- An Exchange with Mary McCarthy, from The New Yorker, 1998
- Rereading Saul Bellow, from The New Yorker, 2000

== Reception ==
Author Daniel Handler, reviewing the book in the San Francisco Chronicle, called it "hodgepodge", with conversations that "fall flat" and were sometimes " vague and unsatisfying". On the other hand, Nicholas Lezard, in The Guardian, found that "Roth asks all the right questions", with the answers being "consistently enlightening".
