= When She Was Good =

1967 novel by Philip Roth

- First edition
- Author: Philip Roth
- Language: English
- Publisher: Random House
- Publication date: May 12, 1967
- Publication place: United States
- Media type: Print (hardcover)
- Pages: 306
- OCLC: 31045007
- Dewey Decimal: 813/.54 20
- LC Class: PS3568.O855 W46 1995
- Preceded by: Letting Go
- Followed by: Portnoy's Complaint

When She Was Good is a 1967 novel by Philip Roth. It is Roth's only novel with a female protagonist. Set in a small town in the American Midwest during the 1940s and '50s, the novel depicts the life of a moralistic young woman, Lucy Nelson.

== Plot ==
Below are the events of the novel written in chronological order:

Willard Nelson awaits his profligate son-in-law, Duane's, return to the Nelson household. As he does so, he reflects on several events that have occurred throughout his life, including Duane's descent into alcoholism, brief recovery many years later, and subsequent relapse, as well as several scenes involving Willard's deceased granddaughter, Duane's daughter Lucy. Willard spots Duane and the narrative shifts to the 1940s.

Unhappy with her home life due to her alcoholic father, Duane's, treatment of her mother, Lucy Nelson starts making plans to convert to Catholicism, thinking that she will find solace in the religion. After she calls the police on her father when witnessing him beating her mother, a local priest, Father Frank, implies that Lucy must repent for betraying her family, prompting her to lose interest in Catholicism.

In her senior year of high school, Lucy befriends a girl named Eleanor Sowerby, and begins dating the girl's cousin, Roy Bassart. Lucy resents Eleanor's mother because she believes that she looks down on her due to her social class, but comes to regret her animosity when Eleanor confides in her about her father, Julian's, infidelity, which she has just discovered. Lucy then comes to the conclusion that she has only been projecting her own insecurities onto Mrs. Sowerby.

Roy pressures Lucy into having sex with him; afterwards, when she is at college, Lucy experiences bouts of dizziness and vomiting, and after a visit to the campus doctor, realizes that Roy has impregnated her. Because she refuses her father's offer to pay for an abortion, Lucy is forced to drop out of college to raise her child. At one point during her pregnancy, Lucy is staying with her family and refuses to let her drunken father into the house. Consequently, he does not return until many years have passed, although it is revealed that he and his wife have, during the former's long absence, been corresponding via letters, which enrages Lucy's grandmother, who wants her daughter to divorce her husband and marry a kindly older man.

Lucy ultimately marries Roy and though she loves her child, is unhappy with her immature husband and her role as a housewife, leading to frequent outbursts and eventually a mental breakdown that prompts her husband to leave with their child, who has become afraid of his mother. Lucy, who in the meantime, has been impregnated by Roy once again, drives to her in-laws house and demands that her child be given back to her. After being verbally abused by Roy's uncle, Julian Sowerby, Lucy retaliates by exposing his infidelity, only to find that Irene Sowerby is already aware of his liaisons, and is seemingly indifferent to them. Unsuccessful, Lucy eventually wanders out into the cold and freezes to death. Some time afterwards, Duane returns to the Nelson residence after being arrested for theft at a casino that he had taken a job at.

== Reception ==
In The New York Times, critic and writer Wilfrid Sheed observed Roth remains a comic novelist: “His best scenes are still his lightest, the ones you aren't looking for.” Sheed continued, “At the same time, it should be emphasized that ‘When She Was Good,’ both in its sustained theme and its detail work, is a step in class above most recent novels: up on the ledge, in fact, where stringent standards set in. Roth is a serious writer, willing to turn his face against fashion and the expected. . . Roth is one of our few important writers concerning whose future it is possible to feel anything like real curiosity.”

In his review of the novel for the Chicago Tribune, Lester Goran praised the novel as a powerful Dreiserian tragedy.

== Theme ==
Author Alix Kates Shulman observed in The Atlantic (July 1972) that the novel, “though widely hailed as the definitive portrait of the Great American Bitch, seems to recognize, even to understand, the Middle-American girl’s plight—and yet still manages to blame her for the consequences.” Roth biographer Bernard F. Rodgers, Jr. argues that Lucy Nelson represents more than merely a “case study” of a female social type, but introduces a “fabulistic element” to reveal “the larger society of which Lucy is a part.”

Writing in Literary Guild Magazine (July 1967), Roth cautions that though none of Lucy’s “horrific small-mindedness is by any means indigenous to our country…there is much that American readers will find altogether ordinary and recognizable.”

[T]here is a strong American inclination to respond to life like Lucy Nelson—an inclination to reduce the complexities and mysteries of living to the most simple-minded and childish issues of right and wrong. How deeply this perverse moralistic bent has become embedded in the national character and affected our national life is, I realize, a matter of debate…What destroys Lucy (some readers would hold) has nothing whatsoever to do with the rest of us. I am of a different opinion.

== Sources ==
- Rodgers, Jr., Bernard F.. 1978. Philip Roth. Twaynes Publishers, G. K. Hall & Co., Boston, Mass. ISBN 0-8057-7249-9
- Roth, Philip. 1967. “Philip Roth Tells About When She Was Good.” Literary Guild Magazine, July 1967. Unpaginated.
- Shulman,Alix Kates. 1972. “The War in the Back Seat.” The Atlantic, July 1972. https://www.theatlantic.com/magazine/archive/1972/07/the-war-in-the-back-seat/662751/ Accessed 04 September, 2026.

== Bibliography ==
- Roth, Philip. When She Was Good. New York, Random House, 1967.
