= Goodbye, Columbus (film) =

1969 film by Larry Peerce

- Theatrical release poster
- Directed by: Larry Peerce
- Screenplay by: Arnold Schulman
- Based on: Goodbye, Columbus by Philip Roth
- Produced by: Stanley R. Jaffe
- Starring: Richard Benjamin; Jack Klugman; Nan Martin; Ali MacGraw
- Cinematography: Gerald Hirschfeld
- Edited by: Ralph Rosenblum
- Music by: Charles Fox
- Production company: Willow Tree
- Distributed by: Paramount Pictures
- Release date: April 3, 1969
- Running time: 102 minutes
- Country: United States
- Language: English
- Budget: $1.5 million
- Box office: $22.9 million

Goodbye, Columbus is a 1969 American romantic comedy-drama film directed by Larry Peerce from a screenplay by Arnold Schulman, based on the 1959 novella by Philip Roth. The film stars Richard Benjamin, Jack Klugman, Nan Martin, and Ali MacGraw.

The story's title alludes to a phonograph record played by the brother of MacGraw's character, nostalgically recalling his athletic career at Ohio State in Columbus. The film was essentially MacGraw's film debut, as she had previously had only a bit part in the previous year's A Lovely Way to Die. The screenplay won the Writers Guild of America Award.

== Plot ==
Neil Klugman is an intelligent, working-class army veteran and a graduate of Rutgers University who lives with his aunt and uncle in the Bronx and works as a library clerk. He falls for Brenda Patimkin, a wealthy Radcliffe student who is home for the summer. They meet by the swimming pool at Old Oaks Country Club in Purchase, New York, a private club that Neil visits as a guest of his cousin Doris. Neil phones Brenda and asks her on a date. She does not remember him, but agrees. He waits as she finishes a tennis match that ends only when it gets too dark to play.

They face obstacles from Brenda's family (particularly her mother), due to differences in class and assimilation into the American mainstream. Brenda's family are nouveau riche, their money having come from the successful plumbing supply business owned and run by her father. Brenda herself is old enough to remember "being poor". Other conflicts include propriety and issues related to premarital sex and contraception.

After a few dates, Brenda persuades her father to allow Neil to stay with them for two weeks, angering her mother, who feels that she should have been asked instead. While Neil enjoys being able to sneak into Brenda's room at night, he has misgivings over her entitled outlook, echoed by her spoiled and petulant younger sister, and her naïve brother Ron, who misses the hero worship he enjoyed as a star basketball player at Ohio State University, frequently playing a record album of his final championship game. Neil is astonished when Brenda reveals that she does not take birth control pills or use any other precautions, angrily waving off Neil's concerns. He prepares to leave, but she persuades him to stay by agreeing to obtain a diaphragm.

At the end of his visit, Neil attends Ron's wedding to Harriet, his college sweetheart from Ohio. Brenda returns to Radcliffe in the fall, keeping in touch by telephone. She invites Neil to come up to spend a weekend at a Boston hotel. However, once they are in the hotel room, Brenda tells Neil she just received letters telling her that her mother found her diaphragm and that her parents know about their affair. They argue, with Neil questioning why she left it to be found unless she wanted it discovered. Siding with her parents, Brenda ends the affair as abruptly as she allowed it to commence. Neil walks out of the hotel, leaving her crying in the room.

== Cast ==
- Richard Benjamin as Neil Klugman
- Ali MacGraw as Brenda Patimkin
- Jack Klugman as Ben Patimkin
- Nan Martin as Mrs. Ben Patimkin
- Michael Meyers as Ron Patimkin
- Lori Shelle as Julie Patimkin
- Monroe Arnold as Uncle Leo
- Kay Cummings as Doris Klugman
- Sylvie Strause as Aunt Gladys
- Royce Wallace as Carlotta, the African-American cook and housekeeper at the Patimkin home
- Mari Gorman as Laura Simpson Sockaloe (Simp)
- Michael Nouri as Don Farber (uncredited)

== Production ==
Arnold Schulman was approached by Stanley Jaffe to adapt the novella for scale and a percentage of the profits. The writer agreed and called making the film "altogether a perfectly wonderful experience from beginning to end... we worked together, like a play—me and [the director] Larry Peerce and the cast and Stanley."

Goodbye, Columbus was shot in Old Oaks Country Club, Westchester County, New York, the Bronx in New York City, and Cambridge, Massachusetts. The interior library scenes were filmed in Gould Memorial Library on the campus of Bronx Community College and the exterior library scenes were filmed at Yonkers Public Library in Westchester County. The film was shot on location on the campus of Radcliffe College in Cambridge, Massachusetts. Exterior theatre scenes were filmed at Colony Theatre and Pix Theatre in White Plains, NY, among others.

The film was the only acting role for Michael Meyers, who later became a physician. He was cast as Ron, the brother of Ali MacGraw's character, after director Larry Peerce "discovered" him at a wedding in Manhattan's Plaza Hotel. In 1976, he published a memoir about his involvement in the film and his subsequent medical career, Goodbye Columbus, Hello Medicine. Meyers drowned in the ocean on September 14, 2009, in Los Angeles County at the age of 63.

== Soundtrack ==
A vinyl LP record of the film's score was released in 1969 by Warner Bros. Records and a compact disc was released in 2006 by Collector's Choice Music.

Three songs in the soundtrack were written and performed by members of the Association: "Goodbye, Columbus" (Jim Yester), "It's Gotta Be Real" (Larry Ramos), and "So Kind to Me" (Terry Kirkman).

== Reception ==
=== Box office ===
Goodbye, Columbus earned an estimated $10.5 million in theatrical rentals at the North American box office, making it one of the most popular films of the year.

=== Critical response ===
Variety magazine lauded the film upon its release, writing, "This adaptation of Philip Roth's National Book Award-winning novella is sometimes a joy in striking a boisterous mood, and otherwise handling the action. Castwise the feature excels. Richard Benjamin as the boy, a librarian after serving in the army, and Ali MacGraw, making her screen bow as the daughter of wealthy and socially-conscious parents, offer fresh portrayals seasoned with rich humor. Their romance develops swiftly after their meeting at a country-club pool."

The New York Times' film critic, Vincent Canby, liked the film but was annoyed that it strayed from Roth's work. Canby wrote:

Thus, at its center, Goodbye, Columbus is sharp and honest. However, the further they are removed from the main situation, the more the subsidiary characters, lightly sketched in the novella, become overstuffed, blintz-shaped caricatures. Jack Klugman and Nan Martin, as Brenda's parents, are very nice, but Michael Meyers, as her huge, empty-headed brother ('so exceedingly polite,' Mr. Roth observed in the novella, 'that it seemed to be some affliction of those over six foot three') borders on a cartoon figure. Also, I somehow resent the really vulgar manners that Mr. Peerce allows his middle-class Jews—especially at an elaborate wedding reception—not because of any particular bias, but because it is gross moviemaking. These reservations, however, become academic. Goodbye, Columbus is so rich with understanding in more important ways that it is a thing of real and unusual pleasure.

Critic Dennis Schwartz praised the film as well: "Philip Roth's prize-winning novella, a scathing satire of a nouveau riche Jewish family, has been brilliantly adapted for the screen by Arnold Schulman (received an Academy nomination) and directed by Larry Peerce (son of the great operatic tenor Jan Peerce). Somehow it slipped under the radar and as far as I'm concerned is both funnier and more perceptive than even The Graduate, an earlier drama about young adults."

On the review aggregator website Rotten Tomatoes, 93% of 14 critics' reviews are positive.

=== Accolades ===
Award	Category	Recipient(s)	Result
Academy Awards	Best Screenplay – Based on Material from Another Medium	Arnold Schulman	Nominated
British Academy Film Awards	Best Actor in a Supporting Role	Jack Klugman	Nominated
British Academy Film Awards	Best Screenplay	Arnold Schulman	Nominated
British Academy Film Awards	Most Promising Newcomer to Leading Film Roles	Ali MacGraw	Nominated
Directors Guild of America Awards	Outstanding Directorial Achievement in Motion Pictures	Larry Peerce	Nominated
Golden Globe Awards	Best Motion Picture – Musical or Comedy	Goodbye, Columbus	Nominated
Golden Globe Awards	Best Original Song – Motion Picture	"Goodbye, Columbus" – Charles Fox and Jim Yester	Nominated
Golden Globe Awards	Most Promising Newcomer – Female	Ali MacGraw	Won
Laurel Awards	Top Comedy	Goodbye, Columbus	Won
Laurel Awards	Top Male Dramatic Performance	Richard Benjamin	5th Place
Laurel Awards	Top Male New Face	Richard Benjamin	4th Place
Laurel Awards	Top Female New Face	Ali MacGraw	Won
Writers Guild of America Awards	Best Comedy Adapted from Another Medium	Arnold Schulman	Won

== See also ==
- List of American films of 1969

== Notes ==
- McGilligan, Patrick (1997). "Arnold Schulman: Nothing but Regrets". Backstory 3: Interviews with Screenwriters of the 1960s. Berkeley: University of California Press. p. 298-327. ISBN 978-0520204270.
