= Our Gang (novel) =

Novel by Philip Roth

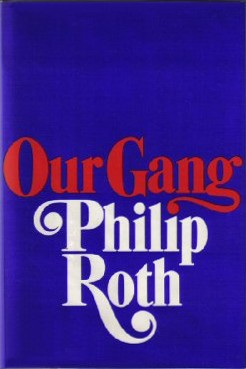
- First edition
- Author: Philip Roth
- Language: English
- Publisher: Random House
- Publication date: 1971
- Publication place: United States
- Media type: Print (hardcover)
- Pages: 200
- ISBN: 039447886X
- OCLC: 190674

Our Gang (1971) is Philip Roth's fifth novel. A marked departure from his previous book, the popular Portnoy's Complaint, Our Gang is a political satire written in the form of a closet drama. Centered on the character of "Trick E. Dixon", a caricature of then-President Richard Nixon, the book takes its cue from an actual quote from Nixon:

From personal and religious beliefs I consider abortions an unacceptable form of population control. Furthermore, unrestricted abortion policies, or abortion on-demand, I cannot square with my personal belief in the sanctity of human life—including the life of the yet unborn. For, surely, the unborn have rights also, recognized in law, recognized even in principles expounded by the United Nations.

Roth was inspired to write Our Gang by Nixon making this statement on the same week he ordered William Calley's release from prison to house arrest. As the book is written entirely as dialogue, Roth uses stage directions, such as "impish endearing smile", when Dixon is talking.

== Summary ==
The book is six chapters long. Chapter one is entitled "Tricky comforts a troubled citizen". In the chapter, the citizen in question is concerned with William Calley's killing of 22 Vietnamese villagers at My Lai, but he is "seriously troubled by the possibility that Lieutenant Calley may have committed an abortion." Throughout the chapter, Dixon defends the notion that Calley may have killed a pregnant woman, covering many factors; If the pregnant woman was "showing" or not, if Calley could have communicated with her, if he really did know she was pregnant, whether the woman asked Calley to give her an abortion, etc. Dixon manages to defend Calley well until the citizen asks if Calley could have given her an abortion against her will, as "an outright form of murder", and Dixon gives the following answer, which is supposed to reflect his background as a lawyer and his hard-to-pin-down nature:

Well, of course, that is a very iffy question, isn't it? What we lawyers call a hypothetical instance—isn't it? If you will remember, we are only "supposing" there to have been a pregnant woman in the ditch at My Lai to begin with. Suppose there "wasn't" a pregnant woman in that ditch—which, in fact, seems from all evidence to have been the case. We are then involved in a totally academic discussion.

In chapter two, entitled "Tricky holds a press conference", Dixon takes questions from reporters with names to suit their respective personalities. The reporters are called Mr. Asslick (who, as his name suggests, "sucks up" to the President), Mr. Daring (who poses, as suggested, the more daring suggestions in the style of investigative journalism), Mr. Respectful (who acts rather meekly compared to some of his compatriots), Mr. Shrewd (who, being slightly more daring than Mr. Daring, suggests President Dixon may be giving voting rights to the unborn for purely political reasons), Miss Charming (the typical female reporter often stereotyped in media as 'charming' indeed), Mr. Practical (concerned not with the politics of the situation, but the when and the how much of the situation).

From this starting point, Roth satirizes Nixon and his cabinet—particularly Henry Kissinger ("Highbrow coach") and Spiro Agnew ("Vice President-what's-his-name")—as Tricky tries to deny that he supports sexual intercourse, provoking a group of Boy Scouts to riot in Washington, D.C., in which three are shot. Tricky tries to pin the blame on baseball player Curt Flood and the nation of Denmark, managing to obliterate the city of Copenhagen in the process. After an operation to remove his upper lip sweat gland, he is eventually assassinated by being drowned in a giant baggie filled with water, his corpse in the fetal position. Tricky ends the novel in Hell, campaigning against Satan for the position of Devil.

== Reception ==
In The New York Times, Dwight Macdonald described the book as "far-fetched, unfair, tasteless, disturbing, logical, coarse and very funny" and "in short, a masterpiece". On the other hand, The New Republic compared the novel to the Barbara Garson play MacBird! while calling it "tasteless and dreadful".

Nixon himself discussed the book with his Chief of Staff H. R. Haldeman, who called it "ridiculous" and "sickening". Their conversations were preserved on Nixon's White House tapes.
