= Everyman (novel) =

2006 novel by Philip Roth

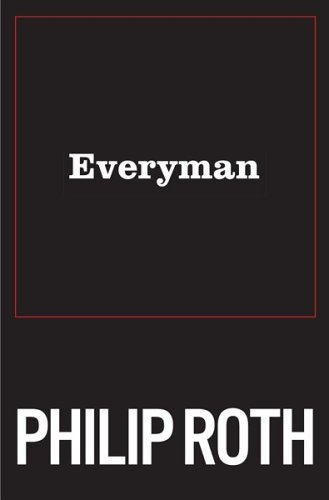
- First edition cover
- Author: Philip Roth
- Language: English
- Genre: Novel
- Published: May 9, 2006 Houghton Mifflin
- Publication place: United States
- Pages: 182 pp
- ISBN: 978-0-618-73516-7

Everyman is a novel by Philip Roth, published by Houghton Mifflin in May 2006. It won the PEN/Faulkner Award for Fiction in 2007. It is Roth's third novel to receive the prize.

== Plot ==
The book begins at the funeral of its protagonist. The remainder of the book, which ends with his death, looks mournfully back on episodes from his life, including his childhood, where he and his older brother, Howie, worked in his father's shop, Everyman's Jewelry Store. He has been married three times, with two sons from his first marriage who resent him for leaving their mother, and one daughter from his second marriage who treats him with kindness and compassion, though he divorced her mother after beginning an affair with a 24-year-old Danish model, who subsequently became his third wife. Having divorced her as well, he has moved in his old age to a retirement community at the New Jersey shore, where he lives alone and attempts to paint, having passed up a career as an artist early in his life to work in advertising in order to support himself and his family. The book traces the protagonist's feelings as he gets increasingly old and sick, and his reflections of his own past, which has included his share of misdeeds and mistakes, as he ponders his impending death.

The unnamed everyman, while an ordinary man and not a famous novelist, has much in common with Philip Roth; he is born, like Roth, in 1933; he grows up in Elizabeth, six miles away from Roth's native Newark; and he recounts a series of medical problems and a history of frequent hospitalization similar to that of the author.

== Reception ==
The book was received positively by critics, with The Observer calling it "a stunning portrait of a dead man seeking absolution."

The London Review of Books was more measured recognizing "Roth’s writing in the novels of the past decade has been distinguished by a powerfully propulsive energy. Reading Roth, when he is in the groove, is exhilarating because of the way one feels caught up in the swing and drive of the prose as it sweeps forward into the future of the text." Specifically of Everyman though, they recognize "that none of the suffering and death in it is singular enough to move us, perhaps because Roth has wanted, out of respect for his subject-matter, to lay art and laughter to one side."

== Audiobook ==
The audiobook version (ISBN 1-4193-8723-5) is narrated by George Guidall and published by Recorded Books in 2006.

== Morality play ==
Everyman is also the title of a fifteenth-century English morality play whose eponymous protagonist is "called" by death and must account for his life on earth before God. About the play, Roth said the following in a late 2005 interview:

The classic is called Everyman, it's from 1485, by an anonymous author. It was right in between the death of Chaucer and the birth of Shakespeare. The moral was always "Work hard and get into heaven", "Be a good Christian or go to hell". Everyman is the main character and he gets a visit from Death. He thinks it's some sort of messenger, but Death says, "I am Death" and Everyman's answer is the first great line in English drama: "Oh, Death, thou comest when I had thee least in mind." When I thought of you least.
