= Indignation (word) =

The word indignation is used to describe strong displeasure at something considered unjust, offensive, insulting or unrighteous.

== History of indignation ==
The term was coined in France during the 12th Century. It comes from the Latin word indignationem, meaning displeasure. In nominative form, indignationem is indignatio. Indignation is a noun of action from the past participle stem of indignari, meaning unworthy, to be angry at, or to be displeased with.

== Rhetoric ==
According to Cicero's De Inventione, Book I, "indignation is a kind of speech by which the effect produced is, that great hatred is excited against a man, or great dislike of some proceeding is originated." The goal is for the speaker to create anger projected towards the opponent or the accused such that the speaker is seen more positively than the opponent. One of the features of indignatio is that it cannot function without a target of displeasure. To successfully employ the technique, the speaker must have a target, an audience with which the speaker identifies, and a desired reaction. If a speaker achieves a reaction from the audience in which they are displeased with his opponent, then the speaker has successfully employed indignation.

== Aristotle ==
Aristotle wrote in his Rhetoric, Book II, Chapter 9, "indignation is the emotion most directly opposed to pity." Aristotle also writes "Indignation is pain caused by the sight of undeserved good fortune." The terms indignation and indignatio are closely related in part by their common negative emotionality and anger. A speaker may successfully employ indignation and the audience will feel indignation towards the opponent.
