= Elegy (film) =

2008 film by Isabel Coixet

- Theatrical release poster
- Directed by: Isabel Coixet
- Screenplay by: Nicholas Meyer
- Based on: The Dying Animal by Philip Roth
- Produced by: Tom Rosenberg; Gary Lucchesi; Andre Lamal
- Starring: Penélope Cruz; Ben Kingsley; Peter Sarsgaard; Patricia Clarkson; Dennis Hopper
- Cinematography: Jean-Claude Larrieu
- Edited by: Amy Duddleston
- Production company: Lakeshore Entertainment
- Distributed by: Samuel Goldwyn Films
- Release dates: February 10, 2008 (Berlin); August 8, 2008 (United States)
- Running time: 112 minutes
- Country: United States
- Languages: English; Spanish
- Budget: $13 million
- Box office: $14.9 million

Elegy is a 2008 American romantic drama film directed by Isabel Coixet from a screenplay by Nicholas Meyer, based on the 2001 novel The Dying Animal by Philip Roth. The film stars Penélope Cruz and Ben Kingsley, with Peter Sarsgaard, Patricia Clarkson, and Dennis Hopper in supporting roles. The film was set in New York City but was shot in Vancouver.

== Plot ==
David Kepesh is a cultural critic and professor, in a state of "emancipated manhood": His relationships with women are usually casual, brief and sexual in nature. Previously married, he has a son who has never forgiven him for leaving his mother. His friend, Pulitzer Prize-winning poet George O'Hearn, suggests that he "bifurcate" his life: have conversations and enjoy art with a wife, and "keep the sex just for sex". David is also in a casual 20-year relationship with Caroline, another former student.

He encounters Consuela Castillo, a beautiful and confident student who attends one of his lectures. She captures his attention like no other woman, and they begin a serious relationship. George advises him to leave her before she leaves him, but David cannot bring himself to give her up. They are a couple for a year and a half, during which he continues to sleep with Caroline; neither woman knows of the other's existence.

Over dinner, Consuela invites David to her graduation party. After some hesitation, he agrees to attend. On the day of the event, David phones Consuela and claims he is stuck in traffic and will be unavoidably delayed. In reality, he is sitting in his car, anxious about meeting Consuela's family. Heartbroken, Consuela hangs up, and they end their relationship. Shortly afterward, George suffers a stroke during a poetry conference after David introduces him, and later dies. David realizes too late that he genuinely loved Consuela, and ends his relationship with Caroline. He somewhat mends his relationship with his son, Kenny, who reveals that he is having an affair and indirectly asks David for advice.

Two years pass before Consuela and David come into contact again. On New Year's Eve, David arrives home to find a message from Consuela. She mentions that she needs to tell him something before he finds out from someone else. At his apartment, Consuela announces that she has found a lump in her breast and will need surgery. Grief-stricken, David cries and asks her why she didn't tell him sooner. Consuela then asks David to take photos of her breasts, before the doctors "ruin" them. David agrees.

In the final scene, David visits Consuela at the hospital where she is recovering from a mastectomy. Consuela says, "I will miss you". David responds, "I am here" as he climbs into the hospital bed and gently kisses her face. In a fantasy scene, the film flashes back to David and Consuela on the beach where Consuela told David she loves him.

== Cast ==
- Penélope Cruz as Consuela Castillo
- Ben Kingsley as David Kepesh
- Dennis Hopper as George O'Hearn
- Patricia Clarkson as Caroline
- Peter Sarsgaard as Kenneth Kepesh
- Deborah Harry as Amy O'Hearn
- Charlie Rose as himself
- Antonio Cupo as younger man
- Michelle Harrison as 2nd student
- Sonja Bennett as Beth
- Chelah Horsdal as Susan Reese

== Critical reception ==
Elegy received generally favorable reviews from critics. On the review aggregator website Rotten Tomatoes, the film holds an approval rating of 74% based on 121 reviews, with an average rating of 6.7/10. The website's critics consensus reads, "An intelligent, adult, and provocative Philip Roth adaptation that features classy performances, Elegy is never quite the sum of its parts." Metacritic, which uses a weighted average, assigned the film a score of 66 out of 100, based on 32 critics, indicating "generally favorable" reviews.

Top ten lists
The film appeared on several critics' top ten lists of the best films of 2008.

- 3rd – Kimberly Jones, The Austin Chronicle
- 4th – Mike Russell, The Oregonian
- 5th – Marjorie Baumgarten, The Austin Chronicle
- 6th – Andrea Gronvall, Chicago Reader
