= Nemesis (Roth novel) =

Novel by Philip Roth

- First edition
- Author: Philip Roth
- Language: English
- Published: 2010
- Publisher: Houghton Mifflin Harcourt
- Publication place: United States
- Pages: 280
- ISBN: 978-0-547-31835-6
- Preceded by: The Humbling

Nemesis is a novel by Philip Roth published on October 5, 2010, by Houghton Mifflin Harcourt. It is Roth's 31st book, "a work of fiction set in the summer of 1944 that tells of a polio epidemic and its effects on a closely knit Newark community and its children." In 2012, Philip Roth told an interviewer that Nemesis would be his last novel.

== Plot ==
Nemesis explores the effect of a 1944 polio epidemic on a closely knit, family-oriented Newark Jewish community of Weequahic neighborhood. The children are threatened with maiming, paralysis, lifelong disability, and death.

At the center of Nemesis is a vigorous, dutiful, 23-year-old teacher and playground director Bucky Cantor, a javelin thrower and weightlifter, who is devoted to his charges. Bucky feels guilty because his weak eyes have excluded him from serving in the war alongside his close friends and contemporaries. Focusing on Cantor's dilemmas as polio begins to ravage his playground, Roth examines some of the central themes of pestilence: fear, panic, anger, guilt, bewilderment, suffering, and pain. Cantor also faces a spiritual crisis, asking himself why God would allow innocent children to die of polio. Finally, Cantor faces a romantic crisis, becoming engaged to his beloved girlfriend (a fellow teacher who is working as a counselor at a Jewish summer camp). Fearing that Cantor will get polio if he remains in Newark during the summer, she implores him to quit his job in Newark and to join her at her polio-free summer camp. He wants to be with his fiancee, but leaving the children of Newark adds to his feelings of guilt.

With the inevitability of a Greek drama, polio eventually reaches the summer camp. One camper dies, several become ill, and Cantor himself is stricken. Cantor blames himself for having brought polio to the camp.

The novel ends in 1971, when Cantor encounters one of the Newark playground children who contracted polio and survived. They catch up on the events in their lives since 1944. Cantor reveals that, after being crippled by polio, he insisted that his fiancee leave him and find a non-crippled husband. He never marries. The novel is written as the narrative of the playground child, based on what Cantor told him in 1971.

== Reception ==
Nemesis was shortlisted for the 2011 Wellcome Trust Book Prize, which honors "the best of medicine in literature".

== Film adaptation ==
In May 2023, it was announced that Abner Benaim would direct an adaptation of the novel from a screenplay by Peter Glanz, with Pablo Larraín, Juan de Dios Larraín and Andrew Hevia producing under their Fabula banner.
