= Goodbye, Columbus =

1959 short story collection by Philip Roth

- First edition cover
- Author: Philip Roth
- Language: English
- Genre: Novella, short story collection
- Publisher: Houghton Mifflin
- Publication date: May 7, 1959
- Publication place: United States
- Media type: Print (hardback & paperback)
- Pages: 298
- ISBN: 0-679-74826-1
- OCLC: 2360171
- Followed by: Letting Go

Goodbye, Columbus is a 1959 collection of fiction by the American novelist Philip Roth. The compilation includes the title novella, "Goodbye, Columbus," originally published in The Paris Review, along with five short stories. It was Roth's first book and was published by Houghton Mifflin.

In addition to the title novella, set in Short Hills, New Jersey, Goodbye, Columbus contains the five short stories "The Conversion of the Jews", "Defender of the Faith", "Epstein", "You Can't Tell a Man by the Song He Sings", and "Eli, the Fanatic". Each story deals with the concerns of second and third-generation assimilated American Jews as they leave the ethnic ghettos of their parents and grandparents and go on to college, to white-collar professions, and to life in the suburbs.

The book was a critical success for Roth and won the 1960 U.S. National Book Award for Fiction. The book was not without controversy, as people within the Jewish community took issue with Roth's less than flattering portrayal of some characters. The short story “Defender of the Faith”, about a Jewish sergeant who is exploited by three shirking, coreligionist draftees, drew particular ire. When Roth appeared on a panel in 1962 alongside the distinguished black novelist Ralph Ellison to discuss minority representation in literature, the questions directed at him became denunciations. Many accused Roth of being a self-hating Jew, a label that stuck with him for years.

The title novella was made into the 1969 film Goodbye, Columbus, starring Ali MacGraw and Richard Benjamin.

== Roth's own retrospective reckoning ==
Roth wrote in the preface to the book's 30th anniversary edition:

"With clarity and with crudeness, and a great deal of exuberance, the embryonic writer who was me wrote these stories in his early 20s, while he was a graduate student at the University of Chicago, a soldier stationed in New Jersey and Washington, and a novice English instructor back at Chicago following his Army discharge...In the beginning it amazed him that any literate audience could seriously be interested in his story of tribal secrets, in what he knew, as a child of his neighborhood, about the rites and taboos of his clan—about their aversions, their aspirations, their fears of deviance and defection, their embarrassments and ideas of success."

== The novella ==
The title story of the collection, Goodbye, Columbus, is an irreverent look at the life of middle-class Jewish Americans, satirizing, according to one reviewer, their "complacency, parochialism, and materialism." It was controversial with reviewers, who were highly polarized in their judgments.

The story is told by the narrator, Neil Klugman, who is working in a low-paying position in the Newark Public Library. He lives with his Aunt Gladys and Uncle Max in a working-class neighborhood of Newark, New Jersey. One summer, Neil meets and falls for Brenda Patimkin, a student at Radcliffe College who is from a wealthy family living in the affluent suburb of Short Hills. Neil persuades Brenda to get a diaphragm, which her mother discovers.

The novella was adapted into a film of the same name in 1969.

== Short stories ==
=== "The Conversion of the Jews" ===
This short story, which first appeared in The Paris Review (issue 18, Spring 1958) — deals with the themes of questioning religion and being violent to one another because of it.

Ozzie Freedman, a Jewish-American boy about thirteen years old, confronts his Hebrew school teacher, Rabbi Binder, with challenging questions: especially, whether it is possible that God gave the Virgin Mary a child without having intercourse. Rabbi Binder interprets Ozzie's question about the virgin birth as impertinent, though Ozzie sincerely wishes to better understand God and his faith. When Ozzie continues to ask challenging questions, Binder slaps him on the face, accidentally bloodying Ozzie's nose. Ozzie calls Binder a bastard and, without thinking, runs to the roof of the synagogue. Once there, Ozzie threatens to jump.

The rabbi and pupils go out to watch Ozzie from the pavement and try to convince him not to leap. Ozzie's mother arrives. Ozzie threatens to jump unless they all bow on their knees in the Christian tradition and admit that God can make a virgin birth, and furthermore, that they believe in Jesus Christ; he then admonishes all those present that they should never "hit anyone about God". He finally ends by jumping off the roof onto a glowing yellow net held by firemen.

=== "Defender of the Faith" ===
The story—originally published in The New Yorker on March 14, 1959 (online) — deals with a Jewish American army sergeant who resists the attempted manipulation of a fellow Jew to exploit their mutual ethnicity to receive special favours. The story caused consternation among Jewish readers and religious groups, as recounted in chapter five of Roth's 1988 memoir The Facts: A Novelist's Autobiography.

=== "Epstein" ===
The title character goes through a crisis, feeling at age fifty-nine that by accepting the responsibilities of business, marriage, and parenthood, he has missed out on life, and starts an affair with another woman. His wife believes he has syphilis so she wants a divorce, then he has a heart attack.

=== "You Can't Tell a Man by the Song He Sings" ===
An unnamed narrator recalls the events surrounding his meeting with Alberto Pelagutti, a troublemaker, in high school. The story had previously been published in the November 1957 issue of Commentary. When the story first appeared in Commentary, it was published in the magazine’s “From the American Scene” section, a feature typically reserved for nonfiction sketches of Jewish immigrant life. Its placement there effectively presented the piece as a memoir set in Roth’s native Weequahic neighborhood of Newark. Roth did not object to this framing at the time, but when he reprinted “You Can’t Tell a Man by the Song He Sings” in Goodbye, Columbus two years later, he classified it as fiction.

=== "Eli, the Fanatic" ===
The assimilated Jews of a small community express fear that their peaceful coexistence with the Gentiles will be disturbed by the establishment of an Orthodox yeshiva in their neighborhood. Eli, a lawyer, tries to calm things down, while his wife is about to give birth and Eli is suspected to be having a nervous breakdown.

== Reception ==
The book was a critical success for Roth and won the 1960 U.S. National Book Award for Fiction. It was also commercially successful, appearing in multiple printings in both hardcover and paperback formats.

Saul Bellow praised the collection in the July 1959 issue of Commentary: "Goodbye, Columbus is a first book but it is not the book of a beginner. Unlike those of us who came howling into the world, blind and bare, Mr. Roth appears with nails, hair, and teeth, speaking coherently. At twenty-six he is skillful, witty, and energetic and performs like a virtuoso."

Elsewhere, William Peden praised the collection in The New York Times: "There is blood here and vigor, love and hate, irony and compassion." Peden continued: "Mr. Roth has written a perceptive, often witty and frequently moving piece of fiction. He is a good story-teller, a shrewd appraiser of character and a keen recorder of an indecisive generation."

=== Controversy ===
Upon its release, Goodbye, Columbus drew criticism from some Jewish commentators, who argued that the book ignored Jewish religious and cultural traditions, failed to show sufficient sensitivity to the legacy of the Holocaust, and reflected what they saw as elements of Jewish self‑hatred. Critics invested in cultural assimilation, argued that Roth’s characters failed to reflect the refined and educated assimilated mainstream of American Jewish life. The Jewish characters were instead blunt or socially unpolished, such as Neil’s Aunt Gladys, or conspicuously affluent, like Brenda Patimkin’s father. Rabbi Theodore Lewis rebuked that Roth "depicts the Jewish characters in his short stories and novels as depraved and lecherous creatures.”

Roth responded to the criticism in a 1964 essay "Writing About Jews", arguing that the criticism stemmed from a misplaced defensiveness within segments of the Jewish community. He maintained that his detractors were “ashamed of what I see no reason to be ashamed of, and defensive where there is no cause for defense.” According to Roth, their concern that he was “informing” on Jews reflected a longstanding anxiety encapsulated in the question, “What will the goyim think?” He contended that this attitude rested on the belief that Jewish security depended on concealing unflattering behaviour, whereas, in his view, “the solution is not to convince people to like Jews so as not to want to kill them; it is to let them know that they cannot kill them even if they despise them.”

Roth accepted that fictional representations of Jewish life carried cultural weight, but he rejected the idea that writers should suppress traits perceived as negative. Instead, he argued that confronting such characteristics openly was preferable to avoiding or sanitizing them. Roth argued that fiction could serve a clarifying cultural purpose, describing “literary investigation” as a means of engaging honestly with aspects of Jewish life. Such writing, he suggested, “may even be a way to redeem the facts [about the way Jews really are], to give them the weight and value that they should have in the world, rather than the disproportionate significance they probably have for some misguided or vicious people.”
