= Indignation (novel) =

Novel by Philip Roth

- First edition cover
- Author: Philip Roth
- Language: English
- Genre: Novel
- Publisher: Houghton Mifflin
- Publication date: September 16, 2008
- Publication place: United States
- Pages: 233 pp
- ISBN: 978-0-547-05484-1
- OCLC: 212846986
- Dewey Decimal: 813/.54 22
- LC Class: PS3568.O855 I53 2008

Indignation is a novel by Philip Roth, released by Houghton Mifflin on September 16, 2008. It is his twenty-ninth book.

== Plot ==
Set in America in 1951, the second year of the Korean War, Indignation is narrated by Marcus Messner, a Jewish college student from Newark, New Jersey, who describes his sophomore year at Winesburg College in Ohio (a reference to the fictional Winesburg, Ohio). Marcus transfers to Winesburg from Robert Treat College in Newark to escape his father, a kosher butcher, who appears to have become consumed with fear about the dangers of adult life, the world, and the uncertainty that awaits his son.

At Winesburg College, Marcus becomes infatuated with a fellow student, Olivia Hutton, a survivor of a suicide attempt. The sexually inexperienced Marcus is bewildered when Olivia performs fellatio on him during their one and only date. Marcus' mother objects to his dating someone who attempted suicide and makes him vow to end their relationship.

Marcus has an adversarial relationship with the dean of men, Hawes Caudwell. In a meeting in Dean Caudwell's office, Marcus objects to the chapel attendance requirement on the grounds that he is an atheist. In this meeting, he quotes extensively from Bertrand Russell's essay "Why I Am Not a Christian". Later, the dean finds Marcus guilty of hiring another student to attend chapel in his place; when Marcus refuses to attend double the number of chapel services as punishment, the dean expels him. His expulsion allows the U.S. Army to draft him and send him to fight in Korea where he is killed in combat. Early in the novel, Marcus explains that he is dead and telling his story from the afterlife; later it is revealed that he is unconscious from his combat wounds and the morphine that has been administered.

The Winesburg setting is a homage to Sherwood Anderson's book Winesburg, Ohio.

== Film ==
Film producer Scott Rudin bought the rights to Indignation in April 2008, five months before the book was scheduled to be published. In September 2008, Lauren Lipton argued on Portfolio.com that Rudin was unwise to acquire the rights to the book "given Roth's Hollywood track record," saying that, "of his many tomes, only a few have made it to the big screen to date."

A film adaptation, Indignation, was eventually made in 2016, without Rudin's involvement. It was directed and written by James Schamus (in his directorial debut), and starred Logan Lerman as Marcus, Sarah Gadon as Olivia, and Tracy Letts as Dean Caudwell. The film received positive reviews.
