= The Breast =

1972 novella by Philip Roth

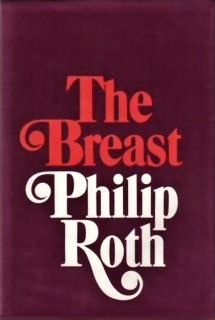
- First edition cover
- Author: Philip Roth
- Language: English
- Genre: Novella
- Publisher: Houghton Mifflin
- Publication date: 1972
- Publication place: United States
- Media type: Print (hardcover)
- Pages: 113
- ISBN: 0-03-003716-6
- OCLC: 482720
- Dewey Decimal: 813/.5/4
- LC Class: PZ4.R8454 Br PS3568.O855
- Followed by: The Professor of Desire

The Breast (1972) is a novella by Philip Roth, in which the protagonist, David Kepesh, becomes a 155-pound breast. Throughout the book, Kepesh fights with himself. Part of him wishes to give in to bodily desires, while the other part of him wants to be rational. Kepesh, a literature professor, compares his plight with that of fictional characters such as Gregor Samsa in Kafka's short story The Metamorphosis and Kovalyov in Nikolai Gogol's short story "The Nose". Throughout the novella, he describes the various sexual and physical feelings he has while people handle him, while initiating sex with his girlfriend, and while he is alone.

During a stay on the beach with his girlfriend, Claire, Kepesh had wished to have breasts, to be a breast, and he struggles with the idea that apparently this wish was fulfilled while other more important wishes were not.
