= The Professor of Desire =

1977 novel by Philip Roth

- First edition
- Author: Philip Roth
- Language: English
- Publisher: Farrar, Straus & Giroux
- Publication date: 1977
- Publication place: United States
- Media type: Print (Hardback & Paperback)
- Pages: 263 pp
- ISBN: 0-374-23756-5
- OCLC: 3089703

The Professor of Desire is a 1977 novel by Philip Roth. It describes the youth, the college years and the academic career of professor David Kepesh, and beside that, his sexual desires. The book was nominated for the National Book Critics Circle Award.

== Plot summary ==
David is emotionally insecure. He grows up in the hotel his parents manage, where he is influenced by artist Herbie Bratasky, who, thanks to his ingenuity in imitating sounds of farts, defecation and toilet flushing, is credited with "mastering the whole Wagner scale of fecal Storm and Stress".

When he attends a college, he rooms with a lazy, often-masturbating, homosexual, draft-dodging, fellow student, who inadvertently adds to Kepesh's insecurity. At first, he seems to accept the odd facts about his colleague, but then he's shocked when he's told by others that he deviated from so many social norms.

David, often lusting after female co-students, never has a successful date. He often annoys girls by telling them they have gorgeous bodily features. Kepesh, with a Fulbright grant in his pocket, goes to London, where he meets two sexually interested Swedish girls, Birgitta and Elisabeth.

Back in America, he moves to California, where he gets acquainted with Helen, a woman dreaming of opening a store. Helen has a history of promiscuity dating back to her early twenties, when she lived in Hong Kong and other places in Asia. Helen does not feel loved by Kepesh. She refuses to do household duties because Kepesh gives her only sexual attention; unable to speak of his emotions, Kepesh submits to that "fact" and ends up doing all the housework as well as teaching literature classes and writing papers on Anton Chekhov.

Kepesh separates from Helen and goes to New York to give lectures in literature, but his emotional side not yet formed or refined, he has endless sessions with a psychoanalyst and even uses his literature class (which he later calls "Desire 341" after the course number) to contrast his own desires and experiences with those portrayed in works like Gustave Flaubert's Madame Bovary. He even persuades the students to hear about and discuss his own love life. On a visit to Prague, birthplace of the equally sexually inexperienced Franz Kafka, he dreams of visiting the still-living prostitute of Kafka who invites him to look at her crotch; presuming he wants to see why it held Kafka's interest for so long.
