= Philip Roth =

American novelist (1933–2018)

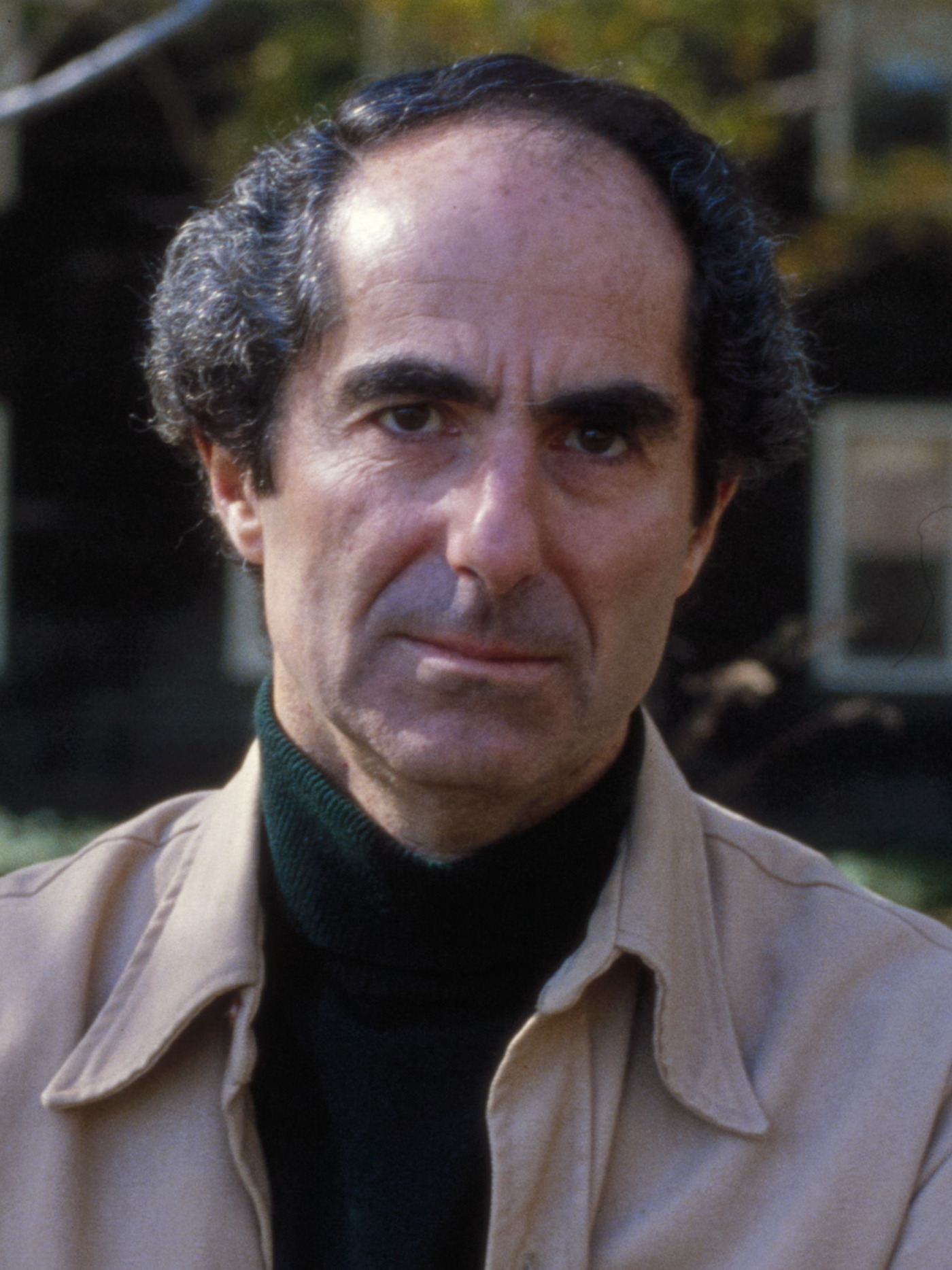
- Roth c. 1980s
- Born: Philip Milton Roth; March 19, 1933; Newark, New Jersey, U.S.
- Died: May 22, 2018 (aged 85); New York City, U.S.
- Resting place: Bard College Cemetery
- Education: Bucknell University (BA); University of Chicago (MA)
- Occupation: Novelist
- Spouses: Margaret Martinson Williams (m. 1959; div. 1963); Claire Bloom (m. 1990; div. 1995)
- Writing career
- Period: 1959–2010
- Genre: Literary fiction

Philip Milton Roth (/rɒθ/; March 19, 1933 – May 22, 2018) was an American novelist and short-story writer. Roth's fiction—often set in his birthplace of Newark, New Jersey—is known for its intensely autobiographical character, sexual humor, philosophical and formal blurring of the distinction between reality and fiction, "sensual, ingenious style", and provocative explorations of Jewish and American identity. Roth first gained attention with the 1959 short story collection Goodbye, Columbus, which won the U.S. National Book Award for Fiction. Ten years later, he published the bestseller Portnoy's Complaint. Roth's literary alter ego Nathan Zuckerman narrates several of his books. A fictionalized Roth narrates others, such as the alternate history The Plot Against America.

Roth is one of the most honored American writers of his generation. He received the National Book Critics Circle award for The Counterlife, the PEN/Faulkner Award for Operation Shylock, The Human Stain, and Everyman, a second National Book Award for Sabbath's Theater, and the Pulitzer Prize for American Pastoral. In 2001, Roth received the inaugural Franz Kafka Prize in Prague. In 2005, the Library of America began publishing his complete works, making him the second author so anthologized while still living, after Eudora Welty. Harold Bloom named him one of the four greatest American novelists of his day, along with Cormac McCarthy, Thomas Pynchon, and Don DeLillo. James Wood wrote: "More than any other post-war American writer, Roth wrote the self—the self was examined, cajoled, lampooned, fictionalized, ghosted, exalted, disgraced but above all constituted by and in writing. Maybe you have to go back to the very different Henry James to find an American novelist so purely a bundle of words, so restlessly and absolutely committed to the investigation and construction of life through language... He would not cease from exploration; he could not cease, and the varieties of fiction existed for him to explore the varieties of experience".

== Early life and academic pursuits ==
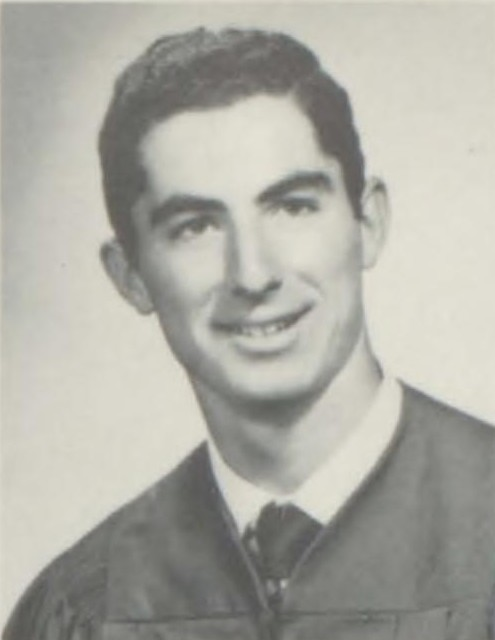
Roth's 1950 yearbook photo

Philip Roth was born in Newark, New Jersey, on March 19, 1933, and grew up at 81 Summit Avenue in the Weequahic neighborhood. He was the second child of Bess (née Finkel) and Herman Roth, an insurance broker. Roth's family was Jewish, and his parents were second-generation Americans. His paternal grandparents came from Kozlov near Lviv (then Lemberg) in Austrian Galicia, and his mother's ancestors were from the region of Kyiv in Ukraine. He graduated from Newark's Weequahic High School in or around 1950.

In 1969, Arnold H. Lubasch wrote in The New York Times that the school "has provided the focus for the fiction of Philip Roth, the novelist who evokes his era at Weequahic High School in the highly acclaimed Portnoy's Complaint. Besides identifying Weequahic High School by name, the novel specifies such sites as the Empire Burlesque, the Weequahic Diner, the Newark Museum and Irvington Park, all local landmarks that helped shape the youth of the real Roth and the fictional Portnoy, both graduates of Weequahic class of '50." The 1950 Weequahic Yearbook calls Roth a "boy of real intelligence, combined with wit and common sense". He was known as a comedian during his time at school.

=== Academic career ===
Roth attended Rutgers University in Newark for a year, then transferred to Bucknell University in Pennsylvania, where he earned a B.A. magna cum laude in English and was elected to Phi Beta Kappa. He received a fellowship to attend the University of Chicago, where he earned an M.A. in English literature in 1955 and briefly worked as an instructor in the university's writing program. That same year, rather than wait to be drafted, Roth enlisted in the army, but suffered a back injury during basic training and was given a medical discharge. He returned to Chicago in 1956 to study for a PhD in literature, but dropped out after one term. Roth was a longtime faculty member at the University of Pennsylvania, where he taught comparative literature until retiring from teaching in 1991. He then took a part-time visiting lecturer position at Bard College, where his friend Norman Manea had long been a distinguished writer in residence, and where the two co-taught a class in 1999.

== Writing career ==
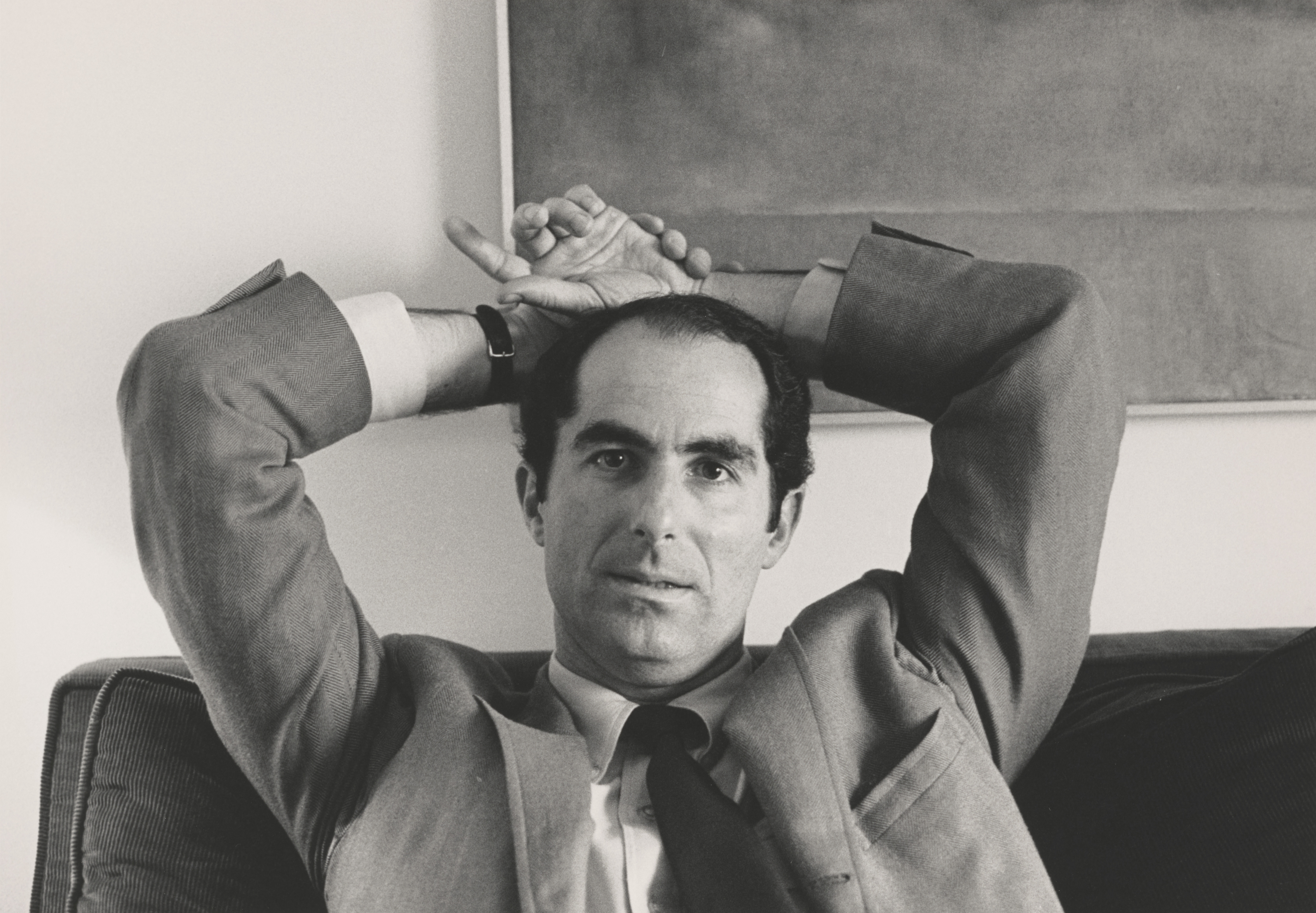
Roth in 1967

Roth's work first appeared in print in the Chicago Review while he was studying, and later teaching, at the University of Chicago. His first book, Goodbye, Columbus, contains the novella Goodbye, Columbus and four short stories. It won the National Book Award in 1960. He published his first full-length novel, Letting Go, in 1962. In 1967 he published When She Was Good, set in the WASP Midwest in the 1940s. It is based in part on the life of Margaret Martinson Williams, whom Roth married in 1959.

The publication in 1969 of his fourth and most controversial novel, Portnoy's Complaint, gave Roth widespread commercial and critical success, causing his profile to rise significantly. During the 1970s Roth experimented in various modes, from the political satire Our Gang (1971) to the Kafkaesque The Breast (1972). By the end of the decade Roth had created his alter ego Nathan Zuckerman. In a series of highly self-referential novels and novellas that followed between 1979 and 1986, Zuckerman appeared as either the main character or an interlocutor.

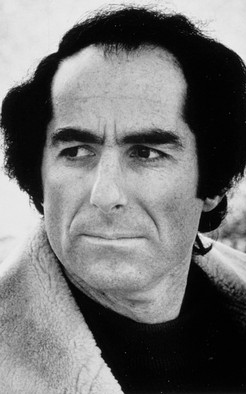
Roth in 1973

Sabbath's Theater (1995) may have Roth's most lecherous protagonist, Mickey Sabbath, a disgraced former puppeteer. It won his second National Book Award. In complete contrast, American Pastoral (1997), the first volume of his so-called American Trilogy, focuses on the life of virtuous Newark star athlete Swede Levov, and the tragedy that befalls him when his teenage daughter becomes a domestic terrorist during the late 1960s. It won the Pulitzer Prize for Fiction.

The Dying Animal (2001) is a short novel about eros and death that revisits literary professor David Kepesh, protagonist of two 1970s works, The Breast and The Professor of Desire (1977). In The Plot Against America (2004), Roth imagines an alternative American history in which Charles Lindbergh, aviator hero and isolationist, is elected U.S. President in 1940, and the U.S. negotiates an understanding with Hitler's Nazi Germany and embarks on its own program of antisemitism.

Roth's novel Everyman, a meditation on illness, aging, desire, and death, was published in May 2006. It was Roth's third book to win the PEN/Faulkner Award, making him the only person so honored. Exit Ghost, which again features Nathan Zuckerman, was released in October 2007. It was the last Zuckerman novel. Indignation, Roth's 29th book, was published on September 16, 2008. Set in 1951, during the Korean War, it follows Marcus Messner's departure from Newark to Ohio's Winesburg College, where he begins his sophomore year. In 2009, Roth's 30th book, The Humbling, was published. It tells the story of the last performances of Simon Axler, a celebrated stage actor. Roth's 31st book, Nemesis, was published on October 5, 2010. According to the book's notes, Nemesis is the last in a series of four "short novels", after Everyman, Indignation and The Humbling. In October 2009, during an interview with Tina Brown of The Daily Beast to promote The Humbling, Roth considered the future of literature and its place in society, stating his belief that within 25 years the reading of novels will be regarded as a "cultic" activity:

I was being optimistic about 25 years really. I think it's going to be cultic. I think always people will be reading them but it will be a small group of people. Maybe more people than now read Latin poetry, but somewhere in that range. ... To read a novel requires a certain amount of concentration, focus, devotion to the reading. If you read a novel in more than two weeks you don't read the novel really. So I think that kind of concentration and focus and attentiveness is hard to come by—it's hard to find huge numbers of people, large numbers of people, significant numbers of people, who have those qualities[.]

When asked about the prospects for printed versus digital books, Roth was equally downbeat:

The book can't compete with the screen. It couldn't compete beginning with the movie screen. It couldn't compete with the television screen, and it can't compete with the computer screen. ... Now we have all those screens, so against all those screens a book couldn't measure up.

This was not the first time Roth had expressed pessimism about the future of the novel and its significance in recent years. Talking to The Observer's Robert McCrum in 2001, he said, "I'm not good at finding 'encouraging' features in American culture. I doubt that aesthetic literacy has much of a future here." In an October 2012 interview with the French magazine Les Inrockuptibles, Roth announced that he would be retiring from writing and confirmed subsequently in Le Monde that he would no longer publish fiction. In a May 2014 interview with Alan Yentob for the BBC, Roth said, "this is my last appearance on television, my absolutely last appearance on any stage anywhere."

Reflecting on his writing career, in an afterword written on the 25th anniversary of the publication of Portnoy's Complaint, Roth wrote, "I wished to dazzle in my very own way and to dazzle myself no less than anyone else." To inspire himself to write, he recalled thinking, "All you have to do is sit down and work!"

== Influences and themes ==
Much of Roth's fiction revolves around semi-autobiographical themes, while self-consciously and playfully addressing the perils of establishing connections between Roth and his fictional lives and voices. Examples of this close relationship between the author's life and his characters' include narrators and protagonists such as David Kepesh and Nathan Zuckerman as well as the character "Philip Roth", who appears in The Plot Against America and of whom there are two in Operation Shylock. Critic Jacques Berlinerblau noted in The Chronicle of Higher Education that these fictional voices create a complex and tricky experience for readers, deceiving them into believing they "know" Roth.

In Roth's fiction the question of authorship is intertwined with the theme of the idealistic, secular Jewish son who attempts to distance himself from Jewish customs and traditions, and from what he perceives as the sometimes suffocating influence of parents, rabbis, and other community leaders. Roth's fiction has been described by critics as pervaded by "a kind of alienation that is enlivened and exacerbated by what binds it".

Roth's first work, Goodbye, Columbus, was an irreverently humorous depiction of the life of middle-class Jewish Americans and received highly polarized reviews; one reviewer found it infused with self-loathing. In response, Roth, in his 1963 essay "Writing About Jews" (collected in Reading Myself and Others), maintained that he wanted to explore the conflict between the call to Jewish solidarity and his desire to be free to question the values and morals of middle-class Jewish Americans uncertain of their identities in an era of cultural assimilation and upward social mobility:

The cry 'Watch out for the goyim!' at times seems more the expression of an unconscious wish than of a warning: Oh that they were out there, so that we could be together here! A rumor of persecution, a taste of exile, might even bring with it the old world of feelings and habits—something to replace the new world of social accessibility and moral indifference, the world which tempts all our promiscuous instincts, and where one cannot always figure out what a Jew is that a Christian is not.

In Roth's fiction the exploration of "promiscuous instincts" within the context of Jewish lives, mainly from a male viewpoint, plays an important role. In the words of critic Hermione Lee:

Philip Roth's fiction strains to shed the burden of Jewish traditions and proscriptions. ... The liberated Jewish consciousness, let loose into the disintegration of the American Dream, finds itself deracinated and homeless. American society and politics, by the late sixties, are a grotesque travesty of what Jewish immigrants had traveled towards: liberty, peace, security, a decent liberal democracy.

While Roth's fiction has strong autobiographical influences, it also incorporates social commentary and political satire, most obviously in Our Gang and Operation Shylock. From the 1990s on, Roth's fiction often combined autobiographical elements with retrospective dramatizations of postwar American life. Roth described American Pastoral and the two following novels as a loosely connected "American trilogy". Each of these novels treats aspects of the postwar era against the backdrop of the nostalgically remembered Jewish American childhood of Nathan Zuckerman, in which the experience of life on the American home front during the Second World War features prominently. American Pastoral looks at the legacy of the 1960s, as Swede Levov's daughter becomes an antiwar terrorist. I Married a Communist (1998), in which radio actor Ira Ringold is revealed as a communist sympathizer, is set in the McCarthy era. The Human Stain, in which classics professor Coleman Silk's secret history is revealed, explores identity politics in the late 1990s.

In much of Roth's fiction, the 1940s, comprising Roth's and Zuckerman's childhood, mark a high point of American idealism and social cohesion. A more satirical treatment of the patriotism and idealism of the war years is evident in Roth's comic novels, such as Portnoy's Complaint and Sabbath's Theater. In The Plot Against America, the alternate history of the war years dramatizes the prevalence of antisemitism and racism in America at the time, despite the promotion of increasingly influential anti-racist ideals during the war. In his fiction, Roth portrayed the 1940s, and the New Deal era of the 1930s that preceded it, as a heroic phase in American history. A sense of frustration with social and political developments in the United States since the 1940s is palpable in the American trilogy and Exit Ghost, but had already been present in Roth's earlier works that contained political and social satire, such as Our Gang and The Great American Novel. Writing about the latter, Hermione Lee points to the sense of disillusionment with "the American Dream" in Roth's fiction: "The mythic words on which Roth's generation was brought up—winning, patriotism, gamesmanship—are desanctified; greed, fear, racism, and political ambition are disclosed as the motive forces behind the 'all-American ideals'." Although Roth's writings often explored the Jewish experience in America, Roth rejected being labeled a Jewish American writer. "It's not a question that interests me. I know exactly what it means to be Jewish and it's really not interesting," he told the Guardian newspaper in 2005. "I'm an American."

Roth was a baseball fan, and credited the game with shaping his literary sensibility. In an essay published in The New York Times on Opening Day, 1973, Roth wrote that "baseball, with its lore and legends, its cultural power, its seasonal associations, its native authenticity, its simple rules and transparent strategy, its longueurs and thrills, its spaciousness, its suspensefulness, its heroics, its nuances, its lingo, its 'characters,' its peculiarly hypnotic tedium, its mythic transformation of the immediate, was the literature of my boyhood. ... Of course, as time passed neither the flavor and suggestiveness of Red Barber's narration, nor specific details, vivid and revealing even as Rex Barney's pre-game hot dog, could continue to satisfy a developing literary appetite; there is no doubt, however, that they helped sustain me until I was old enough and literate enough to begin to respond to the great inventors of narrative detail and masters of narrative voice and perspective, like James and Conrad and Dostoyevsky and Bellow." Baseball features in several of Roth's novels; the hero of Portnoy's Complaint dreams of playing like Duke Snider, and Nicholas Dawidoff called The Great American Novel "one of the most eccentric baseball novels ever written". American Pastoral alludes to John R. Tunis's baseball novel The Kid from Tomkinsville.

In a speech on his 80th birthday, Roth emphasized the importance of realistic detail in American literature:

the passion for specificity, the hypnotic materiality of the world one is in, is all but at the heart of the task to which every American novelist has been enjoined since Herman Melville and his whale and Mark Twain and his river: to discover the most arresting, evocative verbal depiction of every last American thing. Without strong representation of the thing—animate or inanimate—without the crucial representation of what is real, there is nothing. Its concreteness, its unabashed focus on all the particulars, a fervor for the singular and a profound aversion to generalities is fiction's lifeblood. It is from a scrupulous fidelity to the blizzard of specific data that is a personal life, it is from the force of its uncompromising particularity, from its physicalness, that the realistic novel, the insatiable realistic novel with its multitude of realities, derives its ruthless intimacy. And its mission: to portray humanity in its particularity.

== Personal life ==
While at Chicago in 1956, Roth met Margaret Martinson, who became his first wife in 1959. Their separation in 1963, and Martinson's subsequent death in a car crash in 1968, left a lasting mark on Roth's literary output. Martinson was the inspiration for female characters in several of Roth's novels, including Lucy Nelson in When She Was Good and Maureen Tarnopol in My Life as a Man.

Roth was an atheist who once said, "When the whole world doesn't believe in God, it'll be a great place." He also said during an interview with The Guardian: "I'm exactly the opposite of religious, I'm anti-religious. I find religious people hideous. I hate the religious lies. It's all a big lie ... It's not a neurotic thing, but the miserable record of religion—I don't even want to talk about it. It's not interesting to talk about the sheep referred to as believers. When I write, I'm alone. It's filled with fear and loneliness and anxiety—and I never needed religion to save me."

In 1990, Roth married his longtime companion, English actress Claire Bloom, with whom he had been living since 1976. According to Bloom, when she asked him to marry her, he agreed on the condition that she sign a prenuptial agreement that would give her very little in the event of a divorce; he requested one in 1993 and made her a settlement of $100,000. He also stipulated that Bloom's daughter Anna Steiger—from her marriage to Rod Steiger—not live with them. They divorced in 1994, and Bloom published a 1996 memoir, Leaving a Doll's House, that depicted Roth as a misogynist and control freak. It offers what historian and Roth biographer Steven Zipperstein has called a "bleak, acidic portrayal of their marriage [...] with most reviewers taking its accuracy for granted", although Bloom later said she was unable to care for Roth when he had "severe mental anguish so overwhelming that he admitted himself as a psychiatric patient to Silver Hill Hospital". Some critics have detected parallels between Bloom and the character Eve Frame in Roth's I Married a Communist (1998).

The novel Operation Shylock (1993) and other works draw on a post-operative breakdown, as well as Roth's experience of the temporary side effects of the sedative Halcion (triazolam), prescribed post-operatively in the 1980s.

== Death and burial ==
Roth died at a Manhattan hospital of heart failure on May 22, 2018, at the age of 85. Roth was buried at the Bard College Cemetery in Annandale-on-Hudson, New York, where in 1999 he taught a class. He had planned to be buried next to his parents at the Gomel Chesed Cemetery in Newark, but changed his mind about 15 years before his death, in order to be close to where his friend Norman Manea was a writer in residence, and other Jews "to whom he could talk". Roth expressly banned any religious rituals from his funeral service, though it was noted that, the day after his burial, a pebble had been placed on top of his tombstone in accordance with Jewish tradition.

== List of works ==
=== Dr. Spielvogel novels ===
- Portnoy's Complaint (1969)
- My Life as a Man (1974)

=== Nathan Zuckerman novels ===
- Zuckerman Bound (1979–1985)
  - The Ghost Writer (1979)
  - Zuckerman Unbound (1981)
  - The Anatomy Lesson (1983)
  - The Prague Orgy (1985)
- The Counterlife (1986)
- The American Trilogy (1997–2000)
  - American Pastoral (1997)
  - I Married a Communist (1998)
  - The Human Stain (2000)
- Exit Ghost (2007)

=== David Kepesh novels ===
- The Breast (1972)
- The Professor of Desire (1977)
- The Dying Animal (2001)

=== "Roth" novels and memoirs ===
- The Facts: A Novelist's Autobiography (1988)
- Deception: A Novel (1990)
- Patrimony: A True Story (1991)
- Operation Shylock: A Confession (1993)
- The Plot Against America (2004)

=== "Nemeses" novels ===
- Everyman (2006)
- Indignation (2008)
- The Humbling (2009)
- Nemesis (2010)

=== Standalone novels ===
- Goodbye, Columbus and Five Short Stories (1959)
- Letting Go (1962)
- When She Was Good (1967)
- Our Gang (1971)
- The Great American Novel (1973)
- Sabbath's Theater (1995)

== Awards and nominations ==
Two of Roth's works won the National Book Award for Fiction; four others were finalists. Two won National Book Critics Circle awards; another five were finalists. Roth won three PEN/Faulkner Awards (for Operation Shylock, The Human Stain, and Everyman) and a Pulitzer Prize for his 1997 novel American Pastoral.

In 2001, The Human Stain was awarded the United Kingdom's WH Smith Literary Award for the best book of the year, as well as France's Prix Médicis Étranger. Also in 2001, the MacDowell Colony awarded Roth the 42nd Edward MacDowell Medal. In 2002, Roth was awarded the National Book Foundation Medal for Distinguished Contribution to American Letters.

In 2003, literary critic Harold Bloom named Roth one of the four major American novelists still at work, along with Cormac McCarthy, Thomas Pynchon, and Don DeLillo. The Plot Against America (2004) won the Sidewise Award for Alternate History in 2005 and the Society of American Historians' James Fenimore Cooper Prize. Roth was also awarded the United Kingdom's WH Smith Literary Award for the best book of the year, an award he received twice.

In October 2005, Roth was honored in his hometown when then-mayor Sharpe James presided over the unveiling of a street sign in Roth's name on the corner of Summit and Keer Avenues, where Roth lived for much of his childhood, a setting prominent in The Plot Against America. A plaque on the house where the Roths lived was unveiled. In May 2006, he received the PEN/Nabokov Award, and in 2007 he received the PEN/Faulkner award for Everyman, making him the award's only three-time winner. In April 2007, he received the first PEN/Saul Bellow Award for Achievement in American Fiction.

The May 21, 2006, issue of The New York Times Book Review announced the results of a letter that was sent to what the publication described as "a couple of hundred prominent writers, critics, editors and other literary sages, asking them to identify 'the single best work of American fiction published in the last 25 years'". American Pastoral tied for fifth, and The Counterlife, Operation Shylock, Sabbath's Theater, The Human Stain and The Plot Against America received multiple votes. In the accompanying essay, A. O. Scott wrote: "Over the past 15 years, Roth's output has been so steady, so various and (mostly) so excellent that his vote has been, inevitably, split. If we had asked for the single best writer of fiction of the past 25 years, he would have won." Scott notes that "The Roth whose primary concern is the past—the elegiac, summarizing, conservative Roth—is preferred over his more aesthetically radical, restless, present-minded doppelgänger by a narrow but decisive margin." In 2009, Roth received the German newspaper Die Welt's Welt-Literaturpreis.

President Barack Obama awarded Roth the 2010 National Humanities Medal in the East Room of the White House on March 2, 2011.

In May 2011, Roth was awarded the Man Booker International Prize for lifetime achievement in fiction on the world stage, the fourth winner of the biennial prize. One of the judges, Carmen Callil, a publisher of the feminist Virago house, withdrew in protest, referring to Roth's work as "Emperor's clothes". She said "he goes on and on and on about the same subject in almost every single book. It's as though he's sitting on your face and you can't breathe ... I don't rate him as a writer at all ...". Observers noted that Callil had a conflict of interest, having published a book by Claire Bloom (Roth's ex-wife) that criticized Roth and lambasted their marriage. In response, one of the two other Booker judges, Rick Gekoski, remarked:

In 1959 he writes Goodbye, Columbus and it's a masterpiece, magnificent. Fifty-one years later he's 78 years old and he writes Nemesis and it is so wonderful, such a terrific novel ... Tell me one other writer who 50 years apart writes masterpieces ... If you look at the trajectory of the average novel writer, there is a learning period, then a period of high achievement, then the talent runs out and in middle age they start slowly to decline. People say why aren't Martin [Amis] and Julian [Barnes] getting on the Booker prize shortlist, but that's what happens in middle age. Philip Roth, though, gets better and better in middle age. In the 1990s he was almost incapable of not writing a masterpiece—The Human Stain, The Plot Against America, I Married a Communist. He was 65–70 years old, what the hell's he doing writing that well?

In 2012 Roth received the Prince of Asturias Award for literature. On March 19, 2013, his 80th birthday was celebrated in public ceremonies at the Newark Museum.

One prize that eluded Roth was the Nobel Prize in Literature, though he was nominated for the prize as early as 1972 and was a favorite of bookmakers and critics for decades. Ron Charles of The Washington Post wrote that "thundering obituaries" around the world noted that "he won every other honor a writer could win", sometimes even two or three times, except the Nobel Prize.

Roth worked hard to obtain his many awards, spending large amounts of time "networking, scratching people's backs, placing his people in positions, voting for them" in order to increase his chances of receiving awards.

=== Films ===
Eight of Roth's novels and short stories have been adapted as films: Goodbye, Columbus; Portnoy's Complaint; The Human Stain; The Dying Animal, adapted as Elegy; The Humbling; Indignation; and American Pastoral. In addition, The Ghost Writer was adapted for television in 1984. In 2014 filmmaker Alex Ross Perry made Listen Up Philip, which was influenced by Roth's work. HBO dramatized Roth's The Plot Against America in 2020 as a six-part series starring Zoe Kazan, Winona Ryder, John Turturro, and Morgan Spector.

=== Honors ===
- 1960 National Book Award for Goodbye, Columbus
- 1960 National Jewish Book Award for Goodbye, Columbus
- 1975 National Book Award finalist for My Life as A Man
- 1978 NBCCA finalist for The Professor Of Desire
- 1980 Pulitzer Prize finalist for The Ghost Writer
- 1980 National Book Award finalist for The Ghost Writer
- 1980 NBCCA finalist for The Ghost Writer
- 1984 National Book Award finalist for The Anatomy Lesson
- 1984 NBCCA finalist for The Anatomy Lesson
- 1986 National Book Critics Circle Award (NBCCA) for The Counterlife
- 1987 National Book Award finalist for The Counterlife
- 1988 National Jewish Book Award for The Counterlife
- 1991 National Book Critics Circle Award (NBCCA) for Patrimony
- 1994 PEN/Faulkner Award for Operation Shylock
- 1994 Pulitzer Prize finalist for Operation Shylock
- 1995 National Book Award for Sabbath's Theater
- 1996 Pulitzer Prize finalist for Sabbath's Theater
- 1997 International Dublin Literary Award longlist for Sabbath's Theater
- 1998 Pulitzer Prize for American Pastoral
- 1998 NBCCA finalist for American Pastoral
- 1998 Ambassador Book Award of the English-Speaking Union for I Married a Communist
- 1998 National Medal of Arts
- 1999 International Dublin Literary Award longlist for American Pastoral
- 2000 Prix du Meilleur Livre Étranger (France) for American Pastoral
- 2000 International Dublin Literary Award shortlist for I Married a Communist
- 2000 National Jewish Book Award for The Human Stain
- 2001 Franz Kafka Prize
- 2001 PEN/Faulkner Award for The Human Stain
- 2001 Gold Medal In Fiction from The American Academy of Arts and Letters
- 2001 42nd Edward MacDowell Medal from the MacDowell Colony
- 2001 WH Smith Literary Award for The Human Stain
- 2002 International Dublin Literary Award longlist for The Human Stain
- 2002 Medal for Distinguished Contribution to American Letters from the National Book Foundation
- 2002 Prix Médicis Étranger (France) for The Human Stain
- 2005 NBCCA finalist for The Plot Against America
- 2005 Sidewise Award for Alternate History for The Plot Against America
- 2005 James Fenimore Cooper Prize for Best Historical Fiction for The Plot Against America
- 2005 Nominee for Man Booker International Prize
- 2005 WH Smith Literary Award for The Plot Against America
- 2006 PEN/Nabokov Award for lifetime achievement
- 2007 PEN/Faulkner Award for Everyman
- 2007 PEN/Saul Bellow Award for Achievement in American Fiction
- 2008 International Dublin Literary Award longlist for Everyman
- 2009 International Dublin Literary Award longlist for Exit Ghost
- 2010 The Paris Review Hadada Prize
- 2011 National Humanities Medal for 2010
- 2011 Man Booker International Prize
- 2012 Library of Congress Creative Achievement Award for Fiction
- 2012 Prince of Asturias Awards for literature
- 2013 PEN/Allen Foundation Literary Service Award for lifetime achievement and advocacy.
- 2013 Commander of the Legion of Honor by the Republic of France.

== Honorary degrees ==
Location	Date	School	Degree
Pennsylvania	1979	Bucknell University	Doctorate
New York	1985	Bard College	Doctor of Letters (D.Litt.)
New York	May 20, 1987	Columbia University	Doctor of Humane Letters (DHL)
New Jersey	May 21, 1987	Rutgers University	Doctor of Humane Letters (DHL)
Rhode Island	2001	Brown University	Doctor of Letters (D.Litt.)
Pennsylvania	2003	University of Pennsylvania	Doctor of Humane Letters (DHL)
Massachusetts	June 5, 2003	Harvard University	Doctor of Humane Letters (DHL)
New York	May 22, 2014	Jewish Theological Seminary of America	Doctorate

== Legacy ==
John Updike, considered by many Roth's chief literary rival, said in 2008, "He's scarily devoted to the novelist's craft... [he] seems more dedicated in a way to the act of writing as a means of really reshaping the world to your liking. But he's been very good to have around as far as goading me to become a better writer." Roth spoke at Updike's memorial service, saying, "He is and always will be no less a national treasure than his 19th-century precursor, Nathaniel Hawthorne." After Updike's memorial at the New York Public Library, Roth told Charles McGrath, "I dream about John sometimes. He's standing behind me, watching me write." Asked who was better, Roth said, "John had more talent, but I think maybe I got more out of the talent I had." McGrath agreed with that assessment, adding that Updike might be the better stylist, but Roth's work was more consistent and "much funnier". McGrath added that in the 1990s Roth "underwent a kind of sea change and, borne aloft by that extraordinary second wind, produced some of his very best work": Sabbath's Theater and the American Trilogy (American Pastoral, I Married a Communist, and The Human Stain). Another admirer of Roth's work is Bruce Springsteen. Roth read Springsteen's autobiography, Born to Run, and Springsteen praised Roth's American Trilogy: "I'll tell you, those three recent books by Philip Roth just knocked me on my ass.... To be in his sixties making work that is so strong, so full of revelations about love and emotional pain, that's the way to live your artistic life. Sustain, sustain, sustain."

Roth left his book collection and more than $2 million to the Newark Public Library. In 2021, the Philip Roth Personal Library opened for public viewing in the Newark Public Library. In April 2021, W. W. Norton & Company published Blake Bailey's authorized biography of Roth, Philip Roth: The Biography. Publication was halted two weeks after release due to sexual assault allegations against Bailey. Three weeks later, in May 2021, Skyhorse Publishing announced that it would release a paperback, ebook, and audiobook versions of the biography. Roth had asked his executors "to destroy many of his personal papers after the publication of the semi-authorized biography on which Blake Bailey had recently begun work.... Roth wanted to ensure that Bailey, who was producing exactly the type of biography he wanted, would be the only person outside a small circle of intimates permitted to access personal, sensitive manuscripts, including the unpublished Notes for My Biographer (a 295-page rebuttal to his ex-wife's memoir) and Notes on a Slander-Monger (another rebuttal, this time to a biographical effort from Bailey's predecessor). 'I don't want my personal papers dragged all over the place,' Roth said. The fate of Roth's personal papers took on new urgency in the wake of Norton's decision to halt distribution of the biography. In May 2021, the Philip Roth Society published an open letter imploring Roth's executors 'to preserve these documents and make them readily available to researchers.'"

After Roth's death, Harold Bloom told the Library of America: "Philip Roth's departure is a dark day for me and for many others. His two greatest novels, American Pastoral and Sabbath's Theater, have a controlled frenzy, a high imaginative ferocity, and a deep perception of America in the days of its decline. The Zuckerman tetralogy remains fully alive and relevant, and I should mention too the extraordinary invention of Operation Shylock, the astonishing achievement of The Counterlife, and the pungency of The Plot Against America. His My Life as a Man still haunts me. In one sense Philip Roth is the culmination of the unsolved riddle of Jewish literature in the twentieth and twenty-first centuries. The complex influences of Kafka and Freud and the malaise of American Jewish life produced in Philip a new kind of synthesis. Pynchon aside, he must be estimated as the major American novelist since Faulkner."

The New York Times asked several prominent authors to name their favorite work by Roth. The responses were varied; Jonathan Safran Foer chose Patrimony, Roth's memoir of his father's illness: "Much has been written about Roth since he died. In keeping with the unseemliness of our profession, we all have something to say. The responses have overflowed with a kind of blunt adoration that would be perfectly un-Rothlike if they weren't the efforts of children agonizing over the right way to bury our father. None of it feels right, perhaps because nothing could. Roth's words dressed his father for death, and they dressed so many of us for life. How does one properly acknowledge that? How does one say thank you for the thousand almost-invisible preparations? This morning, as I was getting my children dressed for school, I felt the profound gratitude of a 'little son.'"

Joyce Carol Oates told The Guardian: "Philip Roth was a slightly older contemporary of mine. We had come of age in more or less the same repressive 50s era in America—formalist, ironic, 'Jamesian', a time of literary indirection and understatement, above all impersonality—as the high priest TS Eliot had preached: 'Poetry is an escape from personality.' Boldly, brilliantly, at times furiously, and with an unsparing sense of the ridiculous, Philip repudiated all that. He did revere Kafka—but Lenny Bruce as well. (In fact, the essential Roth is just that anomaly: Kafka riotously interpreted by Lenny Bruce.) But there was much more to Philip than furious rebellion. For at heart he was a true moralist, fired to root out hypocrisy and mendacity in public life as well as private. Few saw The Plot Against America as actual prophecy, but here we are. He will abide."

== Further reading and literary criticism ==
- Balint, Benjamin, "Philip Roth's Counterlives," Books & Ideas, May 5, 2014.
- Bloom, Harold, ed., Modern Critical Views of Philip Roth, Chelsea House, New York, 2003.
- Bloom, Harold and Welsch, Gabe, eds., Modern Critical Interpretations of Philip Roth's Portnoy's Complaint. Broomall, Penn.: Chelsea House, 2003.
- Cooper, Alan, Philip Roth and the Jews (SUNY Series in Modern Jewish Literature and Culture). Albany: SUNY Press, 1996.
- Dean, Andrew. Metafiction and the Postwar Novel: Foes, Ghosts, and Faces in the Water, Oxford University Press, Oxford, 2021.
- Finkielkraut, Alain, "La plaisanterie" [on The Human Stain], in Un coeur intelligent. Paris: Stock/Flammarion, 2009.
- Finkielkraut, Alain, "La complainte du désamour" (on The Professor of Desire), in Et si l'amour durait. Paris: Stock, 2011.
- Hayes, Patrick. Philip Roth: Fiction and Power, Oxford University Press, Oxford, 2014.
- Kinzel, Till, Die Tragödie und Komödie des amerikanischen Lebens. Eine Studie zu Zuckermans Amerika in Philip Roths Amerika-Trilogie (American Studies Monograph Series). Heidelberg: Universitaetsverlag Winter, 2006.
- Miceli, Barbara, 'Escape from the Corpus: The Pain of Writing and Illness in Philip Roth's The Anatomy Lesson' in Bootheina Majoul and Hanen Baroumi, The Poetics and Hermeuetics of Pain and Pleasure, Cambridge Scholars Publishing, 2022: 55–62.
- Milowitz, Steven, Philip Roth Considered: The Concentrationary Universe of the American Writer. New York: Routledge, 2000.
- Morley, Catherine, The Quest for Epic in Contemporary American Literature. New York: Routledge, 2008.
- Parrish, Timothy, ed., The Cambridge Companion to Philip Roth. Cambridge: Cambridge University Press, 2007.
- Pierpont, Claudia Roth Roth Unbound: A Writer and His Books. New York: Farrar, Straus and Giroux, 2013.
- Podhoretz, Norman, "The Adventures of Philip Roth," Commentary (October 1998), reprinted as "Philip Roth, Then and Now" in The Norman Podhoretz Reader. New York: Free Press, 2004.
- Posnock, Ross, Philip Roth's Rude Truth: The Art of Immaturity. Princeton: Princeton University Press, 2006.
- Remnick, David (March 29, 2021). "When he was good: a life of Philip Roth". The Critics. Books. The New Yorker. 97 (6): 62–69. (Note: Online version is titled "The secrets Philip Roth didn't keep".)
- Royal, Derek Parker, Philip Roth: New Perspectives on an American Author. Santa Barbara: Praeger, 2005.
- Safer, Elaine B., Mocking the Age: The Later Novels of Philip Roth (SUNY Series in Modern Jewish Literature and Culture). Albany: SUNY Press, 2006.
- Schmitt, Sebastian, Fifties Nostalgia in Selected Novels of Philip Roth (MOSAIC: Studien und Texte zur amerikanischen Kultur und Geschichte, Vol. 60). Trier: Wissenschaftlicher Verlag Trier, 2017 (Open Access: https://www.wvt-online.com/media/9783868217407.pdf).
- Searles, George J., ed., Conversations With Philip Roth. Jackson: University of Mississippi Press, 1992.
- Searles, George J., The Fiction of Philip Roth and John Updike. Carbondale: Southern Illinois University Press, 1984.
- Shostak, Debra B., Philip Roth: Countertexts, Counterlives. Columbia: University of South Carolina Press, 2004.
- Simic, Charles, "The Nicest Boy in the World," The New York Review of Books 55, no. 15 (October 9, 2008): 4–7.
- Swirski, Peter, "It Can't Happen Here, or Politics, Emotions, and Philip Roth's The Plot Against America." American Utopia and Social Engineering in Literature, Social Thought, and Political History. New York, Routledge, 2011.
- Taylor, Benjamin. Here We Are: My Friendship with Philip Roth. New York: Penguin Random House, 2020.
- Wolcott, James, "Sisyphus at the Selectric" (review of Blake Bailey, Philip Roth: The Biography, Cape, April 2021, 898 pp., ISBN 978-0-224-09817-5; Ira Nadel, Philip Roth: A Counterlife, Oxford, May 2021, 546 pp., ISBN 978-0-19-984610-8; and Benjamin Taylor, Here We Are: My Friendship with Philip Roth, Penguin, May 2020, 192 pp., ISBN 978-0-525-50524-2), London Review of Books, vol. 43, no. 10 (May 20, 2021), pp. 3, 5–10. Wolcott: "He's a great writer but is he a great writer? And what does 'great writer' mean now anyhow?" (p. 10.)
- Wöltje, Wiebke-Maria, My finger on the pulse of the nation: Intellektuelle Protagonisten im Romanwerk Philip Roths (Mosaic, 26). Trier: WVT, 2006.
- Zipperstein, Steven, Philip Roth: Stung by Life. Yale University Press, 2025.

———————
