= Portnoy's Complaint =

1969 novel by Philip Roth

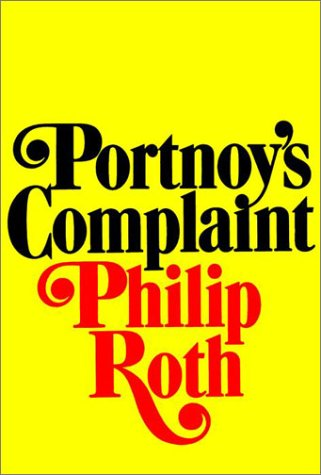
- First edition cover
- Author: Philip Roth
- Language: English
- Publisher: Random House
- Publication date: January 12, 1969
- Publication place: United States
- Media type: Print (hardcover)
- Pages: 274
- ISBN: 978-0394441986
- OCLC: 218657
- Preceded by: When She Was Good
- Followed by: Our Gang

Portnoy's Complaint is a 1969 American novel by Philip Roth. Its success turned Roth into a major celebrity, sparking a storm of controversy over its explicit and candid treatment of sexuality, including detailed depictions of masturbation using various props. The novel tells the humorous monologue of "a lust-ridden, mother-addicted young Jewish bachelor", who confesses to his psychoanalyst in "intimate, shameful detail, and coarse, abusive language."

In 1998, the Modern Library ranked Portnoy's Complaint 52nd on its list of the 100 best English-language novels of the 20th century. Time included this novel in its "TIME 100 Best English-language Novels from 1923 to 2005."

== Structure and themes ==
Structurally, Portnoy's Complaint is a continuous monologue by narrator Alexander Portnoy to Dr. Spielvogel, his psychoanalyst; Roth later explained that the artistic choice to frame the story as a psychoanalytic session was motivated by "the permissive conventions of the patient-analyst situation," which would "permit me to bring into my fiction the sort of intimate, shameful detail, and coarse, abusive language that ... in another fictional environment would have struck me as pornographic, exhibitionistic, and nothing but obscene."

The novel is set primarily in New Jersey from the 1940s to the 1960s. Portnoy is "a lust-ridden, mother-addicted young Jewish bachelor", and the narration weaves through time describing scenes from each stage of his life; every recollection in some way touches upon his central dilemma: his inability to enjoy the fruits of his sexual adventures even as his extreme libidinal urges force him to seek release in ever more creative (and, in his mind, degrading and shameful) acts of eroticism; also, much of his dilemma is that "his sense of himself, his past, and his ridiculous destiny is so fixed." Roth is not subtle about defining this as the main theme of his book. On the first page of the novel, one finds this clinical definition of "Portnoy's Complaint", as if taken from a manual on sexual dysfunction:

Portnoy's Complaint: A disorder in which strongly felt ethical and altruistic impulses perpetually are warring with extreme sexual longings, often of a perverse nature ...

The title also alludes to the common literary form of complaint, such as "A Lover's Complaint", which typically presents the speaker's comments on being a spurned lover. Other topics touched on in the book include the assimilation experiences of American Jews, their relationship to the Jews of Israel, and the pleasures and perils the narrator sees as inherent in being the son of a Jewish family. Portnoy's Complaint is emblematic of the times during which it was published. The book's sexual frankness was a product of and a reflection on the sexual revolution of the late 1960s. The book's narrative style, a departure from the stately, semi-Jamesian prose of Roth's earlier novels, has been likened to the stand-up performances of 1960s comedian Lenny Bruce. The novel is notable for its explicit and candid treatment of sexuality, including detailed depictions of masturbation using various props including a piece of liver which Portnoy's mother later serves for dinner.

== Writing ==
Roth had begun work on Portnoy's Complaint in 1967, before publication of his novel When She Was Good that year. The piece had its genesis in a satirical monologue Roth had written to accompany a slide show proposed for inclusion in the risqué revue Oh! Calcutta! that would focus on the sexual organs of the rich and famous. While the slide show never came to fruition, Roth found part of the accompanying monologue about masturbation salvageable. Roth re-fashioned the material for the novel and sold a chapter of the book, entitled "Whacking Off", to Partisan Review. Progress on the novel was slow because Roth was suffering from writer's block, relating to his ex-wife, Margaret Martinson and the unpleasant prospect that any royalties generated by the novel would have to be split equally with her. In May 1968, Martinson was killed in a car crash in Central Park. Roth's writer's block lifted and following Martinson's funeral, he traveled to the Yaddo literary retreat to complete the manuscript.

== Responses, reviews and attacks ==
The publication of the novel caused controversy in American public discourse. The two aspects that evoked outrage were its explicit and candid treatment of sexuality and obscenities, including detailed depictions of masturbation, which was revolutionary in the late 1960s, and the irreverent portrait of Jewish identity. It caused uproar in the Jewish community, including among New York intellectuals such as Irving Howe and Diana Trilling.

== Censorship ==
In 1969 the book was declared a "prohibited import" in Australia. Penguin Books, the Australian publisher, circumvented the importation ban by having copies printed in Sydney in secret and stored in fleets of moving trucks to avoid seizure under state obscenity laws. A 1967 agreement between the Commonwealth of Australia and its states had put in place a uniform censorship effort against books on the federal banned books list. According to this agreement, books that were imported into the country would be handled by the Commonwealth, while the states would police local publication and distribution, using state laws to prosecute. However, South Australia bucked the system when it came to Portnoy's Complaint, declaring that it would not prosecute sales of the work made to an adult who made a direct enquiry of the vendor, provided the books were kept behind the counter.

Attempts to prosecute Penguin and any bookseller carrying the book were successful in Victoria and Queensland, but failed in Western Australia (where "works of recognised artistic, scientific or literary merit" were immune under the local statute, notwithstanding that they may have been obscene) and New South Wales, where prosecutors gave up after two trials resulted in hung juries. The book was removed from the federal banned list for importation in June 1971, the federal government recognising the absurdity that local publications could be sold legally in three states and the Australian Capital Territory. The Portnoy matter was a watershed in Australian censorship law, marking the last occasion on which the censorship of a literary publication came before the courts. Many libraries in the United States banned the book because of its detailed discussion of masturbation and its explicit language.

== Film adaptation ==
In 1972, the novel was adapted into a film written and directed by Ernest Lehman, and starring Richard Benjamin and Karen Black.
