= The Library of America's definitive edition of Philip Roth's collected works =

The Library of America's definitive edition of Philip Roth's collected works (2005–2017) is a series collecting Philip Roth's works. The Library of America's aim is to collect and republish all of Roth's literary output. Originally envisioned as an eight-volume series, the revised plan presents Roth's oeuvre in ten volumes. First published in 2005, ten volumes have been published as of 2017. All were edited by Ross Miller, except the last one, by Roth himself, although reportedly the chronology and dust jacket copy were in fact authored by Roth himself under Miller's name.

== Volume 1: Novels and Stories 1959–1962 ==
LOA #157: Published August 18, 2005, ISBN 978-1-931082-79-2, 913 pages

- Goodbye, Columbus (1959)
- Letting Go (1962)

== Volume 2: Novels 1967–1972 ==
LOA #158: Published August 18, 2005, ISBN 978-1-931082-80-8, 671 pages

- When She Was Good (1967)
- Portnoy's Complaint (1969)
- Our Gang (1971)
- The Breast (1972)

== Volume 3: Novels 1973–1977 ==
LOA #165: Published October 19, 2006, ISBN 978-1-931082-96-9, 900 pages

- The Great American Novel (1973)
- My Life As a Man (1974)
- The Professor of Desire (1977)

== Volume 4: Zuckerman Bound: A Trilogy & Epilogue 1979–1985 ==
LOA #175: Published September 20, 2007, ISBN 978-1-59853-011-7, 675 pages

- The Ghost Writer (1979)
- Zuckerman Unbound (1981)
- The Anatomy Lesson (1983)
- The Prague Orgy (1985)
- Unproduced television screenplay for The Prague Orgy (1985)

== Volume 5: Novels and Other Narratives 1986–1991 ==
LOA #185: Published September 4, 2008, ISBN 978-1-59853-030-8, 767 pages

- The Counterlife (1986)
- The Facts (1988)
- Deception (1990)
- Patrimony (1991)

== Volume 6: Novels 1993–1995 ==
LOA #205: Published September 2, 2010, ISBN 978-1-59853-078-0, 842 pages

- Operation Shylock (1993)
- Sabbath's Theater (1995)

== Volume 7: The American Trilogy 1997–2000 ==
LOA #220: Published September 29, 2011, ISBN 978-1-59853-103-9, 1088 pages

- American Pastoral (1997)
- I Married a Communist (1998)
- The Human Stain (2000)

== Volume 8: Novels 2001–2007 ==
LOA #236: Published February 7, 2013, ISBN 978-1-59853-198-5, 740 pages

- The Dying Animal (2001)
- The Plot Against America (2004)
- Exit Ghost (2007)

== Volume 9: Nemeses ==
LOA #237: Published February 7, 2013, ISBN 978-1-59853-199-2, 598 pages

- Everyman (2006)
- Indignation (2008)
- The Humbling (2009)
- Nemesis (2010)

== Volume 10: Why Write?: Collected Nonfiction 1960–2013 ==
LOA #300: Published September 12, 2017, ISBN 978-1-59853-540-2, 476 pages

- Roth’s selection of Reading Myself and Others (1975)
- Shop Talk (2001)
- Explanations (fourteen later pieces)
