= Operation Shylock =

1993 novel by Philip Roth

- First edition cover
- Author: Philip Roth
- Language: English
- Genre: Fiction; Autobiographical fiction Spy fiction
- Publisher: Simon & Schuster
- Publication date: 8 April 1993
- Publication place: United States
- Pages: 398
- ISBN: 0-671-70376-5
- OCLC: 27034867

Operation Shylock: A Confession is a 1993 novel by American novelist Philip Roth. The novel is presented as a first-person narrative by the author, following him on a trip to Israel and describing how he undertook the titular "operation" for the Israeli intelligence service.

Deliberately blurring the boundaries between fact and fiction, the novel explores themes of the nature of the self, Jewish identity in Israel and the diaspora, and the relationship of an author to their work.

On publication, the novel was controversial due to its postmodern devices, ostensible self-obsession and its treatment of the Israeli–Arab conflict, but has been the subject of renewed interest and acclaim since. It received the 1994 PEN/Faulkner Award for best novel.

== Plot ==
The novel follows narrator "Philip Roth" on a journey to Israel, where he attends the trial of accused war criminal John Demjanjuk and becomes involved in an intelligence mission—the "Operation Shylock" of the title.

The book begins with the narrator recovering from a three month emotional collapse driven by side effects of the sedative Halcion. Undertaking to travel to Israel to interview Israeli author Aharon Appelfeld, he is side-tracked by the news that an impersonator has appropriated his identity. The impersonator has Roth's facial features, goes by the same name, and uses Roth's status as a celebrity author to spread "Diasporism", a counter-Zionist ideology advocating the return to Europe of all Ashkenazi Jews in Israel in order to avert a second Holocaust by Arab countries.

The ensuing struggle between this doppelgänger-like stranger and "Roth", played against the backdrop of the Demjanjuk trial and the First Intifada, constitutes the book's primary storyline. Roth becomes romantically involved with Jinx Possesski, his doppelgänger's lover and partner in crime. He also has several face-to-face confrontations with his double; each time, the other "Philip Roth" (whom Roth dubs "Moishe Pipik") accuses him of taking his fame too lightly, and eschewing his responsibilities to people in the real world.

Because the central proposition of "Diasporism" is highly amenable to the PLO, a Palestinian graduate school friend of Philip's named George Ziad attempts to put Roth in contact with the actual PLO. Ziad believes Philip is the one expounding diasporism, unaware of Pipik's impersonation. Roth intends to refuse until he is kidnapped by Louis B. Smilesburger, an agent of the Mossad, Israel's intelligence agency. He urges him to accept Ziad's offer, so that Philip can gather intelligence for Israel.

Roth apparently does so, but the end of the book reveals that Operation Shylock is (supposedly) missing an excised chapter where Roth describes the details and outcome of his Mossad mission.

== Main characters ==
=== Philip Roth (Philip) ===
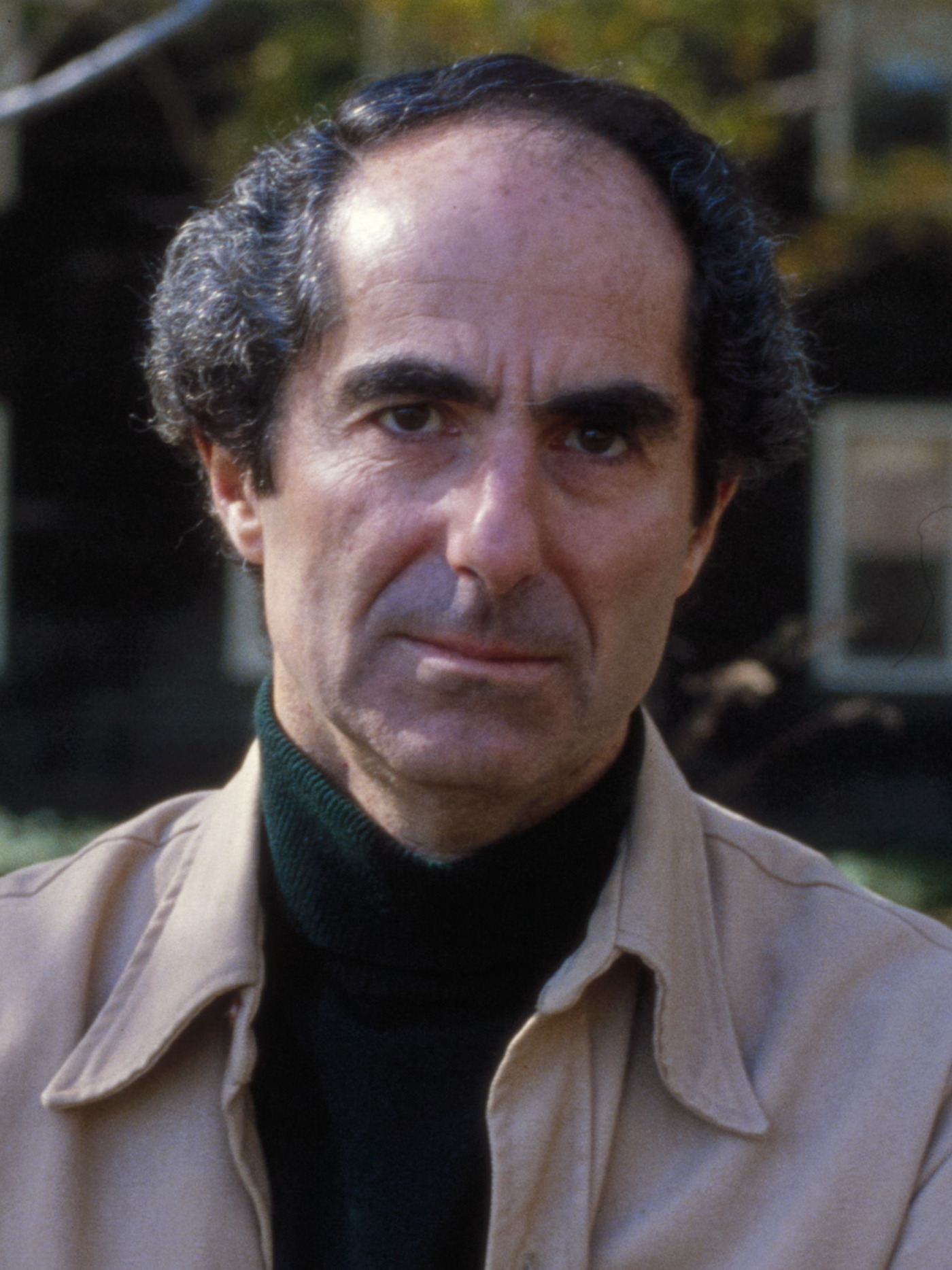
Roth in the 1980s

Purportedly the real life Philip Roth, a famous Jewish American author in his fifties. He is the unreliable narrator of the novel.

=== Philip Roth (Moishe Pipik) ===
A former private detective who bears a striking resemblance to the author Philip Roth, as well as sharing the same name. He is devoted to and consumed by the ideology of "diasporism", which seeks to repatriate Ashkenazi Jews from Israel to their European countries of origin. Once physically imposing, he is terminally ill with cancer and uses a penile implant after surgery has left him impotent. Jinx Possesski is his lover.

=== Wanda Jane "Jinx" Possesski ===
Pipik's lover, and formerly his nurse at the hospital where he was being treated for cancer. Possesski is a "recovering anti-Semite"; a member of Pipik's "Anti-Semites Anonymous" group.

=== Aharon Appelfeld ===
A real Israeli author, whose fiction often relates to his childhood experiences in the Holocaust. Appelfeld represents an Israeli "counterself" to Philip in the novel, more so than his ostensible double Pipik does.

=== John Demjanjuk ===
A real Ukrainian-born Ohio mechanic in his sixties, on trial in Jerusalem for committing atrocities at Treblinka death camp during the Holocaust.

=== Louis B. Smilesburger ===
A genial but cunning agent of the Israeli Mossad. He first appears as decrepit and elderly, using crutches to navigate, and presents himself as a supporter of Pipik's diasporism. He later reveals his actual role and intentions, describing himself as a "ruthless man working in a ruthless job for a ruthless country".

=== George Ziad ===
A college friend of Philip's who remembers him as "Zee", a suave Egyptian ladies' man. Philip encounters him and discovers that he is in fact Palestinian, and that he has left the comfort of American academia for "a life of continuous eloquent hatred for demonized arrogant occupying Israelis" in Ramallah. According to Philip Hensher, he is a "thinly disguised Edward Said" though Roth has denied this.

== Development history ==
In 1984, Roth met the Israeli novelist Aharon Appelfeld. Over the following years, the two became good friends, with Roth traveling to Jerusalem in February 1988 to interview Appelfeld about his books. This discussion was published in both The New York Times and the London Review of Books the following month. The novel's Jerusalem scenes incorporate these real-world events, with the novel's narrator traveling to Jerusalem intending to interview Appelfeld and attending the trial of accused war criminal John Demjanjuk in the process.

=== Publication history ===
The novel was published in 1993 by Simon & Schuster in the United States and Jonathan Cape in England. That same year, the Franklin Library published a limited edition version featuring an introduction written by Roth. In 1994, Random House published a paperback version of the novel for their Vintage Books series.

== Analysis ==
Operation Shylock is one of the "Philip Roth Books"–novels by Roth in which the main character is named Philip Roth; these also include non-fiction works The Facts: A Novelist's Autobiography and Patrimony and novels Deception and The Plot Against America. Operation Shylock is also, together with The Counterlife, one of Roth's two "Israel novels".

The association between Roth and his protagonists is one of the characteristic features of Roth's writing. Roth has expressed frustration with the way people have read his fictional protagonists as stand-ins for the author, but also deliberately employed the effect of giving the impression of "confession".

Operation Shylock also directly addresses the subjectivity, indeterminacy and fragmentation of the self. Protagonist Philip's Halcion-induced breakdown is described as a process of mental "self-disintegration" or coming apart. The internal challenge to the coherence of Roth's self is compounded by the external challenge when Philip discovers he is being impersonated by "Moishe Pipik". Philip's decision in turn to impersonate Pipik emphasises that the self is contingent and improvised. Philip's recovery from disintegration means he is eventually able to tell Pipik in earnest "I am Philip Roth and you are Philip Roth".

At the same time, the narrative is set against the backdrop of the trial of John Demjanjuk, which revolves around a differently contested claim of identity–whether Demjanjuk had been Ivan the Terrible, a notoriously monstrous guard at the Nazi extermination camp of Treblinka. Considering the seemingly mutually excluding lives of a Nazi war criminal and a peaceful family man in Ohio, Philip concludes that Demjanjuk is not unusual in this regard, and indeed that many Nazis had managed to enjoy the duality of war criminal and "family man" simultaneously.

Intersecting with the book's concern with the multiplicity of the self is the presentation of multiple modes of understanding Jewishness and its relationship to Israel. Pipik's Diasporism foresees the hostility of Israel's Arab neighbors as presaging a new Holocaust, the reverse of the Zionist conception of Israel as a safe haven. Palestinian George Ziad insists that the American Jew is authentic and apex of Jewish qualities as opposed to the Israeli Jew. Conversely, Mossad agent Smilesburger appeals to Philip's loyalty as a Jew, both to engage in a covert mission for the state of Israel, and afterwards to excise its details from the book. All make moral and political claims on Philip, who finds that though he is sympathetic to Pipik's and Ziad's arguments, he accedes to the demands of the Israeli.

=== Purported veracity ===
The relationship between fact and fiction is a theme of all the "Philip Roth" books. Operation Shylock destabilizes the dichotomy between the two, anchoring a clearly surreal narrative in a real historical and personal context. Several analyses of the book quote Roth in Deception, "I write fiction and I'm told it's autobiography, I write autobiography and I'm told it's fiction...let them decide what it is or isn't". Debra Shostak considers that the autobiographical presentation led readers to "want to know if the events, ranging from the plausible to the implausible, happened verifiably."

Roth maintained that many events from the book beyond the Appelfeld interview had happened in real life, though he also sometimes denied them. He told Esther Fein of The New York Times that he had been driven to despair by the sleeping pill Halcion, had worked in Athens as an Israeli spy, and had met in Jerusalem a double who was using his name. In the preface of the novel, Roth describes the book as an accurate account, but the closing "Note to the Reader" contradicts this and states that the book is a work of fiction; within the narrative, the Mossad officer Smilesburger urges Roth to append such a disclaimer. In March 1993 he described the imposter's appearance in Jerusalem as a crisis he had been "living rather than writing," while telling the San Francisco Examiner that the book "is not a novel." The Examiner was unable to find any corroborating evidence to his claims of a real-world double.

The post-operative nervous breakdown mentioned in the prologue and in other books by or about Roth was drawn from Roth's real-life experience of the temporary side-effects of a post-operative sedative (triazolam) which was later banned in several countries after discovery that the manufacturer had not published studies showing a high risk of short term psychiatric disturbance. In 2017, Roth objected to Wikipedia ascribing to the author the Triazolam-induced breakdown undergone by Operation Shylock's protagonist. He objected that "there is no way to conclude anything with certainty about the flesh-and-blood author from something that is said about a character in a novel".

== Reception ==
Despite high expectations and a seven-figure sum paid to Roth for a three-book contract, of which Operation Shylock was the first, it was not received warmly by critics. Roth's long-time professional acquaintance John Updike gave the novel a famously caustic review in The New Yorker. Updike found the book too full of argumentation, characters and long speeches. Updike closed with the admonition, "It should be read by anyone who cares about (1) Israel and its repercussions, (2) the development of the postmodern, deconstruction-minded novel, (3) Philip Roth." Norman Lebrecht similarly criticized the novel for "self-obsession", and said that it failed both as fiction and as autobiographical confession. Philip Hensher called the book an "immoral misuse of fiction", praising it as a technical achievement but castigating it for its portrayal of Palestinians and anti-Zionism.

In The New York Times Book Review, novelist and poet D. M. Thomas wrote that "the book carries the feeling of creative joy. One feels that Roth feels that he's let rip." In Time, Paul Gray observed "Roth has not riffed with quite this comic abandon since Portnoy’s Complaint. And the social and historical range of Operation Shylock is broader than anything the author has attempted before."

The novel appears to have grown in stature since publication. In 2006, when New York Times Book Review editor Sam Tanenhaus mailed a short letter to "a couple of hundred prominent writers, critics, editors," asking that they identify the best work of American fiction published in the preceding quarter-century, several respondents named Operation Shylock. (The eventual winner was Toni Morrison's 1987 Beloved.) Reporting upon Roth's reception of the 2011 Man Booker International Prize, critic Jonathan Derbyshire of the New Statesman wrote that while the prize's judges had referred to later works, "two slightly earlier novels stand out for me, both of them hectically metafictional works partly set in Israel: The Counterlife (1986) and Operation Shylock."

After Roth's death, The New York Times asked several prominent writers to name their favorite book by him. Daniel Mendelsohn cast his vote for Operation Shylock, writing that the book represented "a rise to new — and, I would say, philosophical — heights", in "a setting that amplifies the significance of Roth's favorite themes of identity and imposture, truth and fictionality, and gives the ostensibly zany, Quixote-esque plot an ultimately tragic historical resonance."

== Awards ==
Operation Shylock received the 1994 PEN/Faulkner Award for best novel. Roth would eventually become the first three-time winner of the award: for Shylock, 2001's The Human Stain, and 2007's Everyman.
