= A Doll's House (1973 Garland film) =

1973 British film by Patrick Garland

- US theatrical poster
- Directed by: Patrick Garland
- Screenplay by: Christopher Hampton
- Based on: A Doll's House; 1879 play by Henrik Ibsen
- Produced by: Hillard Elkins
- Starring: Claire Bloom; Anthony Hopkins; Ralph Richardson; Denholm Elliott; Anna Massey; Edith Evans
- Cinematography: Arthur Ibbetson
- Edited by: John Glen
- Music by: John Barry
- Production company: Elkins Productions
- Distributed by: Anglo EMI Film Distributors Limited
- Release date: 22 May 1973 (US)
- Running time: 105 minutes
- Country: United Kingdom
- Language: English

A Doll's House is a 1973 British drama film directed by Patrick Garland and starring Claire Bloom and Anthony Hopkins. It was written by Christopher Hampton, based on Henrik Ibsen's 1879 play of the same title.

== Plot ==
Nora Helmer is married to the authoritarian and controlling Torvald Helmer. The couple have a reasonably happy relationship until past actions and outside forces cause Nora to realise her situation may not be as idyllic as she once thought.

== Cast ==
- Claire Bloom as Nora Helmer
- Anthony Hopkins as Torvald Helmer
- Ralph Richardson as Dr. Peter Rank
- Denholm Elliott as Nils Krogstad
- Edith Evans as Anne-Marie
- Anna Massey as Kristine Linde
- Helen Blatch as Helen
- Kimberley Hampton as Bob Helmer
- Daphne Riggs as Old Woman
- Mark Summerfield as Ivar Helmer
- Stefanie Summerfield as Emmy Helmer

== Reception ==
The Monthly Film Bulletin wrote: "While remaining honourably faithful to Ibsen's text, Christopher Hampton has sought in his adaptation to eliminate its more out-dated locutions, with the result that the characters are slightly stranded in a linguistic limbo, outlining their very Victorian dilemmas in a language that is just a shade too modern for them. ... Claire Bloom gives an intelligent reading of the part, revealing from the outset the tensions behind Nora's performing skylark persona and thus paving the way for her sudden metamorphosis at the end. Even so, Nora remains a strangely unmoving heroine, perhaps because Ibsen's 'naturalism' (for which Patrick Garland, in adapting his Broadway production to the screen, shows a meek respect) looks painfully artificial when transposed to the more 'natural' medium of film. ... Despite the generally sensitive performances and unobtrusive camerawork, the film's overall effect is not so much of a group of people trapped in a tragedy of society's making as of a troupe of actors caught up in a mesh of outworn conventions."

Time Out wrote: "If the production wanders a little and suffers through the declamatory acting style, then the acuteness of the play itself is there to compensate. ... Richardson makes a completely credible Dr. Rank, Hopkins is solid as Torvald, and when Bloom forgets about performing she manages to speak with something like conviction."

Variety wrote: "What is good here is largely what was good in the 1971 Broadway production from which pic directly derives. ... Christopher Hampton's interpretation of Ibsen's text successfully lays down the original's creakier verbal anachronisms but leaves its excellent construction intact. Film, as does play, unfolds grippingly, like a first-rate murder mystery with a cosmic consciousness. ... But for all the high-quality performances, pic lacks excitement in film terms. Its creators have been highly respectful of their sources, and that may be ironically one of this entry's major problems at the marketplace."

Vincent Canby wrote in The New York Times: "The locus of the film remains the comfortably middle-class (and probably overheated) drawing room of the Helmer house, in a small city in Norway over a Christmas weekend. In spite of the excursions outside, the film largely succeeds because (in addition to the fine performances) we experience, along with Nora, the sense of physical confinement, something that comes naturally in a one-set play and is likely to be lost when a one-set play is opened up. ... At first simply beautiful and single-mindedly silly, Miss Bloom evolves with the play itself, and with very classy support from among others, Denholm Elliott as the fidgety, not really dishonorable blackmailer, and from Sir Ralph Richardson as Dr. Rank, the family friend who is dying of congenital syphilis. Anna Massey is equally fine in the generally impossible role of confidante to Nora, Dame Edith Evans is as much a symbol of English theater as she is the ancient nurse of Nora, but that's all right too."

The British Film Institute called the film one of the "ten great British films of 1973", writing "The fact that not one but two film adaptations of Ibsen’s masterpiece were produced in 1973 speaks to the renewed interest in the play in the context of second wave feminism. ... the intensity of the piece is better captured in Patrick Garland’s version. ... It boasts a superb Claire Bloom reprising a role that affected her so deeply that she titled her 1996 memoir after the play, and doing so with sterling support from Anthony Hopkins and Anna Massey."

The film was nominated for the Best Supporting Actor (Denholm Elliott) and Best Costume Design (Beatrice Dawson) at the 27th British Academy Film Awards. The film also won Best Actress (Claire Bloom) and was nominated for the Golden Charybdis at the Taormina Film Fest.
