= Leaving a Doll's House =

1996 autobiography of Claire Bloom

Leaving a Doll's House: A Memoir
- Author: Claire Bloom
- Language: English
- Genre: Autobiography
- Publisher: Virago Press (London), Little, Brown (New York)
- Publication date: 1996
- Publication place: United Kingdom
- Pages: 269

Leaving a Doll's House: A Memoir is an autobiography written by British actress Claire Bloom and published in 1996. Bloom writes about her life, career and relationships, including her first marriage to Rod Steiger. The main focus is on her troubled relationship with writer Philip Roth.

== Title ==
The title refers to Henrik Ibsen's play A Doll's House, in which Bloom had starred on stage and in film as the wife in an oppressive marriage.

== Outline ==
=== Relationship with Philip Roth ===
Bloom first met Roth in 1966, when they were both in earlier relationships. "To have such a mind as Philip Roth's fixed on your every word and gesture is both daunting and extremely flattering", she recalled of this first encounter. The couple finally began their relationship in 1975, and started living together at an early stage.

The details Bloom shared in Leaving a Doll's House were unflattering to Roth, and created a controversy regarding the true nature of their relationship. Bloom gives details of Roth's illnesses, such as occluded arteries and an unsuccessful operation on his knee. These conditions caused him great pain and resulted in his insomnia, lack of concentration, and when he found sleep, nightmares and ultimately a breakdown due in part, Bloom believes, to the drug Halcion. Bloom did her best to support Roth during his difficulties, but their marriage began to disintegrate. To Bloom's regret, believing that they had spent some of their happiest times there, Roth turned against London and England, and the couple moved to New York. Despite a productive collaboration devising a programme of one-woman Shakespeare performances called Then Let Men Know which involved Bloom presenting studies of Shakespearean female characters and saw her receive transatlantic bookings, cracks were showing in their relationship.

Having received an unexpected piece of good news, Bloom went to visit Roth in his studio two blocks away from their home, only to find his reaction 'cold, alarmed and unwelcoming'. Roth gave Bloom his novel Deception to read at a later stage than usual and Bloom found in it an unflattering description of an Anglo-Jewish family, clearly based on her own, and graphic descriptions of the protagonist's promiscuity which Bloom was uncertain were entirely fabricated. Then came the description of the protagonist's actress wife, called Claire, whose chief characteristics are being boring, middle-aged and constantly bemoaning the youth of his mistresses. Bloom's reaction was to find this portrait "nasty and insulting" and the use of her name "completely unacceptable". Roth returned home bearing expensive jewellery as a "guilt offering"; Bloom demanded that her name be removed from the text, to which Roth finally agreed.

Roth's medical condition deteriorated to the extent that he was rushed into intensive care and placed on a life-support machine. He slowly improved, however, and even his father's death at that time did not set back his recovery. In January 1990, one year after his operation, Bloom asked Roth to marry her, a union which she described as being "of immense significance" to her. Roth contemplated her proposal for a few weeks then accepted via a "charming" note and they were married on 19 April 1990. Bloom describes that she was so happy with his acceptance that she chose to sign and ignore the implications of an "insult" pre-nuptial which Roth had drawn up and which made no provision for his wife should he seek divorce, which in the terms of the pre-nuptial agreement, he was free to do at any time and at will. This document was later to be described by Bloom's lawyer as "unconscionable, the most brutal document of its kind he had ever encountered".

Initially their marriage was harmonious and improved their relationship, but Bloom describes how in the second year it began to deteriorate as Roth withdrew emotionally: "Perhaps too much harmony had become an obstacle to his creativity". Roth had always had an uneasy relationship with Bloom's daughter Anna (from her marriage to Rod Steiger), and this provided a flashpoint. Despite their having seemed to reach an entente, after one of Anna Steiger's visits Roth communicated to Bloom via letter that her future visits should be curtailed to one week per year and that she should not stay in the couple's apartment in New York. Bloom reached an uneasy compromise by keeping Roth's letter secret from Anna while continuing to let her stay at the apartment in New York, which she considered hers as much as Roth's. When Bloom considered buying a small holiday cottage in Italy, Roth made "dire" predictions about her financial future and grave insinuations about their marriage. Around this time Bloom also discovered Roth had taped one of their phone conversations.

However, as Roth worked on his novel Operation Shylock, believing it to be his masterpiece, their fortunes improved, with Roth hosting to perfection a large and emotional 62nd birthday party for Bloom. Bloom then accompanied him on what turned out to be a successful book tour to promote Operation Shylock, with Roth having developed a fear of public reading and grateful of her support.

=== Deterioration of relationship with Roth ===
Bloom continued to support Roth as his hoped-for masterpiece produced disappointing reviews and sales. As they retreated to their Connecticut house, Roth fell into a depression, which caused extremes of emotion and severe mood swings during which he could alternately be extremely loving or cruel. Their marriage began to disintegrate; Bloom writes that a main concern during this bleak time of Roth's emotional volatility was self-preservation.

Ultimately, Roth committed himself to psychiatric care at Silver Hill Hospital. Despite seeming initially reconciliatory when he summoned Bloom to visit, Roth described himself as very angry with her and recited a prepared list of her faults, such as 'odd' behaviour in restaurants, looking at her watch and humming to herself, and remarking that it was a pity his father couldn't control himself when he lost control of his bowels. Bloom felt Roth had scrutinised every mistake she made in their seventeen years together, although she expressed regret for commenting on his father's situation. This culminated with Roth saying that if Anna was coming to New York for three months, which was planned so she could study with an opera teacher in New York (Anna is a professional singer), he would terminate the marriage. Bloom reported to the hospital for more sessions (overseen by a Dr. Bloch) over a period of several days, which she described as the "most brutal" of her life, trying to reason with Roth and save their marriage.

After Roth left the hospital, Bloom describes herself as experiencing a near breakdown and acting in a distressed and desperate manner. Roth stated that he did not wish to see her and offered her money not to stay at their apartment in New York while he recovered there. Bloom, meanwhile, had accepted an offer to act in a film in Dublin, but was so distressed that the acting experience was a disaster. Roth then contacted Bloom to indicate he would like to resume their relationship at a suitable juncture. This was a time of upheaval and misfortune for Bloom; Anna had recently been at a bank when it was the target of an armed robbery, and Bloom had sold her home of 20 years in London. A visit to Roth on the night before he left Silver Hill ended in Roth furiously verbally attacking Bloom. Bloom herself was admitted to the hospital as a patient after Roth's outburst caused her to have a breakdown and tell a duty nurse that she wanted to die.

Bloom left the hospital the day after she was admitted, but the turbulent times continued, Roth alternating between loving gestures and mental cruelty. Bloom suspected on several occasions he was trying to set her up to provide incriminating evidence, and her own behaviour alternated between rational and hysterical. Ultimately, after having sent flowers followed shortly by a letter requesting separation, Roth filed for divorce, citing Bloom for "cruel and inhuman" treatment.

During the proceedings, a complex game of manipulation and emotional blackmail that Roth had been playing with a friend of Bloom's emerged which demonstrated both Roth's willingness to commit infidelity and to destroy friendships close to Bloom.

Bloom vacillated between a need to provide financial security for herself and a desire not to render a reconciliation with Roth impossible. This undermined her settlement claim and she ended up settling, against her lawyer's advice, for what was considered to be a modest sum of $100,000.

Subsequently, Roth sent Bloom a "fusillade" of faxes one evening demanding return of everything he provided during their years together including $150 per hour for the "five or six hundred hours" he spent going over scripts with her and levying a fine of $62 billion for Bloom's failure to honour the pre-nuptial agreement. Bloom also writes of Roth demanding the return of jewelry given as gifts during their relationship, though his priority seemed to be money. "Just send a cheque" he wrote. Roth concluded by offering to give Bloom the $104 per week that had been paid to the maid in New York, which he claimed was Bloom's "sole contribution to living costs that averaged between $80,000 and $100,000 per year." Eventually Roth returned some, though Bloom states not all, of the items on a list she had given him of her belongings still in his possession.

Their divorce was finalised in June 1995.

=== Life after Roth ===
After the divorce, Bloom's most pressing concern was money. Out of financial necessity and against her inclinations, she accepted a part in CBS soap opera As the World Turns. Bloom also describes a reliance on anti-depressants in this period. She writes of discovering that Roth began a relationship with their mutual friend "Erda" (a pseudonym) during their marriage. This relationship lasted a few months beyond the end of Roth and Bloom's marriage and Bloom writes of meeting Erda after some time elapsed and discovering the similarities between their relationships with Roth. Though Bloom's lasted eighteen years, with Erda "the process had simply accelerated".

Bloom extensively analyzes her relationship with Roth. She notes his comment that his longest relationships tended to be with fatherless women. Bloom believes this is not a coincidence as such women "gravitate towards emotionally unavailable men". She concludes "Notwithstanding our own professional achievements, there were undeveloped dark regions in us both that proved to be insurmountable obstacles."

Bloom later appeared in the 1995 Sylvester Stallone film Daylight, which she describes as "film-making at its harshest and least glamorous."

== Responses ==
Dinitia Smith, reporting for The New York Times a month before publication, commented that "the gossip is considerable", although Bloom was then contractually unable to comment, and Roth and his agent Andrew Wylie were not responding to contact. Patricia Bosworth in her review for the same publication observed a month later: "How was she able to live with so much duplicity? Ms. Bloom is never able to explain ... why she didn't kick him out or just leave herself... [It] is not a vindictive book: Ms. Bloom bends over backward to be fair to Mr. Roth, perhaps too fair." Alternatively, historian and Roth biographer Steven Zipperstein has characterized the memoir as a "bleak, acidic portrayal of their marriage . . . with most reviewers taking its accuracy for granted," although she herself would later admit to her inability to care for Roth when he suffered from "severe mental anguish so overwhelming that he admitted himself as a psychiatric patient to Silver Hill Hospital." Zoë Heller, in an article for the London Review of Books thought Bloom's life acts as a "lighthouse to stage-struck girls" warning them away from an acting career and a "cautionary tale about the dangers of economic dependence".

== Quotations ==
- "The life of an actor is peppered with blows to the ego"
- "Which was the real Philip Roth? The chasm between his words and deeds was immense"
- "My own disposition points more towards the attitude of Victor Mature, who, decades ago, speaking seriously about his craft, declared, 'I wouldn't walk up a wet step.'"
- "London is different from anywhere else: London is where I belong. I love this city, above all others, and could find my way around it in my sleep."
