= The Facts =

The Facts may refer to:

- The Facts: A Novelist's Autobiography, a novel by Philip Roth
- The Facts (Seattle), a weekly African-American newspaper based in Seattle, Washington's Central District, founded in 1961
- Brazosport Facts, a newspaper based in Clute, Texas
- The Facts, the 114th segment on the Strong Bad Email Series of Homestar Runner.
