= The Humbling =

2009 novel by Philip Roth

- Cover of the first edition.
- Author: Philip Roth
- Language: English
- Genre: Novel, Theatre-fiction
- Published: 2009
- Publisher: Houghton Mifflin Harcourt
- Publication place: United States
- Pages: 140
- ISBN: 978-0-547-23969-9
- OCLC: 317917962
- Preceded by: Indignation
- Followed by: Nemesis

The Humbling is a novel by Philip Roth published in the fall of 2009 by Houghton Mifflin Harcourt. It is Roth's 30th book and concerns "an aging stage actor whose empty life is altered by a 'counterplot of unusual erotic desire'."

== Plot ==
=== Part one ===
Simon Axler is a famed sexagenarian stage actor who suddenly and inexplicably loses his gift. His weak attempts at portraying Prospero and Macbeth on stage at the Kennedy Center in Washington, D.C., lead to poor reviews, sending Axler into a profound depression and causing him to give up acting and contemplate suicide with a shotgun he keeps in his attic. His wife, Victoria, a former ballerina, is unable to deal with Axler's depression and moves to California, where their son lives. Axler checks himself into a psychiatric hospital on the advice of his physician and stays there for 26 days.

In the hospital, Axler meets another patient, Sybil Van Buren, who tells him about catching her second husband sexually abusing her young daughter. She expresses shame at not immediately reporting her husband or removing him from the home and admits to attempting suicide. Sybil asks Axler whether he would be willing to kill her husband and he tells her he fears he would "botch the job".

Months after his stint in the hospital, Axler's agent, Jerry Oppenheim, visits him at his upstate New York home to tell him about an offer to play James Tyrone in Long Day's Journey into Night. Axler refuses, fearing another failure. In the fan mail Oppenheim brings, Axler finds a letter from Sybil, thanking him for listening to her problems in the hospital. She says she did not recognize him at the time but decided to write him after catching one of his old movies on TV.

=== Part two ===
Pegeen Mike Stapleford, the 40-year-old daughter of two actors he performed with around the time she was born, pays Axler a visit at his house. Pegeen has just moved nearby to work as a professor at a Vermont women's college after ending a six-year relationship with a woman who decided to undergo sex reassignment surgery to become a man. Pegeen's job was secured after she slept with the school's "smitten" dean, Louise Renner.

Simon and Pegeen begin an affair despite Pegeen's having lived as a lesbian for the previous 17 years. Louise is furious that Pegeen has broken off their relationship and begins stalking her. Months later, Louise calls Pegeen's parents in Lansing, Michigan, to tell them that their daughter is now sleeping with Axler. Pegeen is distressed that her parents have learned about the relationship she wanted kept secret. Her father, Asa, tells her he disapproves because of the age difference but Simon suspects he merely envies his professional success. Asa directs community theater in Michigan.

=== Part three ===
Axler reads in the local newspaper that Sybil has shot and killed her estranged husband. He contacts Sybil's sister and offers to help with her murder defense.

One night, Pegeen "offers" Axler a 19-year-old college student of her acquaintance named Lara. Lara becomes a fantasy of his and a character in Pegeen's sexual role-playing.

Soon after, while Axler and Pegeen are dining out, he notices Tracy, a young woman getting drunk at the restaurant bar, and they take her home for a threesome. Afterward, Axler asks her why she agreed to go home with them, and she admits she recognized him as a famous actor. After this adventure, Axler feels rejuvenated and decides he wants to perform in Long Day's Journey after all. He also decides that he wants to father a child with Pegeen and visits a fertility specialist without telling her.

Two weeks later, Pegeen ends their relationship, telling Axler she "made a mistake." He accuses her of leaving him to be with Tracy and believes Pegeen's parents have turned her against him. He calls her parents, shouting at them in an angry tirade. After the call, Axler kills himself with his shotgun.

== Critical response ==
The reviews for The Humbling largely suggested that, after several books that had received high critical acclaim, Roth had taken a misstep, to be blamed in part on his extremely prolific output in recent years.

In a highly critical piece for The Guardian and The Observer, William Skidelsky resoundingly panned the novel and called for Roth to slow down, declaring:

Roth's new novel is, by his standards, dismayingly poor...it can hardly be called a novel at all; it is more an old man's sexual fantasy dressed up in the garb of literature. There are, of course, redeeming features: an interesting initial conceit, the usual beautifully controlled writing. And the novel asks interesting questions about ageing and what it does to you. But these things aren't nearly enough to make up for the absurdity at its core.

Skidelsky concluded by remarking, "On reading such a piece of scandalous frippery, it is hard not to conclude that Roth, rather than forging furiously ahead, should indeed be slowing down a little. And perhaps he should be getting out of the house a bit more."

In Literary Review, Sam Leith wrote: "The Humbling is just as its title suggests. Not the tragedy its protagonist might have hoped for – rather, a work of plaintive comedy."

Further negative notices came from Michiko Kakutani in the New York Times, which criticized the novel as "an overstuffed short story... a slight, disposable work". Kakutani added that Roth seemed to be "...simply going through the motions of ticking off plot points on a spindly, ill-conceived outline."

Mixed but slightly more positive notices were also forthcoming. The Daily Telegraph, which despite also declaring the novel to be "slight", went on to praise The Humbling as a "grave—and important—novel... a fine, unsettling piece of writing that deserves its place in Roth’s canon... His new work will not detain you long, but it will linger." 2008 Booker Prize winner Aravind Adiga in his review for The Times declared the novel to be "...the most entertaining depressing book you’ll read this year", comparing it to Roth's own highly praised Sabbath's Theater and The Human Stain, but went on to add caveats. Adiga, despite calling the novel "an original and unsettling book", also considered the novel "a failure", adding, "the language is vibrant, the sex is smutty, there are some lovely surprises in the narrative — yet, like Everyman, it lacks the wider social engagement that made American Pastoral or I Married a Communist so memorable. Like Everyman, it is a voluptuous essay on extinction masquerading as a novel."

One of the most positive reviews of the novel came from Jesse Kornbluth who declared it "Roth's best work in years; sentence for sentence, paragraph for paragraph, he's still the most readable serious writer we've got." Kornbluth went on to praise numerous aspects of the novel summing up with what amounted to an open tribute to Roth and his writing: "This is a long way from the summer romance of Goodbye, Columbus. But Philip Roth was 26 when he published that. He's 76 now. He's outlived all of his rivals. He's our most prominent novelist. And over 30 books, he's learned how to disturb us — and keep us reading. The Humbling is haunting proof."

== Film adaptation ==
In December 2009, actor Al Pacino purchased the rights to the novel for the purposes of creating a film adaptation. The film, directed by Barry Levinson, was released in the USA on January 23, 2015.
