= The Anatomy Lesson (Roth novel) =

1983 novel by Philip Roth

- First edition cover
- Author: Philip Roth
- Language: English
- Series: Zuckerman Trilogy
- Published: 1983 Farrar, Straus and Giroux
- Publication place: United States
- Media type: Print (hardback & paperback)
- Pages: 291
- ISBN: 9780374104924
- OCLC: 9643529
- Preceded by: Zuckerman Unbound
- Followed by: The Prague Orgy

The Anatomy Lesson is a 1983 novel by American author Philip Roth. It is the third novel from Roth to feature Nathan Zuckerman as the main character.

== Summary ==
Having buried his father in the previous novel Zuckerman Unbound, Zuckerman finds himself facing middle age and an undiagnosable pain. The mysterious ailment has him laid up and keeps him from his regime of writing. Barred by pain from writing and bored by inactivity, Zuckerman's mind is free to wander anxiously over the memories of his failed marriages and relationships with family members. In a desperate burst of nostalgia and ambition, Zuckerman resolves to return to the University of Chicago, his alma mater, in order to pursue medical school.

== Critical reception ==
The Anatomy Lesson was a finalist for the National Book Critics Circle Award for Fiction and the National Book Award. In The Observer in 1984, Martin Amis wrote, "The Anatomy Lesson may be the third and final installment of the Zuckerman trilogy, but it is also Roth's second consecutive novel about what success is like. Such fixity!... He has now written two autobiographical novels about the consequences of writing autobiographical novels," adding, "no modern writer, perhaps no writer, has taken self-examination so far and so literally." In The New Yorker, John Updike was more complimentary finding, "The postmodernist writer's bind is expressed in flat authoritative accents reminiscent of Hemingway...Throughout, a beautiful passion to be honest propels the grinding, whining paragraphs. Yet, though lavish with laughs and flamboyant invention, The Anatomy Lesson seemed to this Roth fan the least successful of the Zuckerman trio, the least objectified and coherent."

== Zuckerman Bound ==
The first and second books in the Zuckerman trilogy are 1979's The Ghost Writer and 1981's Zuckerman Unbound. The three were collected and republished in 1985 as Zuckerman Bound. Republication moved some critics to reassess this third entry; again in The New Yorker, John Updike wrote, "In toto, Zuckerman Bound shows the author's always ebullient invention and artful prose at their most polished and concentrated, the topic of authorship clearly being, to this author, a noble one." In The New York Times Book Review, critic Harold Bloom said of the three collected Zuckerman novels, "Zuckerman Bound merits something reasonably close to the highest level of esthetic praise for tragicomedy."
