= Patrimony: A True Story =

1991 memoir by American writer Philip Roth

Patrimony
- First edition
- Author: Philip Roth
- Language: English
- Subject: death and dying, father/son relationships
- Genre: memoir
- Publisher: Simon & Schuster
- Publication date: 1991
- Media type: Print (Hardcover)
- Pages: 238
- ISBN: 0-671-70375-7
- OCLC: 21448290
- Dewey Decimal: 813/.54 B 20
- LC Class: PS3568.O855 Z468 1991

Patrimony: A True Story is a memoir by American writer Philip Roth. It was first published by Simon & Schuster in 1991.

== Summary ==
Roth's memoir recounts the life, decline, and death of his father, Herman Roth, from an inoperable (and originally "benign") brain tumor.

== Composition ==
"In keeping with the unseemliness of my profession," as Roth puts it in a late chapter, the author wrote his memoir during his father's medical trials. The tone, he later explained, was not meant to be one of anger. "It was more anxiety and bewilderment. This was all new to me, all new to him, and I felt powerless to find a way to help him. We went through this experience together."

== Awards ==
Patrimony received the 1992 National Book Critics Circle Award for autobiography. It was his second Book Critics Circle Award, after a 1987 fiction prize for The Counterlife.

== Reception ==
The book was enthusiastically received. Entertainment Weekly's critic L.S. Klepp gave the memoir an "A": "Blunt and devout, comfortless and bracing, Patrimony is a triumph of unflinching memory." Robert M. Adams, in The New York Review of Books called Roth's work "a major achievement." R.Z. Sheppard, in Time, viewed the book's concerns as ethnic: "There is a great distance between Portnoy's Complaint, with its stage-Jewish parents, and Patrimony, the perfect eulogy for a stiff-necked elder of the tribe. Yet in celebrating his father, and by implication the source of his own character, Roth has not strayed from the long path he has cut for himself: to dramatize the adventure of assimilation in all its anxiety, humor and fertile illusions. As a writer and a son, he has now dotted the i's and crossed the t's." In The New York Times Book Review, critic and future U.S. Poet Laureate Robert Pinsky wrote, "In a cunningly straightforward way, Patrimony tells one of the central true stories many Americans share nowadays: the agonized, sometimes comic labor of a family and a dying parent who must deal with all the loyalties and grudges of their past while coping with their transformed future as dictated by the invasive, also benign pressures of modern medicine and its technologies, bureaucratically organized. The struggle that Mr. Roth portrays in often ebullient detail could be summarized abstractly as the effort to keep death as it once was — a phenomenon of one particular human body and soul...It is a spirit that corresponds to the gloriously pragmatic, unpredictable genius of Philip Roth's narrative gifts."

== Cover ==
The cover photograph shows two generations of Roths: the author's father, older brother Sandy, and the writer himself, as a boy.

== Library of America ==
This memoir is included in the fifth volume of Philip Roth's collected works Novels and Other Narratives 1986–1991, published by the Library of America.
