= The Human Stain (film) =

2003 American film by Robert Benton

- Theatrical release poster
- Directed by: Robert Benton
- Screenplay by: Nicholas Meyer
- Based on: The Human Stain by Philip Roth
- Produced by: Tom Rosenberg; Gary Lucchesi; Scott Steindorff; Bob Weinstein; Harvey Weinstein
- Starring: Anthony Hopkins; Nicole Kidman; Ed Harris; Gary Sinise
- Cinematography: Jean-Yves Escoffier
- Edited by: Christopher Tellefsen
- Music by: Rachel Portman
- Production companies: Lakeshore Entertainment; Cinerenta; Stone Village Pictures
- Distributed by: Miramax Films (Worldwide); Concorde Filmverleih (Germany)
- Release dates: August 29, 2003 (Venice); October 29, 2003 (France); October 31, 2003 (United States); December 18, 2003 (Germany)
- Running time: 106 minutes
- Countries: United States; Germany
- Language: English
- Budget: $30 million
- Box office: $24.9 million

The Human Stain is a 2003 American drama film directed by Robert Benton. Its screenplay, by Nicholas Meyer, is based on the 2000 novel by Philip Roth. The film stars Anthony Hopkins, Nicole Kidman, Gary Sinise, and Ed Harris.

== Plot ==
In the late 1990s, writer Nathan Zuckerman has settled in a lakeside New England cabin following his second divorce and a battle with prostate cancer. His quiet life is interrupted by Coleman Silk, a former dean and professor of classics at local Athena College, who was forced to resign after being accused of making a racist remark in class. Coleman's wife died suddenly following the scandal, and he wants to avenge his loss of career and companion by writing a book about the events with Nathan's assistance.

The project is placed on the back burner when Coleman has an affair with a younger woman, named Faunia Farley, a semi-literate who supports herself by working menial jobs, including at the college. Their relationship is threatened by the faculty members who forced Coleman from his job and by Faunia's ex-husband, Lester, a mentally unbalanced Vietnam War veteran, who blames her for the deaths of their children in an accident. Flashbacks of Coleman's life reveal his secret: he is an African American, who has "passed" as a Jewish man for most of his adult life.

== Cast ==
- Anthony Hopkins as Coleman Silk
  - Wentworth Miller as young Coleman Silk
- Nicole Kidman as Faunia Farley
- Gary Sinise as Nathan Zuckerman
- Ed Harris as Lester Farley
- Jacinda Barrett as Steena Paulsson
- Mimi Kuzyk as Delphine Roux
- Clark Gregg as Nelson Primus
- John Finn as Louie Borero
- Anna Deavere Smith as Dorothy Silk
- Phyllis Newman as Iris Silk
  - Mili Avital as young Iris Silk
- Harry Lennix as Clarence Silk
- Tom Rack as Bob Cat
- Lizan Mitchell as Ernestine Silk
- Danny Blanco-Hall as Walter Silk
- Kerry Washington as Ellie
- Margo Martindale as Psychologist

== Release ==
The film debuted at the Venice Film Festival. It was shown at the Toronto International Film Festival, the Bergen International Film Festival, and the Hollywood Film Festival before its theatrical release in the US.

=== Box office ===
The film grossed $5,381,908 in the United States and Canada, and $19,481,896 internationally for a total worldwide box office of $24,863,304 against a budget of $30 million.

=== Critical response ===
On review aggregator Rotten Tomatoes 42% of 154 reviews were positive, with an average rating of 5.5/10. The site's consensus reads, "Though the acting is fine, the leads are miscast, and the story is less powerful on screen than on the page." On Metacritic it has a score of 57% based on reviews from 39 critics, indicating "mixed or average reviews".

In his review in The New York Times, A. O. Scott called it "an honorable B+ term paper of a movie: sober, scrupulous and earnestly respectful of its literary source ... The filmmakers explicate Mr. Roth's themes with admirable clarity and care and observe his characters with delicate fondness, but they cannot hope to approximate the brilliance and rapacity of his voice, which holds all the novel's disparate elements together. Without the active intervention of Mr. Roth's intelligence ... the story fails to cohere ... At its best—which also tends to be at its quietest—The Human Stain allows you both to care about its characters and to think about the larger issues that their lives represent. Its deepest flaw is an inability to link those moments of empathy and insight into a continuous drama, to suggest that the characters' lives keep going when they are not on screen."

Roger Ebert of the Chicago Sun-Times observed, "We have to suspend disbelief over the casting, but that's easier since we can believe the stories of these people. Not many movies probe into matters of identity or adaptation. Most movie characters are like Greek gods and comic book heroes: We learn their roles and powers at the beginning of the story, and they never change. Here are complex, troubled, flawed people, brave enough to breathe deeply and take one more risk with their lives."

In the San Francisco Chronicle, Mick LaSalle called it "a mediocre movie ... [that] falls victim to a fatal lack of narrative drive, suspense and drama. Kidman and Hopkins are wrong for their roles, and that, combined with a pervading inevitability, cuts the film off from any sustained vitality. The result is something admirable but lifeless."

David Stratton of Variety described it as "an intelligent adaptation of Philip Roth's arguably unfilmable novel powered by two eye-catching performances ... A key problem Benton is unable to avoid is that Hopkins and Miller don't look (or talk) the least bit like one another. Miller, who gives a strong, muted performance, convinces as a light-skinned African-American in a way Hopkins never does, which is not to suggest that the Welsh-born actor doesn't give another intelligent, powerful portrayal. It's just that the believability gap looms large."

In Rolling Stone, Peter Travers said, "Hopkins and Kidman ... are both as mesmerizing as they are miscast ... The Human Stain is heavy going. It's the flashes of dramatic lightning that make it a trip worth taking."

The Times of London called it "sapping and unbelievable melodrama ... an unforgivably turgid lecture about political correctness."

== Accolades ==
- American Film Institute Award for Best Movies of 2003 (winner)
- Washington D.C. Area Film Critics Association Award for Best Supporting Actress (Anna Deavere Smith, winner)
- Black Reel Award for Best Supporting Actress in a Motion Picture (Smith, winner)
- Black Reel Award for Best Actor in a Motion Picture (Wentworth Miller, nominee)
- Black Reel Award for Best Breakthrough Performance (Miller, nominee)

== Music ==
The soundtrack to The Human Stain was released September 23, 2003.

No.	Title	Artist	Length
1.	"Opening Credits"	Rachel Portman	3:11
2.	"Iris Dies/Library Coleman Waits for Faunia"	Rachel Portman	2:29
3.	"It's in the Mail/End Credits"	Rachel Portman	7:03
4.	"The Two Urns/Father Dies"	Rachel Portman	2:31
5.	"Navy Recruiting"	Rachel Portman	1:01
6.	"Steena Rejects Coleman"	Rachel Portman	1:28
7.	"Audobon Society/The Crow"	Rachel Portman	2:35
8.	"Coleman's Funeral/Faunia Dances"	Rachel Portman	1:14
9.	"The Accident"	Rachel Portman	2:46
10.	"You Think Like a Prisoner"	Rachel Portman	2:05
11.	"Frozen Lake"	Rachel Portman	1:36
12.	"It's in the Mail/End Credits (Rewrite)"	Rachel Portman	7:03
Total length:			35:02

== See also ==
- Whitewashing in film
