= The Humbling (film) =

2014 film by Barry Levinson

- Theatrical release poster
- Directed by: Barry Levinson
- Written by: Buck Henry; Michal Zebede
- Based on: The Humbling by Philip Roth
- Produced by: Al Pacino; Barry Levinson; Jason Sosnoff; Monika Bacardi; Ged Dickersin; Kristina Dubin; Andrea Iervolino; Gisella Marengo
- Starring: Al Pacino; Greta Gerwig; Nina Arianda; Dylan Baker; Charles Grodin; Dan Hedaya; Billy Porter; Kyra Sedgwick; Dianne Wiest; Mary Louise Wilson
- Cinematography: Adam Jandrup
- Edited by: Aaron Yanes
- Music by: Marcelo Zarvos
- Production companies: Ambi Pictures; Hammerton Productions; Millennium Films
- Distributed by: Millennium Entertainment
- Release dates: August 30, 2014 (VIFF); January 23, 2015 (United States)
- Running time: 107 minutes
- Country: United States
- Language: English
- Budget: $2 million
- Box office: $400,000

The Humbling is a 2014 American comedy-drama film directed by Barry Levinson and written by Buck Henry and Michal Zebede, based on the 2009 novel by Philip Roth. The film stars Al Pacino, Greta Gerwig, Dianne Wiest, Nina Arianda, Dylan Baker, Charles Grodin, Dan Hedaya, Billy Porter, Kyra Sedgwick and Mary Louise Wilson.

It was screened in the "Special Presentations" section of the 2014 Toronto International Film Festival and in the "Out of Competition" section of the 71st Venice International Film Festival. The film was released on January 23, 2015 by Millennium Films.

== Plot ==
Simon Axler is an aging actor who has bouts of dementia. He is institutionalized after an incident during a Broadway play, then returns home, where he contemplates suicide Ernest Hemingway style. When he embarks on an affair with old friends Asa and Carol Staplefords' bisexual daughter Pegeen, his world begins to fall apart. It ends on stage, with Axler's audience and fellow actors unsure of what is real and what is not.

== Cast ==
- Al Pacino as Simon Axler
- Greta Gerwig as Pegeen Mike Stapleford
- Kyra Sedgwick as Louise Trenner
- Dan Hedaya as Asa Stapleford
- Dianne Wiest as Carol Stapleford
- Charles Grodin as Jerry Oppenheim
- Dylan Baker as Dr. Farr
- Nina Arianda as Sybil Van Buren
- Billy Porter as Prince
- Mary Louise Wilson as Mrs. Rutledge
- Li Jun Li as Tracy
- Peter Francis James as Kent
- Ricky Paull Goldin as Director
- Maria-Christina Oliveras as Dr. Wan

== Production ==
After reading and connecting with the Philip Roth book, Al Pacino decided to option the book and asked Barry Levinson to direct it. Levinson decided to make the movie as a dark comedy, noting, "If you want to talk about an older actor in decline, just to do it as some straight drama didn’t seem that intriguing to me", also citing that comedy "seemed to me inherent in the piece". Although both Pacino and Levinson have denied that the character of Simon Axler is autobiographical to Pacino's life, Pacino noted that he related to the material, stating, "It's in, as they say, my wheelhouse".

Although the film had ample funding in the beginning, the listed conditions became too much for Levinson, who rejected them and lost, by his estimate, "somewhere in the area of $6 million". Subsequently, it was decided to shoot the film incrementally, with several breaks to accommodate Pacino's schedule. This was a new experience for Levinson, although he welcomed the change of pace, as "it added to the clarity".

On February 4, 2014, it was announced that Millennium Films had acquired the worldwide rights to the film.

== Reception ==
The Humbling received mixed reviews from critics. On Rotten Tomatoes, the film has a rating of 53%, based on 62 reviews, with a rating of 5.4/10. The site's critical consensus reads: "The Humbling is an inarguable highlight of Al Pacino's late-period filmography, but that's an admittedly low bar that it doesn't always clear by a very wide margin." On Metacritic, the film has a score of 59 out of 100, based on 25 critics, indicating "mixed or average" reviews.
