= Zuckerman Bound =

Trilogy of novels by Philip Roth, originally published 1979–1985

- First edition cover
- Author: Philip Roth
- Language: English
- Series: Zuckerman Bound
- Genre: Novel
- Publisher: Farrar, Straus & Giroux
- Publication date: 1985
- Publication place: United States
- Media type: Print (hardback & paperback)

Zuckerman Bound is a trilogy of novels by Philip Roth, originally published in 1985.

== Plot ==
Each of the books follows the struggles and writing career of Roth's novelist alter ego Nathan Zuckerman.

== Contents ==
The bound trilogy consists of:

- The Ghost Writer (1979)
- Zuckerman Unbound (1981)
- The Anatomy Lesson (1983)

And an epilogue:

- The Prague Orgy (1985)

== Reception ==
Zuckerman Bound met with great acclaim upon publication. In The New York Times Book Review critic Harold Bloom wrote, "'Zuckerman Bound' merits something reasonably close to the highest level of esthetic praise for tragicomedy, partly because as a formal totality it becomes much more than the sum of its parts."

After Roth's passing, The New York Times asked several prominent authors to name their favorite work by Roth. Adrian Tomine selected Zuckerman Bound, writing: "By design, these linked stories have the ring of autobiographical truth, like an unsparing series of dispatches from the front lines of, well, being a wildly talented, successful and complicated writer from New Jersey at the end of the twentieth century. I actually have no idea how closely the narratives correlate with the author’s real life, but these, more than any other of Roth’s books, strike me as someone perfectly articulating the one thing he is an absolute authority on: How the world looks, feels and sounds to him. They’re the stories that first come to mind when I think of Philip Roth, and they’re the ones that I’ve returned to the most."

== Different editions ==
The Library of America edition, Zuckerman Bound: A Trilogy & Epilogue 1979–1985, also includes a previously unpublished television screenplay for The Prague Orgy.
