= Deception (novel) =

1990 novel by Philip Roth

- First edition cover
- Author: Philip Roth
- Language: English
- Genre: Fiction
- Publisher: Simon & Schuster
- Publication date: 1990
- Publication place: United States
- Pages: 208
- ISBN: 0-671-70374-9
- OCLC: 20756419

Deception is a 1990 novel by Philip Roth. It is a spin-off of Roth’s 1986 novel The Counterlife.

== Style ==
The book is written almost entirety in dialogue and is presented as the research notes for Roth’s earlier novel The Counterlife. The novel marks the first time Roth uses his own name as the name of the protagonist within a fictional work; he had previously used himself as a main character in a work of non-fiction - The Facts: A Novelist's Autobiography, and would do so again in the memoir Patrimony. "Roth" would also be narrator of the novels Operation Shylock and The Plot Against America.

== Summary ==
The book revolves around a series of intimate conversations recorded by a married Jewish-American writer named Philip, living in London, and an upper-middle-class Englishwoman trapped in a loveless marriage. Philip’s wife discovers the notebook of conversations and accuses him of infidelity, which he denies. In the final chapter, Philip and his mistress reconnect and discuss Philip Roth’s novel The Counterlife, which he admits is based largely on their relationship.

== Reception ==
Writing in The New York Times Book Review, the writer and critic Fay Weldon called the novel "extraordinary, elegant, disturbing," adding that she had found it, "exhilarating." She continues:

"Mr. Roth throws down a gauntlet. He is very brave; this literary navel-gazing is a risky occupation. Is this novel a portrait of Mr. Roth or non-Roth in hateful literary London, having it off with the wives of his friends? What conceit, to think we're interested. Yet he gets away with it even as he angers us. How skillful this lover, he who started out as the grubby, impetuous Portnoy, has become. How delicately within this 'text without exposition et cetera' he delineates lines of plot, character, event, desire. How he seduces the reluctant, soothes the aggravated."

== Library of America ==
Deception is included in the fifth volume of Roth's collected works, Novels and Other Narratives 1986–1991, published by the Library of America in 2008.

== Film adaptation ==
The novel was adapted in the 2021 film of the same name, starring Denis Podalydès, Léa Seydoux and Anouk Grinberg.
