= Deception (2021 film) =

- Theatrical release poster
- French: Tromperie
- Directed by: Arnaud Desplechin
- Screenplay by: Arnaud Desplechin; Julie Peyr
- Based on: Deception by Philip Roth
- Produced by: Pascal Caucheteux
- Starring: Denis Podalydès; Léa Seydoux; Anouk Grinberg; Emmanuelle Devos; Rebecca Marder; Madalina Constantin
- Cinematography: Yorick Le Saux
- Edited by: Laurence Briaud
- Music by: Grégoire Hetzel
- Production companies: Why Not Productions; Canal+; Cine+
- Distributed by: Le Pacte
- Release dates: 13 July 2021 (Cannes); 8 December 2021 (France)
- Running time: 105 minutes
- Country: France
- Language: French

Deception (French: Tromperie) is a 2021 French drama film, directed by Arnaud Desplechin, from a screenplay by Desplechin and Julie Peyr. It is based upon the novel of the same name by Philip Roth. It stars Denis Podalydès, Léa Seydoux, Anouk Grinberg, Emmanuelle Devos, Rebecca Marder and Madalina Constantin.

It had its world premiere at the Cannes Film Festival on 13 July 2021. It was released on 8 December 2021, by Le Pacte.

== Cast ==
- Denis Podalydès as Philip
- Léa Seydoux as The English Lover
- Anouk Grinberg as Wife
- Emmanuelle Devos as Rosalie
- Rebecca Marder as The Student
- Madalina Constantin as The Tech

== Production ==
In March 2016, Arnaud Desplechin expressed desire to adapt Deception by Philip Roth, stating: "Perhaps it’s a book that I will never be able to adapt for the screen, and I know I will regret it for the rest of my days." In December 2020, it was announced Léa Seydoux, Denis Podalydès, Emmanuelle Devos and Gennadi Famin had joined the cast of the film, with Desplechin directing from a screenplay he wrote alongside Julie Peyr.

Principal photography began in September 2020.

== Release ==
It had its world premiere at the Cannes Film Festival on 13 July 2021. It released in France on 8 December 2021.

== Reception ==
On AlloCiné, a French film website, Deception has an average rating of 3.6 out of 5 stars based on 26 critics. On English review aggregator Rotten Tomatoes, 53% of 19 critics gave the film a positive review, with an average rating of 5.1/10. Metacritic gave the film a weighted average score of 42 out of 100, based on 10 critics, indicating "mixed or average reviews".
