= The Counterlife =

1986 novel by Philip Roth

- First edition cover
- Author: Philip Roth
- Publisher: Farrar, Straus and Giroux
- Publication date: 1986
- Pages: 324 pp
- ISBN: 978-0-374-13026-8
- OCLC: 13904280
- Dewey Decimal: 813/.54
- LC Class: PS3568.O855 C6 1986

The Counterlife (1986) is a novel by the American author Philip Roth. It is the fourth full-length novel to feature the fictional novelist Nathan Zuckerman. When The Counterlife was published, Zuckerman had most recently appeared in a novella called The Prague Orgy, the epilogue to the omnibus volume Zuckerman Bound.

== Plot summary ==
The novel is divided into five parts, each of which presents a variation on the same basic situation. Parts I and IV are independent of any other part in the novel, whereas Parts II, III, and V form a more or less continuous narrative.

Part I, "Basel," opens with what appears to be an excerpt from the diary of Jewish novelist Nathan Zuckerman. Nathan talks about his brother, Henry Zuckerman, a suburban dentist who had been having an affair with his assistant Wendy. Henry, however, has developed a serious heart condition, and the medicine has made him impotent. The only alternative to the medication is a potentially life-threatening operation. Henry, unwilling to surrender the possibility of sex, turns to his estranged brother for advice. Nathan tries to dissuade Henry from doing the operation, and tells him that he will eventually adjust, but Henry only becomes increasingly desperate with time.

At this point the narration shifts into the third person, revealing that this "diary entry" was in actuality the eulogy that Nathan had planned to give at Henry's funeral: the operation had killed him. Nathan decides not to give the eulogy, however, concluding that it would merely embarrass his brother's family. At the funeral, Henry's wife Carol delivers the eulogy instead, in which she attributes the operation to Henry's love for her. Nathan is skeptical of her sincerity and wonders how much she knew of her husband's multiple affairs. He also pities his brother, whom he characterizes as a man so desperate to escape his middle-class existence that he preferred death to its stifling stability.

Part II, "Judea," resets the narrative of the novel thus far: in this section, Henry has survived the operation to fix his heart condition and restore sexual function. Yet rather than resume his previous life, Henry has chosen to abscond to Israel and live in a West Bank settlement. Nathan is sent to Israel by Carol to persuade Henry to return to his family. In Israel, Nathan meets with a variety of Jews who share their diverse perspectives with him, including a crazed fan named Jimmy who accosts him at the Wailing Wall. Nathan then confronts Henry at his settlement, where Henry and the settlers castigate him for betraying his fellow Jews. Nathan meets the settlement's charismatic leader, who delivers a rabid soliloquy about the importance of settling Judea and Samaria. Nathan later confronts Henry and suggests that the settlement leader reminds him of their father, and this might account for part of his influence on Henry. Henry responds angrily that what really matters is not whether or not the leader is a father-figure, but who controls Judea. Unable to talk sense into Henry, Nathan is forced to return home without his brother.

Part III, "Aloft," continues the "counterlife" begun in Part II. Nathan is flying back to the United States when he again encounters Jimmy. Jimmy reveals that he has smuggled a gun and a grenade onto the plane. He intends to send a message about Jews no longer being beholden to their traumatic history, and asks Nathan to assist him. Shortly thereafter, security officials attack and arrest Jimmy and Nathan, whom they accuse of colluding with him. Nathan feels humiliated both by the interrogation and by the fact that the security officials have seemingly never heard of him.

Part IV, "Gloucestershire," represents the third discrete 'counterlife' in the novel. In this section, Nathan is the impotent brother with a heart condition, and he and Henry have remained estranged. Nathan initially cooperates well with the medication, but he soon finds himself tempted by Maria, an English expatriate who lives upstairs with her daughter and diplomat husband. They begin to have an affair and Nathan considers having the operation. Maria urges him not to take such an enormous risk for her, but Nathan decides to do it anyway. He explains that it would allow him to fulfill his greatest desire—to settle down as a family man, by marrying Maria, adopting her daughter, and moving to the United Kingdom. Unfortunately, the operation fails and Nathan dies.

The section then shifts focus to Henry Zuckerman. Despite his misgivings, Henry takes the day off work and attends Nathan's funeral. He is deeply offended by the eulogy, in which an editor praises Nathan's controversial novel Carnovsky. Henry has previously accused the novel of humiliating the entire Zuckerman family: indeed, its publication was the cause of their estrangement. After leaving the funeral, Henry decides to inspect Nathan's apartment for anything that could embarrass him. He bribes his way in and quickly finds diary records that reveal a decade-old affair. Henry destroys the diary records, but he soon discovers the second draft of Nathan's last novel. This draft apparently contains Parts I, II, III, and V of the novel and Henry reacts to it with anger. Henry feels that Nathan has projected his insecurities onto him to alleviate his self-loathing. He thereafter destroys Parts I, II, and III, leaving behind Part V only because it does not mention him at length.

Part IV concludes by focusing on Maria herself. Maria is apparently discussing the recent death of Nathan with her therapist. She relates how she searched Nathan's apartment after his death and found the draft of his unfinished novel (which, due to Henry's intervention, now contains only Part V). She objects that Nathan exaggerated her family in it, inventing character flaws to make them more interesting and serve his own purposes. Maria also confesses that Nathan's portrait of her isn't like her at all, but is instead what Nathan must have wanted her or thought her to be. Nonetheless, she has decided to let the draft be published because she views it as a final expression of Nathan's love for her. As Part IV concludes, it is gradually revealed that Maria's interviewer is not a therapist; he is in fact a ghostly projection of Nathan himself. Maria bids good-bye to Nathan one last time.

Part V, "Christendom," returns to the narrative of Parts II and III. It delves into the married life of Nathan and Maria, which was briefly alluded to in the novel's previous sections. Just as Nathan wanted in Part IV, they have moved back to England and are temporarily staying with Maria's mother, a staid older woman who is "politely" anti-Semitic and subtly resents Nathan's relationship with her daughter. When Maria's sister confronts Nathan about marrying the younger and non-Jewish Maria, he begins to feel anxious about their marriage's future. These anxieties then break to the surface after the couple experience anti-Jewish prejudice at an English restaurant. Nathan afterward complains to Maria of her family and England's intolerance. Maria becomes irritable and accuses Nathan of being oversensitive. She leaves him to head back to their home.

The novel ends with Nathan and Maria breaking up, which Nathan depicts through an exchange of letters. Maria writes the first letter, explaining that she is walking out both on Nathan's marriage and Nathan's book. She objects to being yet another of his literary characters, complaining that the book's Maria is nothing like her real self—the real Maria, for example, would not express her feelings at such length in a letter. She also faults Nathan for giving their marriage an unhappy ending, pointing out that he had the ability to ensure that everything turned out well for them.

Nathan's response apologizes to Maria, but he also holds his ground. He explains to Maria that there is ultimately "no you" just as there is "no me." He claims they are merely the sum of the performances—the counterlives—that they invent for themselves and for others. Nathan reflects upon Jewish circumcision—which he would have forced upon his son—arguing that the pain of the ritual symbolizes the unfairness and cruelty the child will encounter in the world. Nathan ends the book by mourning the dissolution of his and Maria's relationship, because it is only in the pages of this novel he has written that they will ever have lived together in love.

== Style ==
The five sections of the novel each contradict each other to some extent, so certain events that have taken place in one section are presupposed not to have taken place in subsequent sections.

== Reception ==
Roth was awarded the 1987 National Book Critics Circle Award for fiction. He was also a finalist that year for the National Book Award.

Harold Bloom refers to it as an "astonishing book" in his 1991 interview with the Paris Review. In 2012 Martin Amis described it as a "masterpiece of postmodern fiction ... a really very impressively intricate book." James Wood of The Guardian has also called it "perhaps his greatest novel."

== Other editions ==
This book is included in the fifth volume of Philip Roth's collected works Novels and Other Narratives 1986–1991, published by the Library of America.
