= Claire Bloom =

English actress (born 1931)

Claire Bloom CBE
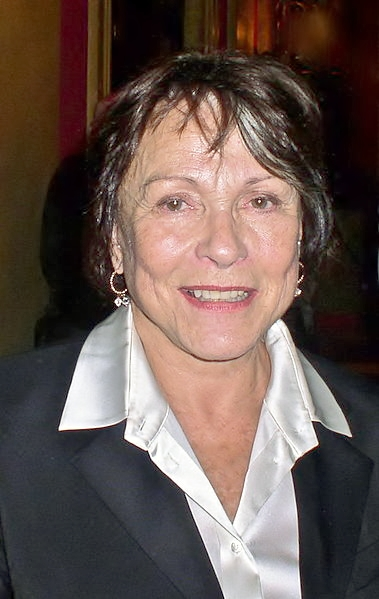
- Bloom in 2011
- Born: Patricia Claire Blume; 15 February 1931 (age 95); Finchley, Middlesex, England
- Education: Guildhall School of Music and Drama; Central School of Speech and Drama
- Occupation: Actress
- Years active: 1946–present
- Spouses: Rod Steiger (m. 1959; div. 1969); Hillard Elkins (m. 1969; div. 1972); Philip Roth (m. 1990; div. 1995)
- Children: Anna Steiger
- Relatives: John Bloom (brother)

Patricia Claire Bloom (born 15 February 1931) is an English actress. She is known for leading roles on stage and screen and has received two BAFTA Awards, an Emmy award and a Drama Desk Award, as well as nominations for a Grammy Award and a Tony Award. She was appointed Commander of the Order of the British Empire (CBE) in the 2013 Birthday Honours for services to drama.

After a childhood spent in England and Florida, Bloom studied drama in London. She debuted on the London stage when she was sixteen and took roles in various Shakespeare plays. They included Hamlet, in which she played Ophelia alongside Richard Burton. She rose to prominence playing leading roles in stage productions of A Streetcar Named Desire, A Doll's House, and Long Day's Journey into Night. She made her Broadway debut in the play Richard II (1956). She received a Tony Award for Best Featured Actress in a Play nomination for her role in Electra (1999).

Bloom made her film debut in The Blind Goddess (1948). Her breakthrough came with a leading role acting opposite Charlie Chaplin in Limelight (1952) for which she won the BAFTA Award for Most Promising Newcomer. She went on to act in films such as Richard III (1955), Alexander the Great (1956), The Brothers Karamazov (1958), The Haunting (1963), The Spy Who Came In from the Cold (1965), Charly (1968), A Doll's House (1973), Clash of the Titans (1981), and Shadowlands (1985). For the latter she won the BAFTA Award for Best Actress. She later acted in the Woody Allen films Crimes and Misdemeanors (1989) and Mighty Aphrodite (1995), and portrayed Queen Mary in historical drama The King's Speech (2010).

During her film career, she has starred alongside numerous major actors, including Richard Burton, Laurence Olivier, John Gielgud, Paul Scofield, Ralph Richardson, Yul Brynner, George C. Scott, James Mason, Paul Newman, Julie Harris, Anthony Hopkins, Rod Steiger and Jerry Lewis.

== Early life and education ==
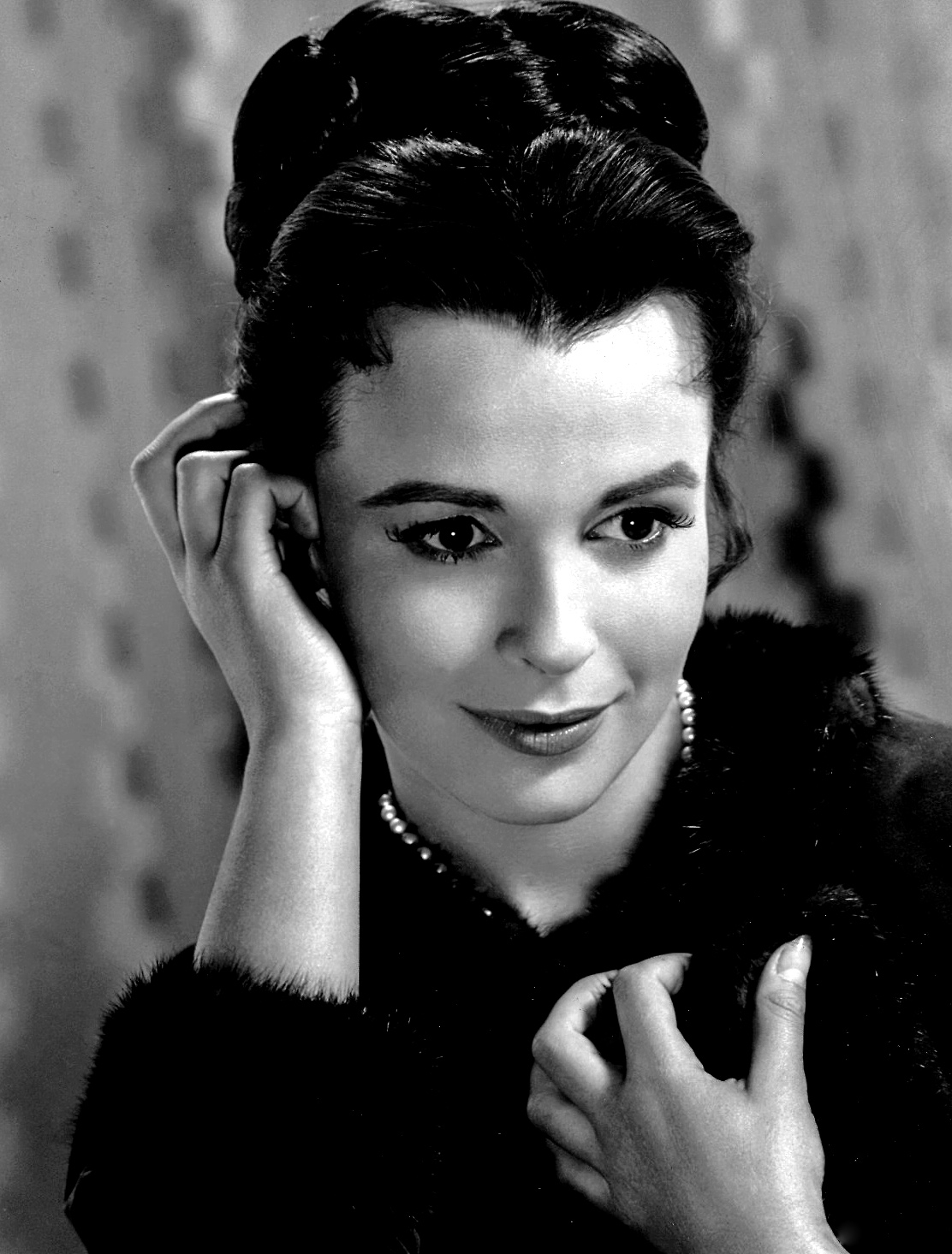
Bloom in The Brothers Karamazov (1958)

Bloom was born on 15 February 1931 as Patricia Claire Blume in Finchley, then part of Middlesex (now a suburb of north London), the daughter of Elizabeth (née Grew) and Edward Max Blume, a "not very successful" salesman. Her paternal grandparents, originally named Blumenthal, as well as her maternal grandparents, originally named Gravitzky, were Jewish emigrants from Byten in the Grodno region of Russia, now in Belarus, Eastern Europe.

Bloom's education was "somewhat haphazard"; she was sent to the independent Badminton School in Bristol, but when her father encountered financial difficulties the family relocated to Cornwall, where she attended the local village school. She later studied stage acting at the Guildhall School of Music and Drama, London, and continued her studies under Elsie Fogerty at the Central School of Speech and Drama, then based in the Royal Albert Hall, London.

After the Luftwaffe began bombing London during the Blitz in 1940 her family had a number of narrow escapes as bombs dropped close to their home. While their father remained in England, she and her brother John went with their mother to the United States, where she spent a year living in Florida with a paternal uncle's family; during this time her mother worked in her aunt's dress shop, "but she proved to be a dreadful saleswoman". She recalls, "It was 1941; I was ten, John was nearly six. We were to sail from Glasgow in a convoy, on a ship that was evacuating children." During her year's stay in Florida, she was asked by the British War Relief Society to help raise money by entertaining at various benefits, which she then did for a number of weeks. "Thus I broke into show business singing", she writes. Bloom, along with her mother and brother, next lived in New York with their mother's cousin for another eighteen months before returning to England. It was in New York that she decided to become an actress, after her mother took her to see the Broadway play Three Sisters for her twelfth birthday:

From then on I thought only of going into the theatre and playing in Chekhov. ... Chekhov was moving. That's what I was looking for—something more moving even than my own plight as a little English girl driven from my home by the Gods of War.

They returned to England in 1943, and due to her father's improved business lived in Mayfair, but her parents' marriage ended shortly afterwards – so her father could marry his girlfriend – and she had no contact with him for many years.

== Acting career ==
=== 1946–1969: Early roles and breakthrough ===
With John Neville in Romeo and Juliet (1957)

Bloom made her debut on BBC radio programmes. She made her stage debut in 1946 when she was 15 with the Oxford Repertory Theatre. Bloom debuted aged 16 at the Shakespeare Memorial Theatre as Ophelia to Paul Scofield's Hamlet; Robert Helpmann alternated playing the prince. Bloom has written that during the production she had a crush on Scofield. As Scofield was married and the father of a son, Bloom hoped only, "to be flirted with and taken some notice of". She later recalled, "I could never make up my mind which of my two Hamlets I found the more devastating: the openly homosexual, charismatic Helpmann, or the charming, shy young man from Sussex." When asked about Bloom years later, Scofield recalled, "Sixteen years old I think—so very young and necessarily inexperienced, she looked lovely, she acted with a daunting assurance which belied entirely her inexperience of almost timid reticence. She was a very good Ophelia."

Her London stage debut was in 1947 in the Christopher Fry play The Lady's Not For Burning, which starred Sir John Gielgud and Pamela Brown and featured a young Richard Burton. It also played on Broadway in New York City. It was during the rehearsals for the play that Burton and Bloom began a long love affair. The following year she received acclaim for her portrayal of Ophelia in Hamlet, starring Burton. Although Burton was at that time married to Sybil Christopher, fellow actor and friend of Burton, Stanley Baker, seeing how attracted he was to Bloom, commented that he "thought that this might be the time when Rich actually left Sybil." In his later years, Burton told his biographer, Michael Munn, "'I only ever loved two women before Elizabeth,' Sybil was one, Claire Bloom the other." Of her Juliet in Romeo and Juliet (1957), critic Kenneth Tynan stated it was the best he had ever seen. After she starred as Blanche DuBois in A Streetcar Named Desire, its playwright, Tennessee Williams, stated, "I declare myself absolutely wild about Claire Bloom".

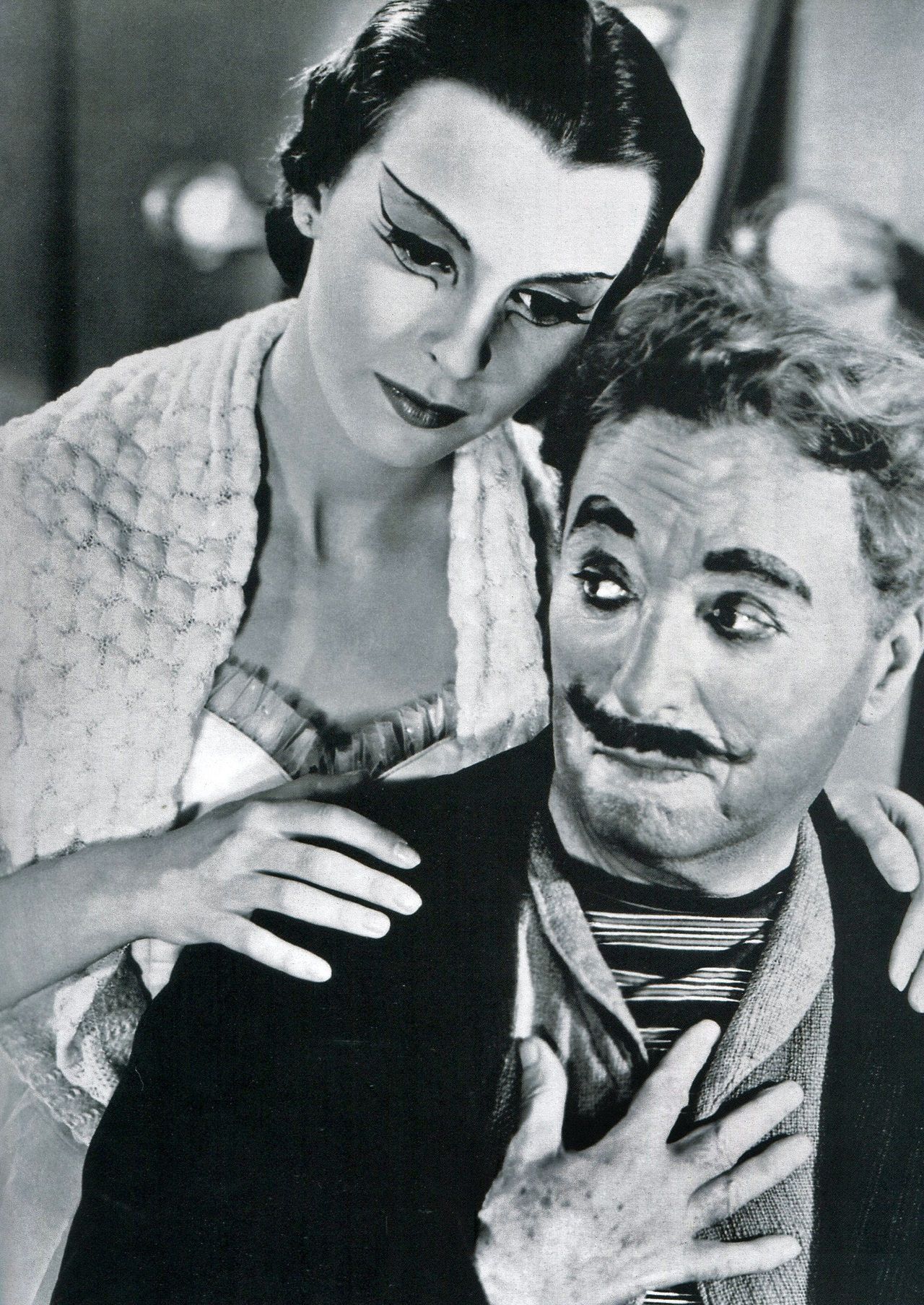
With Charlie Chaplin in Limelight (1952)

Bloom's first film role was in the 1948 film The Blind Goddess. She trained at the Rank Organisation's charm school but did not stay with that company for long. Her international screen debut came in the 1952 film Limelight, when she was chosen by Charlie Chaplin, who also directed, to co-star alongside him. The film catapulted Bloom to stardom. Biographer Dan Kamin states that Limelight is a similar story to Chaplin's City Lights, made twenty years earlier, in which Chaplin also helps a heroine overcome a physical handicap. In this film, Bloom plays a suicidal ballerina who "suffers from hysterical paralysis".

The film had personal meaning for Chaplin as it contained numerous references to his life and family: the theatre where he and Bloom performed in the film was the same theatre where his mother gave her last performance; Bloom was directed by Chaplin to wear dresses similar to those his mother used to wear; Chaplin's sons and his half-brother all had parts. Bloom states that she felt one of the reasons she got the part was because she closely resembled his young wife, Oona O'Neill. In his autobiography, Chaplin writes that he had no doubt the film would be a success: "I had fewer qualms about its success than any picture I had ever made." Chaplin explains his decision to make Bloom co-star despite this being her first film:

In casting the girl's part I wanted the impossible: beauty, talent, and a great emotional range. After months of searching and testing with disappointing results, I eventually had the good fortune to sign up Claire Bloom, who was recommended by my friend Arthur Laurents.

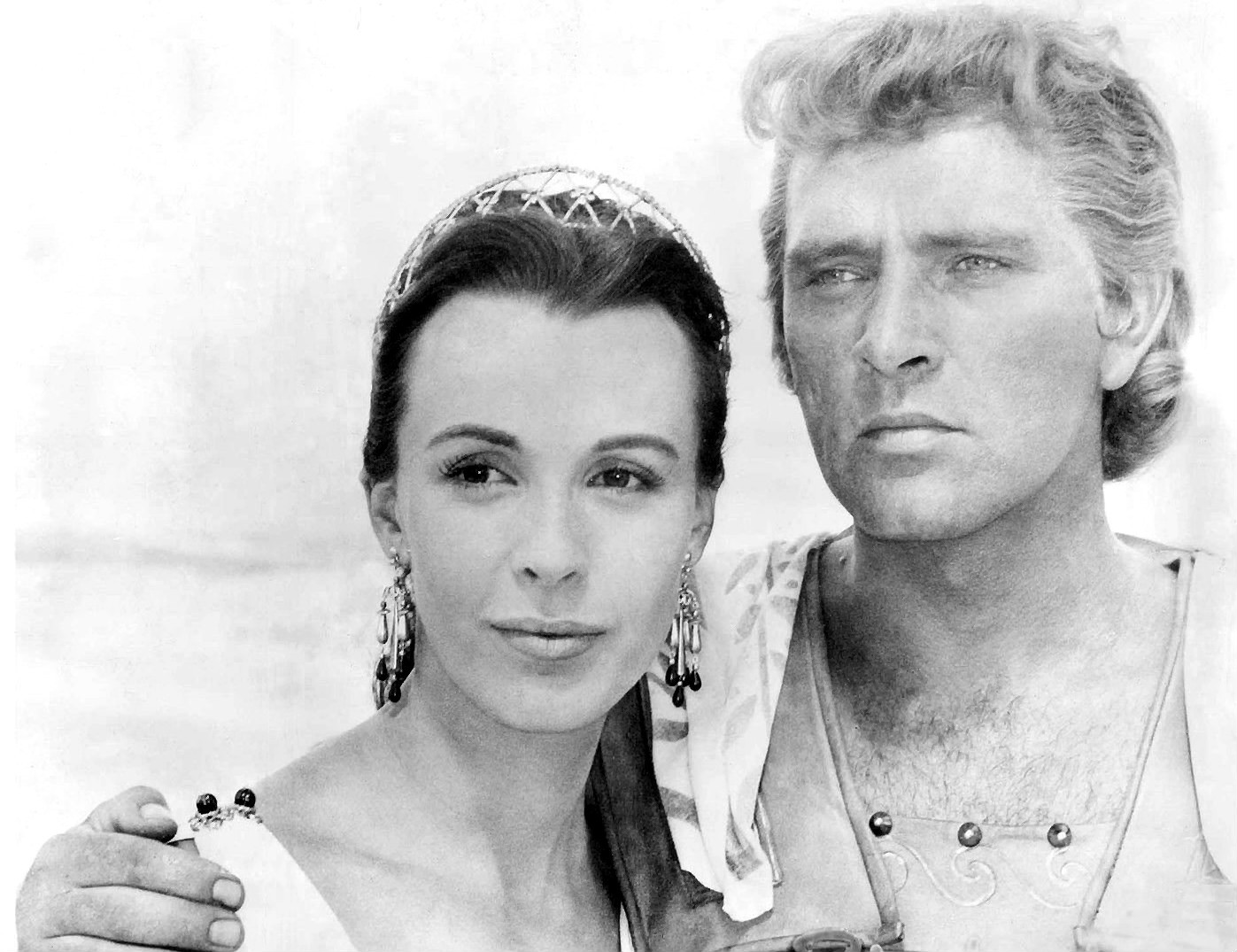
Claire Bloom as Barsine, with Richard Burton as Alexander, in Alexander the Great (1956)

She was subsequently featured in a number of "costume" roles in films such as Alexander the Great (1956), The Brothers Karamazov (1958), The Buccaneer (1958), and The Wonderful World of the Brothers Grimm (1962). Bloom also appeared in Laurence Olivier's film version of Richard III (1955), in which she played Lady Anne, Ibsen's A Doll's House (1973) for which she won Best Actress award at Taormina International Film Festival, The Outrage (1964) with Paul Newman and Laurence Harvey, as well as the films Look Back in Anger (1959) and The Spy Who Came in from the Cold (1965), both with Richard Burton. Of Bloom's character in Spy, novelist David Plante writes that "Claire's refined beauty appears to be one with the refinement of a culture she represents as an actress." In a 2002 interview with Michael Shelden, Bloom said of Burton, "He had it all: intelligence, physical beauty, an incredible voice. There was no one else like him. When we were at the Old Vic, he proved that a working-class actor could make it, and I was proud of him. I thought he set a great example in a society that was, and still is, so preoccupied with class and accent."

=== 1970–1989: Theatre roles and acclaim ===
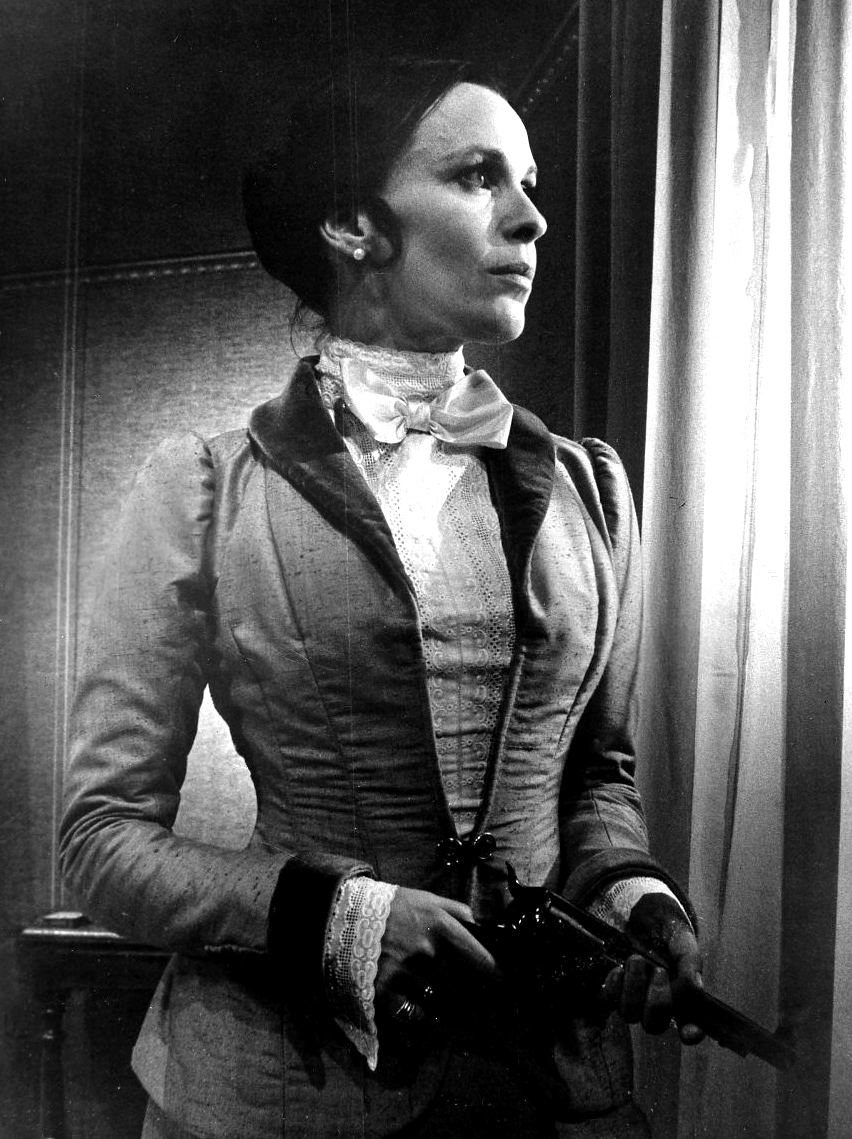
In Broadway stage play Hedda Gabler, 1971

Bloom has appeared in a number of plays and theatrical works in both London and New York. Those works include Look Back in Anger; Rashomon; 'Duel of Angels' (by Jean Giraudoux), co-starring with Vivien Leigh, in 1958; and Bloom's favourite role, that of Blanche DuBois, in a revival of the Tennessee Williams play, A Streetcar Named Desire, which played in London in 1974. Critic Clive Barnes described the play as a "notable example of what the classic revival should be – well groomed, but thoughtful, expressive, illuminating." Another critic writes that Bloom's portrayal of Blanche featured "remarkable layers of vitality and tenderness", and playwright Williams stated, "I declare myself absolutely wild about Claire Bloom." Bloom has also performed in one-woman shows that included monologues from several of her stage performances. She also starred in the 1976 Broadway revival of The Innocents. In the 1960s she began to play more contemporary roles, including an unhinged housewife in The Chapman Report, a psychologist opposite Cliff Robertson's Oscar-winning role in Charly, and Theodora in The Haunting. She played Hera in Clash of the Titans, reuniting her with Olivier who played Zeus.

Bloom has appeared in numerous roles on television such as her portrayal of Lady Marchmain in Brideshead Revisited (1981). In 1996, she wrote, "I still find it puzzling when I am told I played a manipulative and heartless woman; that is not how I saw her. Lady Marchmain is deeply religious, and her dilemma includes trying to raise a wilful brood of children on her own, while instilling them with her rigid observance of the Catholic code. Sebastian is both an alcoholic and a homosexual, and from her point of view, he lives in a state of mortal sin. She has to fight for his soul by any means in her power, with the knowledge that her efforts may lead to his destruction. A born crusader, the Marchioness confronts her difficult choices head on; her rigidity of purpose, which I don't in any way share, is understandable in context. The aspect that rings most true is her sense of being an outsider, a Catholic in Protestant England. Not such a leap from being a Jew in Protestant England as one would imagine."

Other work includes two prominent BBC Television productions for director Rudolph Cartier: co-starring with Sean Connery in Anna Karenina (1961), and playing Cathy in Wuthering Heights with Keith Michell as Heathcliff (1962). She also appeared as First Lady Edith Wilson in Backstairs at the White House (1979); as Joy Gresham, the wife of C.S. Lewis in Shadowlands for which she received the BAFTA Award as Best Actress (1985).

=== 1990–2022: Television work and later roles ===
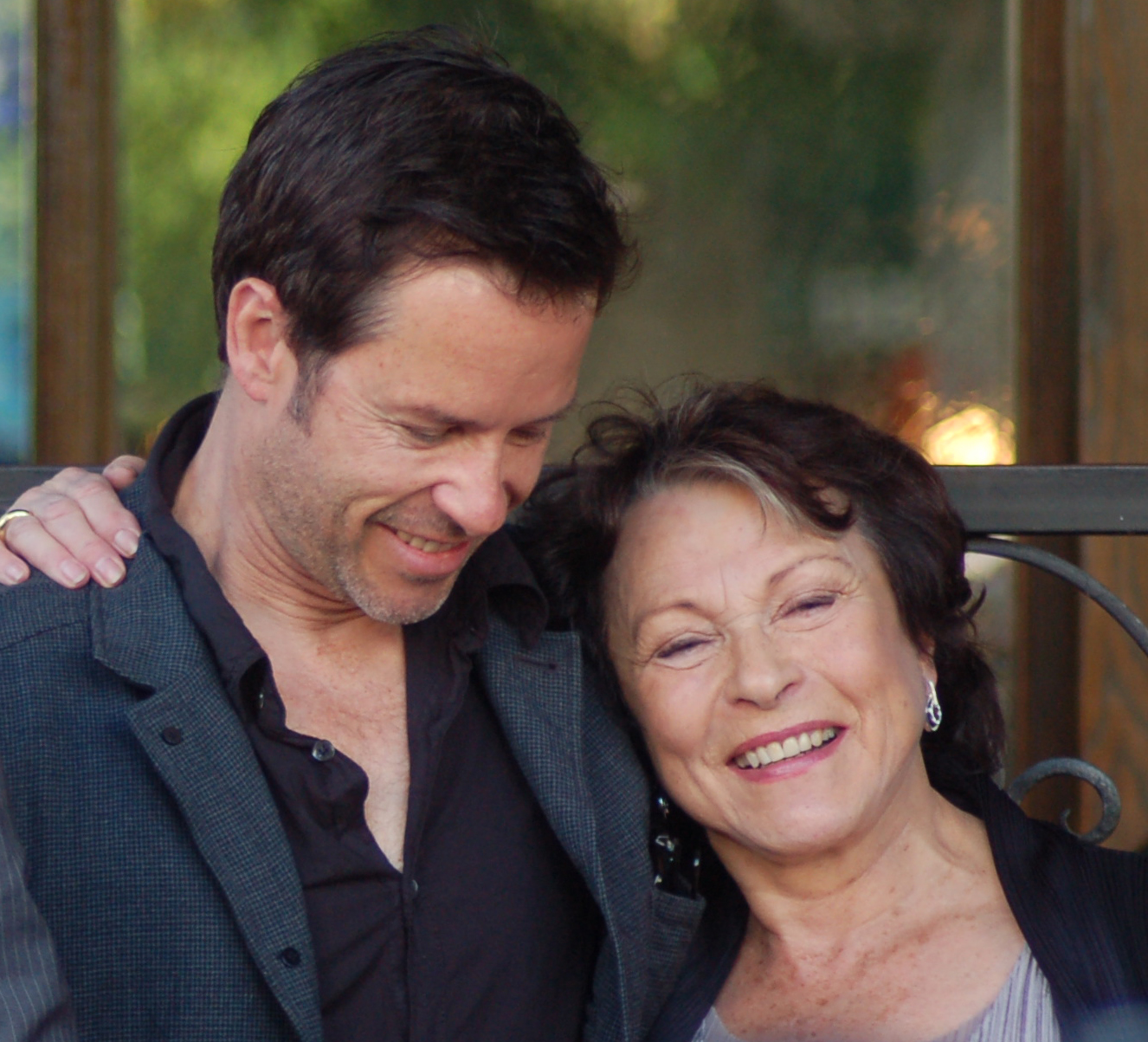
Bloom with Guy Pearce, a fellow actor in The King's Speech, January 2011

She also appeared in the Woody Allen films Crimes and Misdemeanors (1989) and Mighty Aphrodite (1995). She appeared in the Sylvester Stallone film Daylight (1996). Later appearances in films included her portrayal of Queen Mary in the 2010 Oscar winning British film The King's Speech and her portrayal of Eva Rose opposite Jerry Lewis in the 2016 film Max Rose. In television she acted in The Mirror Crack'd, the last of the BBC Miss Marple adaptations in 1992; and as the older Sophy in the serial The Camomile Lawn (1992) on Britain's Channel 4. Recent mini-series work includes The Ten Commandments (2006) and Summer of Rockets. On continuing television series, she has appeared on the New York-based Law & Order: Criminal Intent. From 1994 to 1995, she portrayed villainess Orlena Grimaldi on the daytime drama As the World Turns. She also had major roles in several of the BBC Television Shakespeare presentations and has led workshops on Shakespearean performance practices.

In 2003, Bloom did a stage reading of Milton's Samson Agonistes along with actor John Neville at Bryn Mawr College at the behest of poet Karl Kirchwey. In December 2006, she appeared on the London stage in Arthur Allan Seidelman's production of Six Dance Lessons in Six Weeks by Richard Alfieri, a two-hander in which she co-starred with Billy Zane. In October 2007, she appeared opposite Peter Bowles in Love Letters at the Théâtre Princesse Grace, Monte Carlo, directed by Marc Sinden, as part of his British Theatre Season, Monaco. In 2008, she guest starred in New Tricks as actress Helen Brownlow. The story concerned the murder of Brownlow's husband whilst they were in a play together.

In December 2009 and January 2010, she appeared in the two-part Doctor Who story "The End of Time" as a mysterious Time Lord credited only as "The Woman". Series executive producer Russell T Davies revealed in his 2010 book The Writer's Tale that the character is supposed to be the Doctor's mother. In 2010, she guest starred as Jill Peters in The Bill in the episode "Taking a Stand" and played Queen Mary in The King's Speech. In September 2012, she appeared in concert at the Joseph Meyerhoff Symphony Hall, Baltimore, Maryland, as the narrator in a performance of Leonard Bernstein's Kaddish, with the Baltimore Symphony Orchestra conducted by Marin Alsop.

Between 2005 and 2022, Bloom appeared in several episodes of ITV's Doc Martin as Margaret Ellingham, the estranged mother of the title character, Dr. Martin Ellingham; in the show's final episode she appears as a ghost. In 2015 she appeared as Matilda Stowe in ITV's Midsomer Murders, in the episode titled "A Vintage Murder". In 2019, she appeared as Aunt Mary in the Stephen Poliakoff BBC TV mini-series, Summer of Rockets.

== Personal life ==
=== Marriages ===
Bloom has married three times. Her first marriage, in 1959, was to actor Rod Steiger, whom she met when they both performed in the play Rashomon. Their daughter is opera singer Anna Steiger. Steiger and Bloom divorced in 1969. In that same year, Bloom married producer Hillard Elkins. The marriage lasted for three years, and the couple divorced in 1972. Bloom's third marriage on 29 April 1990, was to writer Philip Roth, her longtime companion. They divorced in 1995.

=== Memoir ===
Bloom has written two memoirs about her life and career. The first, Limelight and After: The Education of an Actress, was published in 1982 and was an in-depth look at her career and the film and stage roles she had portrayed. Her second book, Leaving a Doll's House: A Memoir, published in 1996, went into greater details about her personal life; she discussed not only her marriages but also her affairs with Richard Burton, Laurence Olivier, and Yul Brynner. The book created a stir when Bloom described her former marriage to Roth. It offers what historian and Roth biographer Steven Zipperstein has characterized as a "bleak, acidic portrayal of their marriage . . . with most reviewers taking its accuracy for granted," although she herself would later admit to her inability to care for Roth when he suffered from "severe mental anguish so overwhelming that he admitted himself as a psychiatric patient to Silver Hill Hospital." Soon after, Roth wrote a "revenge novel", I Married a Communist (1998), in which the character of Eve Frame appeared to represent Bloom.

== Acting credits ==
=== Film ===
Year	Title	Role	Notes
1948	The Blind Goddess	Mary Dearing	
1952	The King and the Mockingbird	The Shepherdess	Voice; English version
1952	Limelight	Thereza	
1953	Innocents in Paris	Susan	
1953	The Man Between	Susanne Mallison	
1955	Richard III	Lady Anne	
1956	Alexander the Great	Barsine	
1958	The Brothers Karamazov	Katya	
1958	The Buccaneer	Bonnie Brown	
1959	Look Back in Anger	Helena Charles	
1960	Brainwashed	Irene Andreny	
1962	The Wonderful World of the Brothers Grimm	Dorothea Grimm	
1962	The Chapman Report	Naomi Shields	
1963	80,000 Suspects	Julie Monks	
1963	The Haunting	Theodora	
1963	Il maestro di Vigevano	Ada	
1964	Alta infedeltà	Laura	
1964	The Outrage	Wife	
1965	The Spy Who Came in from the Cold	Nan Perry	
1968	Charly	Alice Kinnian	
1969	The Illustrated Man	Felicia	
1969	Three into Two Won't Go	Frances Howard	
1971	A Severed Head	Honor Klein	
1971	Red Sky at Morning	Ann Arnold	
1973	A Doll's House	Nora Helmer	
1977	Islands in the Stream	Audrey	
1981	Clash of the Titans	Hera	
1985	Déjà Vu	Eleanor Harvey	
1987	Sammy and Rosie Get Laid	Alice	
1989	Crimes and Misdemeanors	Miriam Rosenthal	
1991	The Princess and the Goblin	Great Great Grandmother Irene	Voice
1995	Mad Dogs and Englishmen	Liz Stringer	
1995	Mighty Aphrodite	Mrs. Sloan	
1996	Daylight	Eleanor Trilling	
1998	Wrestling WIth Alligators	Lulu Fraker	
2002	The Book of Eve	Eva Smallwood	
2003	The Republic of Love	Onion	
2003	Charlie: The Life and Art of Charles Chaplin	Herself	
2003	Imagining Argentina	Sara Sternberg	
2004	Daniel And The Superdogs	Claire Martin	
2006	Kalamazoo?	Eleanor	
2010	The King's Speech	Queen Mary	
2012	And While We Were Here	Grandma Eves	
2013	Max Rose	Eva Rose	
2018	Miss Dalí	Maggie	

=== Television ===
Year	Title	Role	Notes
1952	BBC Sunday Night Theatre	Martine	Season 3 episode 19: Martine
1957	Goodyear Television Playhouse	Rose	Season 6 episode 8: "First Love"
1957	Robert Montgomery Presents	Queen Victoria	Season 8 episode 31: Victoria Regina
1958	Shirley Temple's Storybook	Beauty	Season 1 episode 1: "Beauty and the Beast"
1959	Playhouse 90	Hypatia	Season 4 episode 3: "Misalliance"
1961	Anna Karenina	Anna Karenina	TV movie
1979	Backstairs at the White House	Edith Bolling Galt Wilson	TV mini-series
1980	Hamlet	Gertrude	TV movie
1981	Brideshead Revisited	Lady Marchmain	6 episodes
1983	Separate Tables	Miss Cooper	TV movie
1984	Ellis Island	Rebecca Weiller	3 episodes
1985	Ann and Debbie	Debbie	TV movie
1985	Shadowlands	Joy Davidman	TV movie
1985	Promises to Keep	Sally	TV movie
1985	Time and the Conways	Mrs Conway	TV movie
1986	Oedipus the King	Jocasta	
1987	Queenie	Vicky Kelly	2 episodes
1987	Intimate Contact	Ruth Gregory	4 episodes
1988	The Lady and the Highwayman	Lady Emma Darlington	TV movie
1988	Beryl Markham: A Shadow on the Sun	Lady Delamere	TV movie
1991	The Camomile Lawn	Older Sophy	Mini-series
1992	It's Nothing Personal	Evelyn Whitloff	TV movie
1992	Miss Marple: The Mirror Crack'd from Side to Side	Marina Gregg	TV movie
1994	Remember	Anne Devereaux Rawlings	TV movie
1994	A Village Affair	Cecily Jordan	TV movie
1994	As The World Turns	Orlena Grimaldi	Soap opera
1996	Family Money	Fran Pye	Mini series
1997	What the Deaf Man Heard	Mrs. Tynan	TV movie
2000	Yesterday's Children	Maggie	TV movie
2000	Love and Murder	Nina Love	TV movie
2004	Law & Order: Criminal Intent	Marion Whitney	Season 3 episode 12: "Unrequited"
2005, 2013, 2022	Doc Martin	Margaret Ellingham	5 episodes
2006	Agatha Christie's Marple	Aunt Ada	Season 2 episode 3: "By the Pricking of My Thumbs"
2008	New Tricks	Helen Brownlow	Season 5 episode 2: "Final Curtain"
2009–2010	Doctor Who	The Woman	2 episodes; The End of Time
2010	The Bill	Jill Peters	Season 26 episode 25: "Taking a Stand"
2015	Midsomer Murders	Matilda Stowe	Season 17 episode 4: A Vintage Murder
2019	Summer of Rockets	Aunt Mary	Mini-series

=== Theatre ===
Year	Title	Role	Venue	Ref.
1950	Ring Round the Moon		Gielgud Theatre	
1956	Richard II	Queen to King Richard	Winter Garden Theatre, Broadway	
1956	Romeo and Juliet	Juliet	Winter Garden Theatre, Broadway	
1959	Rashomon	Wife	Music Box Theatre, Broadway	
1971	A Doll's House	Nora Helmer	Playhouse Theater, Broadway	
1971	Hedda Gabler	Hedda Tesman	Playhouse Theater, Broadway	
1972	Vivat! Vivat Regina!	Mary Queen of Scots	Broadhurst Theatre, Broadway	
1974	A Streetcar Named Desire	Blanche DuBois	Piccadilly Theatre	
1976	The Innocents	Miss Bolton	Morosco Theatre, Broadway	
1998	Electra	Clytemnestra	Ethel Barrymore Theatre, Broadway	

== Awards and honours ==
Bloom was appointed a Commander of the Order of the British Empire (CBE) in the 2013 Birthday Honours for services to drama.

Year	Association	Category	Nominated work	Result	Ref.
1952	BAFTA Award	Most Promising Newcomer	Limelight	Won	
1982	BAFTA Award	Best Actress	Brideshead Revisited	Nominated	
1986	BAFTA Award	Best Actress	Shadowlands	Won	
1982	Primetime Emmy Award	Outstanding Supporting Actress in a Limited Series or a Special	Brideshead Revisited	Nominated	
1967	New York Emmy Award	Individuals	Sunday Showcase	Won	
1979	Grammy Award	Best Spoken Word Album	Wuthering Heights	Nominated	
1971	Drama Desk Award	Outstanding Performance	Hedda Gabler / A Doll's House	Won	
1999	Tony Award	Best Featured Actress in a Play	Electra	Nominated	
