= The Ghost Writer =

1979 novel by Philip Roth

- First edition cover
- Author: Philip Roth
- Language: English
- Series: Zuckerman Bound
- Genre: Novel
- Publisher: Farrar, Straus & Giroux
- Publication date: 19 September 1979
- Publication place: United States
- Media type: Print (hardback & paperback)
- Pages: 180 pp
- ISBN: 0-374-16189-5
- OCLC: 4933340
- Dewey Decimal: 813/.5/4
- LC Class: PZ4.R8454 Gh PS3568.O855
- Followed by: Zuckerman Unbound

The Ghost Writer is a 1979 novel by the American author Philip Roth. It is the first of Roth's novels narrated by Nathan Zuckerman, one of the author's putative fictional alter egos, and constitutes the first book in his Zuckerman Bound trilogy. The novel touches on themes common to many Roth works, including identity, the responsibilities of authors to their subjects, and the condition of Jews in America. Parts of the novel are a reprise of The Diary of Anne Frank.

== Plot introduction ==
Nathan Zuckerman is a promising young writer who spends a night in the home of E.I. Lonoff (a portrait, it has been argued, of Bernard Malamud or Henry Roth, or a composite of both), an established author whom Zuckerman idolizes. Also staying in the Lonoff home is Amy Bellette, a young woman with a vague past whom the narrator apparently comes to suspect of being Anne Frank, living in the United States anonymously, having survived the Holocaust. Many have observed similarities between Lonoff and Isaac Bashevis Singer.

== Television movie ==
In 1983 a television adaptation was made of the book in the UK. It was directed by Tristram Powell and starred Rose Arrick, Claire Bloom, Sam Wanamaker, Cecile Mann, MacIntyre Dixon, Mark Linn-Baker, Ralph Morse, Joseph Wiseman, and Patricia Fellows.

== Critical reception ==
The book was widely praised at publication. In The New York Times Book Review, critic Harold Bloom said of the three collected Zuckerman novels, "Zuckerman Bound merits something reasonably close to the highest level of esthetic praise for tragicomedy."

In 2018, Esquire listed The Ghost Writer as one of Roth's seven essential books.

== Awards ==
The Pulitzer committee for fiction selected The Ghost Writer for the prize in 1980. The Pulitzer board, which has final say over awarding the prize, overrode their decision and chose Norman Mailer's The Executioner's Song instead. The book was also a finalist for the 1980 National Book Award.

== Exit Ghost ==
In 2007, Roth published the novel Exit Ghost, which Michiko Kakutani in The New York Times called "elegiac" and "a kind of valedictory bookend to The Ghost Writer."
