= Exit Ghost =

2007 novel by Philip Roth

- First edition cover
- Author: Philip Roth
- Language: English
- Genre: Novel
- Publisher: Houghton Mifflin
- Publication date: September 2007
- Publication place: United States
- Media type: Print (hardcover)
- Pages: 292
- ISBN: 0-618-91547-8
- OCLC: 144570543
- Dewey Decimal: 813/.54 22
- LC Class: PS3568.O855 E95 2007

Exit Ghost is a 2007 novel by Philip Roth. It is the ninth, and last, novel featuring his character Nathan Zuckerman.

== Plot summary ==
The plot centers on Zuckerman's return home to New York after eleven years in New England. The purpose of Zuckerman's journey, which he takes the week before the 2004 U.S. presidential election, is for him to undergo a medical procedure that might cure or reduce his incontinence. While in New York, Zuckerman meets Amy Bellette, whom he had last encountered during a visit to the writer E.I. Lonoff's house in December, 1956, as depicted in Roth's novel The Ghost Writer. Zuckerman also agrees to a housing swap with a young writing couple, Billy Davidoff and Jamie Logan, and quickly becomes attracted to Logan. In his hotel room at night, Zuckerman writes a play, He and She, composed of imagined conversations between him and Logan.

Through Davidoff and Logan, Zuckerman meets Richard Kliman, a young, brash Harvard graduate who is working on a biography of Lonoff. Kliman was Logan's boyfriend in college. Because of Kliman's zealous interest in a potentially scandalous secret from Lonoff's adolescence, neither Zuckerman nor Bellette wants to help him complete his project. Zuckerman may also be motivated by his own confused feelings about Logan and Kliman.

== Title ==
The stage direction, "exit ghost" appears in three of William Shakespeare's plays: Hamlet, Macbeth and Julius Caesar. In a BBC interview, Roth stated that using this direction as a title "came to me because of Macbeth. Last year in the summer I was going to see a production of Macbeth here in America, and I re-read the script that afternoon, and I came upon the Banquo scene, ghost scene, and it just leaped out – 'exit ghost' – and that's the title of my book, so I just lifted it." In the novel Jamie and Billy read Macbeth aloud to each other, marveling grimly at its relevance to George W. Bush's first administration.

The title also refers to that of the first Zuckerman book, The Ghost Writer. At one point, Bellette says to Zuckerman that Lonoff (whom she imagines talking to her from beyond the grave) told her, "Reading/writing people, we are finished, we are ghosts witnessing the end of a literary era."

== Critical reception ==
Critic Michiko Kakutani in The New York Times called the novel "elegiac" and "a kind of valedictory bookend" to The Ghost Writer, adding "Mr. Roth has created a melancholy, if occasionally funny, meditation on aging, mortality, loneliness and the losses that come with the passage of time."

Critics have considered that Lonoff, deceased and neglected, was modelled partly on the writer Bernard Malamud.
