= Hillard Elkins =

American theater and film producer (1929–2010)

- Born: Hillard Elkins; October 18, 1929; New York City, U.S.
- Died: December 1, 2010 (aged 81); Los Angeles, California, U.S.
- Education: Brooklyn College
- Occupations: Talent manager, theatrical producer, film producer
- Years active: 1949–2010
- Employer: William Morris Agency (formerly)
- Known for: Oh! Calcutta! Golden Boy (Broadway musical); Alice's Restaurant; A New Leaf; Richard Pryor: Live in Concert
- Spouse(s): Ethel Ellen Schell (before 2010) Mary Ellen Terry (before 2010) Claire Bloom (m. 1969; div. 1972) Judith A. Wilson (before 2010) Sandi Love (before 2010)
- Awards: Daytime Emmy Award (1998)

Hillard (Hilly) Elkins (October 18, 1929 – December 1, 2010) was an American theatre and film producer.

== Life and career ==
Born in Brooklyn, Elkins attended Erasmus Hall and Midwood High Schools and Brooklyn College. At the age of eighteen he already had his degree and was studying law while working in the mail room at the William Morris Agency, quickly moving up the ranks to agent and then head of the theatrical department. After serving in the Korean War by making training films in Manhattan, he returned to agency work, but in 1953 left to open his own management company, where he represented James Coburn, Robert Culp, Steve McQueen, Mel Brooks, Herbert Ross, Charles Strouse, and Lee Adams.

Elkins turned to Broadway theatre producing in 1962 with the Garson Kanin play Come on Strong. The following year, he saw former client Sammy Davis Jr. performing at the Prince of Wales Theatre in London, and approached him about starring in a musical version of Clifford Odets' Golden Boy. When Davis expressed interest, Elkins approached Odets to adapt his 1937 hit play and write the book for the musical (revised by William Gibson when Odets died in August 1963) and hired Strouse and Adams to compose the score. The 1964 Broadway production, directed by Arthur Penn, earned Elkins Tony Award nominations for Best Musical and Best Producer of a Musical. Additional Broadway credits include Oh! Calcutta!, The Rothschilds, and Hedda Gabler and A Doll's House, the latter two with his then-wife Claire Bloom (they married in 1969 and divorced in 1972).

Elkins reunited with director Penn for his first film production, Alice's Restaurant (1969) with Arlo Guthrie. This was followed by the Golden Globe-nominated film A New Leaf (1971), screen adaptations of Oh! Calcutta! (1972) and A Doll's House (1973), and Richard Pryor: Live in Concert (1979).

For television, Elkins produced the documentaries Pippin: His Life and Times (1981), Sex, Censorship and the Silver Screen (1996), An Evening with Quentin Crisp (1999), and Steve McQueen: The Essence of Cool (2005).

Elkins owned the screen rights to the Kurt Vonnegut novel Cat's Cradle.

Elkins was the subject of a 1972 book, The Producer by Christopher Davis.

He left behind two sons Johnny and Daniel, his wife Sandi Love and granddaughter Ellen.

== Additional awards and nominations ==
- 1998 Daytime Emmy Award for Outstanding Children's Special (In His Father's Shoes, winner)
- 1997 CableACE Award for Best Children's Special, Age 7 and Older (In His Father's Shoes, nominee)
- 1975 Tony Award for Best Play (Sizwe Banzi Is Dead, nominee)
- 1975 Tony Award for Best Play (The Island, nominee)
- 1975 Drama Desk Award for Outstanding New Foreign Play (Sizwe Banzi Is Dead, nominee)
- 1975 Drama Desk Award for Outstanding New Foreign Play (The Island, nominee)
- 1971 Tony Award for Best Musical (The Rothschilds, nominee)
