= Nathan Zuckerman =

- First appearance: My Life as a Man
- Last appearance: Exit Ghost
- Created by: Philip Roth

In-universe information
- Occupation: Novelist
- Religion: Judaism (non-practicing)
- Nationality: American

Nathan Zuckerman is a fictional character created by the writer Philip Roth, who uses him as his protagonist and narrator, a type of alter ego, in many of his novels.

== Character ==
Roth first created a character named Nathan Zuckerman in the novel My Life as a Man (1974), where he is the "product" of another fictional Roth figure, the writer Peter Tarnopol (making Zuckerman, in his original form, an "alter-alter-ego"). Discrepancies (including date of birth, details of his upbringing, and personal background) exist between the characters, leading most to consider this an early version, and not necessarily the Zuckerman around whom subsequent novels would revolve. In later books, Roth uses Zuckerman as a protagonist, starting with the 1979 novel The Ghost Writer, where he is a writing apprentice on a pilgrimage to cull the wisdom of the reclusive author E. I. Lonoff. In Zuckerman Unbound (1981), he has become established as a novelist and must deal with the fall-out from his ribald comedic novel Carnovsky. Though wildly successful, the novel has brought to Zuckerman unwanted attention from both readers and his family, who object to their portrayal in his work.

Exit Ghost (2007) is the ninth book in the Zuckerman series, and is the last Zuckerman novel. The book explores Zuckerman's life as an older man, returning to New York City after an extended period of seclusion in the Berkshires.

== Analysis ==
By the mid-1990s, though, Roth tamped down on the self-referentiality. He reintroduced Zuckerman as witness and narrator in a trilogy of historical novels: American Pastoral (1997), I Married a Communist (1998), and The Human Stain (2000), set in the period from the 1960s into the 1990s. The British Indian author Salman Rushdie used Zuckerman as a character in his novel The Ground Beneath Her Feet (1999), where in an alternate universe, it is the literary alter-egos (and their novels) that are real.

== Portrayals ==
Actors who have portrayed Nathan Zuckerman include Mark Linn-Baker (in the 1984 television adaptation of The Ghost Writer), Gary Sinise (in the 2003 film adaptation of The Human Stain) and David Strathairn (in the 2016 film adaptation of American Pastoral).

== List of Zuckerman novels ==
- The Ghost Writer (1979)
- Zuckerman Unbound (1981)
- The Anatomy Lesson (1983)
- The Prague Orgy (1985)

(The above four books are collected as Zuckerman Bound)

- The Counterlife (1986)
- American Pastoral (1997)
- I Married a Communist (1998)
- The Human Stain (2000)
- Exit Ghost (2007)

== External resources ==
- "Philip Roth: The Zuckerman books". Salon. March 26, 2002. Archived from the original on November 5, 2007.
- Nathan Zuckerman on IMDb
