= Zuckerman Unbound =

1981 novel by the American author Philip Roth

- First edition cover
- Author: Philip Roth
- Language: English
- Genre: Fiction
- Publisher: Farrar, Straus and Giroux
- Publication date: 1981
- Publication place: United States
- Media type: Print (Hardback & Paperback)
- Pages: 225
- ISBN: 0-374-29945-5
- OCLC: 7307132
- Preceded by: The Ghost Writer
- Followed by: The Anatomy Lesson

Zuckerman Unbound is a 1981 novel by the American author Philip Roth.

== Nathan Zuckerman ==
The novel resumes the story of Roth's fictional alter ego Nathan Zuckerman that was inaugurated by Roth's previous novel The Ghost Writer.

== Quiz show scandals ==
The novel—through its supporting cast—explores the quiz show scandals of the 1950s. In Roth's novel, Herb Stempel and Charles Van Doren are called Alvin Pepler and Hewlett Lincoln.

== Plot summary ==
Zuckerman has achieved meteoric acclaim and notoriety with Carnovsky, a coming-of-age sex romp that differs remarkably from Zuckerman's previously Jamesian fiction.

== Zuckerman Bound ==
The first and last books in the initial Zuckerman trilogy are 1979's The Ghost Writer and 1983's The Anatomy Lesson. The three were collected and republished in 1985 as Zuckerman Bound.

== Critical reception ==
Critic John Lahr, in New York Magazine, called the novel "fascinating." In The New Yorker, John Updike remarked, "Always one of the most intelligent and energetic of American writers, he has now become one of the most scrupulous." In Time, R. Z. Sheppard praised Roth's "comic genius." In The New York Times Book Review, critic Harold Bloom said of the three collected Zuckerman novels, "Zuckerman Bound merits something reasonably close to the highest level of esthetic praise for tragicomedy."

== See also ==
- Quiz show scandals
- Quiz Show (1994)
- Herb Stempel
- Zuckerman Bound
