= The Human Stain =

2000 novel by Philip Roth

- First edition cover
- Author: Philip Roth
- Cover artist: Michaela Sullivan
- Language: English
- Publisher: Houghton Mifflin
- Publication date: May 2000
- Publication place: United States
- Media type: Print (hardback and paperback)
- Pages: 352
- ISBN: 0-618-05945-8
- OCLC: 43109968
- Dewey Decimal: 813/.54 21
- LC Class: PS3568.O855 H8 2000

The Human Stain is a novel by Philip Roth, published May 5, 2000. The book is set in Western Massachusetts in the late 1990s. Its narrator is 65-year-old author Nathan Zuckerman, who appears in several earlier Roth novels, including two books that form a trilogy with The Human Stain, American Pastoral (1997) and I Married a Communist (1998). Zuckerman acts largely as an observer as the complex story of the protagonist, Coleman Silk, a retired professor of classics, is slowly revealed.

A national bestseller, The Human Stain was adapted in 2003 as a film by the same name directed by Robert Benton.

== Synopsis ==
Coleman Silk is a former professor and dean of the faculty at Athena College, a fictional institution in the Berkshires of western Massachusetts, where he still lives. The story is narrated by Roth's recurring character Nathan Zuckerman, a writer and a neighbor of Silk.

In 1996, two years before the main action of the novel, Silk is accused of racism by two African-American students after he wonders aloud whether the reason they have missed all his classes so far is that they are "spooks". Though Silk has no idea they are black, they and others at the college see the term as a racial epithet. When the uproar is about to die down, in Silk's view, he resigns. Soon afterward, his wife, Iris, dies of a stroke that Silk feels is caused by the stress of defending him.

In the summer of 1998, just after Iris dies, the 71-year-old Silk approaches Zuckerman and asks him to write a book on the incident. Ranting about it, Silk blames the widespread condemnation of him on, among other things, antisemitism. Zuckerman is uninterested, but the two begin a brief friendship and Silk tells him his life story. Zuckerman is surprised to learn that Silk is in a relationship with Faunia Farley, a 34-year-old woman who works as a janitor at the college and who everyone including Silk believes (falsely, as it turns out) is illiterate.

Zuckerman's version of the story starts when Coleman Silk is a light-skinned black boy in East Orange, New Jersey. Coleman becomes a straight-A student and, in defiance of his father, a quick and clever boxer. A boxing coach suggests that he pass as a Jew. During World War II he drops out of Howard University and joins the Navy, listing his race as white.

After the war he studies at New York University and lives in Greenwich Village. When he introduces a white girlfriend to his family and they realize he is "passing", his brother cuts him off from the family. Silk marries Iris, a non-religious Jewish woman, and has four children. His wife and children are unaware of his ancestry; he invents a Jewish background and tells them he's unable to get in touch with his few living relatives.

A successful academic career in classics leads to his position of dean, where he raises the faculty's standards by forcing out less academically accomplished professors. Decades later, he returns to teaching and is accused of racism as described above.

Some time after his approach to Zuckerman, Silk loses most contact with the people other than Faunia whom he is on good terms with, including his children and Zuckerman. In November, Silk and Faunia Farley are killed in a car accident, which Zuckerman suspects was caused by Farley's jealous and abusive ex-husband Lester Farley, a Vietnam War veteran suffering from post-traumatic stress disorder. At Silk's funeral, his sister Ernestine reveals his secret to Zuckerman. The novel ends with an encounter between Les Farley and Zuckerman, who is en route to New Jersey to have dinner with the Silk family.

Especially in the second half of the novel, there are scenes detailing the thoughts and feelings of other characters, notably Faunia, Les Farley, and Delphine Roux, Silk's main antagonist at Athena. Zuckerman gives his sources for some conversations at which he was not present, but he also says, "I imagine. I am forced to imagine. [...] It is my job. It's now all I do."

== Background ==
The Human Stain is set in 1998 in the United States, during the period of President Bill Clinton's impeachment hearings and scandal over Monica Lewinsky. (Note: Roth writes on page 2 of The Human Stain: "In the Congress, in the press, and on the networks, the righteous grandstanding creeps, crazy to blame, deplore, and punish, were everywhere out moralizing to beat the band: all of them in a calculated frenzy with what Hawthorne ... identified in the incipient country of long ago as 'the persecuting spirit'; all of them eager to enact the astringent rituals of purification that would excise the erection from the executive branch, thereby making things cozy and safe enough for Senator Lieberman's ten-year-old daughter to watch TV with her embarrassed daddy again.") It is the third of Roth's novels that take on large social themes.

Roth described in a 2012 piece for The New Yorker how his novel was inspired by an event in the life of his friend Melvin Tumin, a "professor of sociology at Princeton for some thirty years." Tumin was subject to a "witch hunt" but was ultimately found blameless in a matter involving use of allegedly racial language concerning two African American students.

== Critical response ==
=== Themes ===
The Human Stain is the third in a trilogy, following American Pastoral and I Married a Communist, in which Roth explores American morality and its effects. Here he examines the cut-throat and, at times, petty, atmosphere in American academia, in which "political correctness" was upheld. Roth said he wrote the trilogy to reflect periods in the 20th century – the McCarthy years, the Vietnam War, and President Bill Clinton's impeachment – that he thinks are the "historical moments in post-war American life that have had the greatest impact on my generation."

Critic Michiko Kakutani said that in The Human Stain, Roth "explores issues of identity and self-invention in America which he had long explored in earlier works." She wrote the following interpretation:

It is a book that shows how the public Zeitgeist can shape, even destroy, an individual's life, a book that takes all of Roth's favorite themes of identity and rebellion and generational strife and refracts them not through the narrow prism of the self but through a wide-angle lens that exposes the fissures and discontinuities of 20th-century life. ... When stripped of its racial overtones, Roth's book echoes a story he has told in novel after novel. Indeed, it closely parallels the story of Nathan Zuckerman, himself another dutiful, middle-class boy from New Jersey who rebelled against his family and found himself exiled, 'unbound' as it were, from his roots.

Mark Shechner writes in his 2003 study that in the novel, Roth "explores issues in American society that force a man such as Silk to hide his background, to the point of not having a personal history to share with his children or family. He wanted to pursue an independent course unbounded by racial restraints, but became what he once despised. His downfall to some extent is engineered by Delphine Roux, the young, female, elite, French intellectual who is dismayed to find herself in a New England outpost of sorts, and sees Silk as having become deadwood in academia, the very thing he abhorred at the beginning of his own career."

=== Alleged resemblance to Anatole Broyard ===
In the reviews of the book in both the daily and the Sunday New York Times in 2000, Kakutani and Lorrie Moore suggested that the central character of Coleman Silk might have been inspired by Anatole Broyard, a well-known New York literary editor of the Times. Other writers in the academic and mainstream press made the same suggestion. After Broyard's death in 1990, it had been revealed that he racially passed during his many years employed as a critic at The New York Times. He was of Louisiana Creole ancestry.

Roth himself stated that he had not known of Broyard's ancestry when he started writing the book and only learned of it months later. In Roth's words, written in "An Open Letter to Wikipedia" and published by The New Yorker: "Neither Broyard nor anyone associated with Broyard had anything to do with my imagining anything in The Human Stain." Roth stated that Coleman Silk was inspired "by an unhappy event in the life of my late friend Melvin Tumin."

== Reception ==
In choosing it for its "Editors' Choice" list of 2000, The New York Times wrote:

When Zuckerman and Silk are together and testing each other, Roth's writing reaches an emotional intensity and a vividness not exceeded in any of his books. The American dream of starting over entirely new has the force of inevitability here, and Roth's judgment clearly is that you can never make it all the way. There is no comfort in this vision, but the tranquility Zuckerman achieves as he tells the story is infectious, and that is a certain reward.

In April 2013, GQ listed The Human Stain as one of the best books of the 21st century. The New York Times likewise, in 2024, listed the novel as one of the best books of the 21st century.

After Roth died, The New York Times asked several prominent authors to name their favorite work by him. Thomas Chatterton Williams chose The Human Stain, writing that "Roth achieves something here that is very difficult to imagine his mostly domesticated descendants even attempting: He steps fully out of his own backyard and dares to imagine what he cannot possibly know by means of his own personal identity. I came to this gem late, as a 33-year-old 'mixed-race' black man who'd just become the father of a blond-haired, blue-eyed 'black' daughter who could pass for Swedish. Flipping through my paperback now, I smile as I reread the dog-eared pages, their margins overflowing with comments to the effect of: How can he possibly know that? There are many ways to display brilliance through narrative, but one of the most difficult — and courageous — is to render the I-who-is-not-I as vividly as one can render the self."

== Awards ==
=== Winner ===
- New York Times "Editors' Choice" (2000)
- Koret Jewish Book Award (2000)
- Chicago Tribune Editor's Pick (2000)
- WH Smith Literary Award (2001)
- National Jewish Book Award (2001)
- PEN/Faulkner Award for Fiction (2001)
- Prix Médicis étranger; Meilleur livre de l'année 2002

=== Finalist ===
- Los Angeles Times Book Prize for fiction (2000)
- L.L. Winship/PEN New England Award (2001)

== Adaptations ==
- The Human Stain was adapted in 2003 into a film by the same name, directed by Robert Benton and starring Anthony Hopkins and Nicole Kidman.

== Sources ==
- Safer, Elaine B. "Tragedy and Farce in Roth's the Human Stain". in Bloom, Harold (ed.) Philip Roth. Chelsea House. ISBN 0-7910-7446-3
- Shechner, Mark (2003). Up Society's Ass, Copper: Rereading Philip Roth. University of Wisconsin Press, ISBN 978-0-299-19354-6
