= The Facts: A Novelist's Autobiography =

1988 book by Philip Roth

First edition cover

The Facts: A Novelist's Autobiography (1988, ISBN 0-679-74905-5) is a book by Philip Roth that traces his life from his childhood in Newark, New Jersey to becoming a successful, widely respected novelist. The autobiographical section is bookended by two letters, one from Roth to his fictional alter-ego Nathan Zuckerman, the other from Zuckerman himself, telling Roth what he sees as problems with the book.

Roth interlaces the present with the past and remote past. The book is divided into six chapters:

1. "Prologue" (About his father)
2. "Safe at Home" (Growing up in a Jewish neighborhood)
3. "Joe College" (College life, first love)
4. "Girl of My Dreams" (Chicago years, the woman who became his first wife)
5. "All in the Family" (Defending himself against Jewish community attacks on his writing)
6. "Now Vee May Perhaps to Begin" (His divorce and death of his first wife)

This book is included in the fifth volume of Philip Roth's collected works Novels and Other Narratives 1986–1991, published by the Library of America.

== Critical reception ==
Kirkus Reviews called the book "a semi-absorbing semi-autobiography that raises as many questions as it answers."
