= I Married a Communist =

1998 novel by Philip Roth

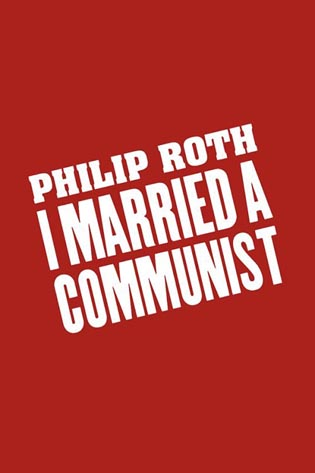
- First edition cover
- Author: Philip Roth
- Language: English
- Genre: Novel
- Publisher: Houghton Mifflin
- Publication date: 1998
- Publication place: United States
- Media type: Print (hardcover)
- Pages: 336
- ISBN: 0-375-70721-2
- OCLC: 244008454

I Married a Communist is a Philip Roth novel concerning the rise and fall of Ira Ringold, known as "Iron Rinn". The story is narrated by Nathan Zuckerman, and is one of a trio of Zuckerman novels Roth wrote in the 1990s depicting the postwar history of Newark, New Jersey, and its residents.

Ira and his brother Murray serve as two immense influences on the school-age Zuckerman, and the story is told as a contemporary reminiscence between Murray and Nathan on Ira's life. Although a communist, Ira became a star in radio theater. Personal conflicts with McCarthyite politicians, a gossip columnist, and his daughter-addled and manipulative wife all combine to destroy Ira and many of those around him.

== Plot ==
The novel is narrated by Nathan Zuckerman, who, now living in seclusion in the Berkshires, spends several evenings in conversation with his former high‑school teacher, Murray Ringold. Their discussions centre on Murray's younger brother, Ira Ringold, a towering, volatile figure who played a formative role in Zuckerman's youth. Through Murray's recollections and Zuckerman's own memories, the novel reconstructs Ira's life from his working‑class upbringing in New Jersey to his rise and fall during the early years of the Cold War.

Ira grows up in a poor Jewish family in an Italian American neighbourhood, developing a fierce temperament that contrasts with Murray's more studious disposition. After a series of manual jobs and service in the Second World War, Ira becomes devoted to the labour organiser Johnny O'Day, whose hard‑line left‑wing politics shape his worldview. Ira eventually finds work as a radio actor, adopting the stage name "Iron Rinn", and becomes a prominent performer on a popular serial drama.

His life changes when he marries Eve Frame, a celebrated radio actress who has carefully reinvented herself from her Brooklyn origins. Their marriage is strained from the outset by Eve's adult daughter, Sylphid, whose hostility and dependence create ongoing conflict within the household. Ira's attempts to persuade Eve to distance herself from Sylphid only deepen the tensions between them.

As anti‑communist sentiment intensifies in the late 1940s and early 1950s, Ira's outspoken political views and his association with left‑wing causes place him under increasing scrutiny. His marriage deteriorates further when Eve discovers his infidelities. Encouraged by politically conservative acquaintances, she collaborates on a memoir titled I Married a Communist, which publicly accuses Ira of being a Soviet agent. The book's publication destroys Ira's career and reputation, leaving him isolated and embittered.

Through Murray's account, Zuckerman also revisits his own intellectual development, recalling how he moved from Ira's ideological fervour to the more aesthetic and philosophical guidance of Leo Glucksman, a University of Chicago academic. The narrative ultimately follows Ira and Eve into their later years, tracing the consequences of their choices and the political climate that shaped their lives. By the time Murray and Zuckerman part, the story of Ira's rise and downfall has been fully recounted, set against the broader backdrop of mid‑century American political and cultural turmoil.

== Reception ==
The novel was praised by Robert Kelly for The New York Times: "Roth explores our expedients and tragedies with a masterly, often unnerving, blend of tenderness, harshness, insight and wit. I Married a Communist is a gripping novel, memorable, its characters hateful and adorable by turns."

== Claire Bloom controversy ==
Some reviewers, especially those in the British press such as Rachelle Thackray of The Independent and Linda Grant of The Guardian, consider the character of Eve Frame — the antisemitic wife who destroys Ira — to be a barely disguised riposte to Roth's ex-wife, Claire Bloom, for her unflattering memoirs, which portrayed Roth as unable to bottle his vanity and incapable of living in the same household with Bloom's daughter, Anna Steiger.

Linda Grant writes of the similarities between Claire Bloom and Eve Frame:

Frame is a Jewish actress, so is Bloom. Frame's second husband is a financier, so was Bloom's. Eve Frame has a daughter who is a harpist, Bloom's girl is an opera singer. Ira tells the daughter to move out, Roth did the same. Ira has an affair with the daughter's best friend; Roth, Bloom alleged, came on to her own daughter's best friend.

She argues I Married a Communist "is not a novel", but rather, "an angry, bitter, resentful mess by a man who might have taken another course."
