= Anna Steiger =

American opera singer

Anna Justine Steiger (born 13 February 1960) is a British and American opera singer who has sung leading soprano and mezzo-soprano roles in British, European and North American opera houses. She has sung many recitals at festivals which have been broadcast live on the BBC, Radio France and the Australian Broadcasting Corporation. In 2015, she was invited to participate in the Australian Chamber Music Festival.

== Early life ==
Steiger was born in Los Angeles, California, the daughter of acclaimed actors Claire Bloom and Rod Steiger.

She trained with Noelle Barker at the Guildhall School of Music in London from 1977 to 1983 and then with Vera Rózsa at the National Opera Studio from 1985 to 1986. She won the Sir Peter Pears Award in 1982, the Richard Tauber Prize in 1984, and the John Christie Award in 1985.

== Career ==
Her professional debut was as Dorabella in Così fan tutte in 1984 with Opera 80. In 1986 she sang the title role in Monteverdi's L'incoronazione di Poppea at Glyndebourne, and she returned to sing in many productions there in roles such as Concepción in L'heure espagnole. With Glyndebourne Touring Opera, she sang the role of Sashka in the 1987 world premiere of Nigel Osborne's The Electrification of the Soviet Union.

From 1988, she sang at other opera houses in the UK, including the Royal Opera House, Covent Garden, with roles in Parsifal, Jenůfa and The Knot Garden, and the English National Opera in The Makropulos Affair. Abroad, her roles have included Despina in Così fan tutte (Amsterdam, Stuttgart and Zurich), Zerlina in Don Giovanni (Seattle Opera, Stuttgart and Nancy), Governess in The Turn of the Screw (La Fenice), Jenny in Rise and Fall of the City of Mahagonny (Los Angeles Opera), the Composer in Ariadne auf Naxos (Opera Theatre of St. Louis), Concepción in L’Heure Espagnole (New York City Opera and Geneva), Serpetta in La finta giardiniera (Frankfurt and Lausanne), and Damigella in L'incoronazione di Poppea at the Salzburg Festival. She has sung many times with Nicolaus Harnoncourt and in 1991 recorded with him the role of Despina with the Concertgebouw Orchestra for the Teldec/Warner Classics label. She appeared at the 2024 Grange Park Opera festival as the Marquise of Berkenfield, "a model of haughty noblesse oblige, stern in voice and nature", in The Daughter of the Regiment.

=== Mid-1990s – present ===
In the mid-1990s Steiger began concentrating on the mezzo-soprano repertoire and went on to sing:

- Melanto in Il ritorno d'Ulisse in patria at the Brooklyn Academy of Music in New York with the Dutch National Opera (1993)
- Magdalene in Die Meistersinger von Nürnberg in Stuttgart (1994)
- Meg Page in Falstaff at the Dutch National Opera (1994, as part of the Holland Festival)
- Maddalena in Rigoletto at the Opéra de Monte-Carlo (1995)
- La libellule, La tasse chinoise, and Maman in L'enfant et les sortilèges at La Fenice (1996)
- Flora in La traviata at the Dutch National Opera (1997)
- Giunone in Agrippina in Palermo (1997)
- Dorothée in Massenet's Cendrillon in Geneva (1998)
- Marcellina in The Marriage of Figaro at Monte Carlo, Teatro Real in Madrid (1998) and at the Dutch National Opera (2001)
- Tisbe in La Cenerentola at the Opéra Bastille (1998), Marseilles and Geneva, and at the Opéra de Rennes (2015)
- Marquise in La fille du régiment in St Gallen (2000) and at the Opéra de Lausanne (2016)
- Baronessa in Il cappello di paglia di Firenze by Nino Rota in Toulouse (2000)
- Ragonde in Le comte Ory in Toulouse (2001) and Paris (2003)
- Auntie in Peter Grimes in Nancy, Toulouse, and Toronto (2003)
- Kunstgewerblerin in Lulu at the Opéra Bastille (2003)
- Alisa in Lucia di Lammermoor at the Dutch National Opera (2007)
- Pierrot Lunaire for the Opéra National de Montpellier (2009) and Australian Festival of Chamber Music (2015)
- La Cenerentola for the Opera de Rennes (2015)
- La fille du régiment for the Opéra de Lausanne (2016)
- La Traviata for Capitole de Toulouse (2018)
- Le Comte Ory (Ragonde) for Opera Rouen (2019)
- Bélize in Les Femmes Savantes by Molière at La Scala theatre in Paris (2019)

The Old Lady, Candide, Opera de Lausanne (2022)

Marquise de Berkenfield, Grange Park Opera (2024)

== Discography ==
- Bellini: Norma – Julian Reynolds conducting the Netherlands Chamber Orchestra, recorded live at Het Muziektheater, Amsterdam, 2005 (Anna Steiger as Clotilde). Label: Opus Arte (DVD)
- Mozart: Così fan tutte – Nikolaus Harnoncourt conducting the Royal Concertgebouw Orchestra, 1991 (Anna Steiger as Despina). Label: Teldec/Warner Classics (CD)
- Milhaud: Les malheurs d'Orphée – Robert Ziegler conducting the Matrix Ensemble, 1991 (Anna Steiger as Euridice). Label: AVS (CD)
- Ravel: L'heure espagnole – Simon Rattle conducting the London Philharmonic Orchestra, recorded live at Glyndebourne Festival Opera, 1987 (Anna Steiger as Concepción). Label: Kultur/Warner Classics (DVD)
