= The Prague Orgy =

1985 novella by Philip Roth

- First English edition (publ. Jonathan Cape)
- Author: Philip Roth
- Language: English
- Series: Zuckerman Bound trilogy
- Subject: Totalitarianism, Struggle of artists
- Genre: Novella
- Publisher: Farrar, Straus & Giroux (USA): Jonathan Cape (UK)
- Publication date: 1985
- Publication place: United States
- Media type: Print (Hardcover and Paperback)
- Preceded by: "The Anatomy Lesson"

The Prague Orgy (1985) is a novella by Philip Roth. The short book is the epilogue to his trilogy Zuckerman Bound, and was initially published in the USA in a single volume with the trilogy. It was first published in England as a separate volume.

The story follows Roth's alter ego Nathan Zuckerman, on a journey to Communist Prague in 1976 seeking the unpublished manuscripts of a Yiddish writer. The book, presented as journal entries by Zuckerman, details the struggle of demoralized artists in a totalitarian society.
