= Benedict (surname) =

Origin
- Language: Latin
- Meaning: "Blessed"

Other names
- Variant forms: Bennett, Benoit

Benedict is a patronymic surname, referring to the given name Benedict, which comes from the Latin word meaning "blessed". The name was popularized by Saint Benedict of Nursia, the founder of the Order of Saint Benedict and thereby of Western Monasticism (Benedictine).

== People with the surname Benedict ==
- Bertram Benedict (c. 1892–1978), American author and editor
- Brooks Benedict (1896–1968), American actor
- Bruce Benedict (born 1955), American baseball player, coach and scout
- Burton Benedict (1923–2010), American anthropologist
- Charles Benedict (disambiguation), multiple people
- Cleve Benedict (born 1935), American politician from West Virginia
- Clare Benedict (1870–1961), American author
- Clint Benedict (1892–1976), Canadian ice hockey player
- Dirk Benedict (pseudonym, born 1945), American actor
- Ed Benedict (1912–2006), American animator and layout artist
- Emma Lee Benedict (1857–1937), American editor, educator, author
- Erastus C. Benedict (1800–1880), American politician from New York
- George G. Benedict (1826–1907), American newspaper editor and Medal of Honor recipient from Vermont
- Hester A. Benedict (1838–1921), American poet and writer
- Heath Benedict (1983–2008), American football player
- Jacques Benedict (1879–1948), American architect
- Jim Benedict (born 1961), American baseball executive
- John Benedict (1649–1729), American politician from Connecticut
- Sir Julius Benedict (1804–1885), English composer and conductor
- Laura Watson Benedict (1861–1932), American anthropologist
- Moby Benedict (1935–2022), American baseball player and coach
- Nex Benedict (2008–2024), American non-binary student
- Paul Benedict (1938–2008), American actor
- Paul K. Benedict (1912–1997), American psychiatrist and linguist
- Pinckney Benedict (born 1964), American author
- Richard Benedict (1920–1984), Italian-born television and film actor and director
- Rob Benedict (born 1970), American actor
- Ruth Benedict (1887–1948), American anthropologist
- Ruth Sarles Benedict (1906–1996), American anti-war activist, researcher and journalist
- Stanley Rossiter Benedict (1884–1936), American chemist who invented Benedict's reagent, a test for reducing sugars
- Thomas Benedict (1617–1689), early settler in colonial New York, and Connecticut; member of the General Court of the Colony of Connecticut
- Thomas Benedict (II) (1682–1763), American politician from Connecticut
- William Benedict (1917–1999), actor

=== Fictional characters ===
- Eggs Benedict, a character in the Five Nights at Freddy's video game series
- Julius and Vincent Benedict, characters in Twins
- Phillium Benedict, villain of Recess: School's Out
- Terry Benedict, character in Ocean's Eleven
- Nicholas Benedict, character in The Mysterious Benedict Society
