= The Plot Against America =

2004 novel by Philip Roth

- Dust jacket of first U.S. edition
- Author: Philip Roth
- Language: English
- Genre: Alternative history
- Publisher: Houghton Mifflin
- Publication date: 2004
- Publication place: United States
- Pages: 400
- ISBN: 0-224-07453-9
- OCLC: 56804910

The Plot Against America is a novel by Philip Roth published in 2004. It is an alternative history in which Franklin D. Roosevelt is defeated in the presidential election of 1940 by Charles Lindbergh. The novel follows the fortunes of the Roth family during the Lindbergh presidency, as antisemitism becomes more acceptable in American life and Jewish-American families like the Roths are persecuted on various levels. The narrator and central character in the novel is the young Philip, and the novel follows his coming of age, as well as American politics.

Roth based his novel on the isolationist ideas espoused by Lindbergh in real life as a spokesman for the America First Committee, and on his own experiences growing up in Newark, New Jersey. The novel received praise for the realism of its world and its treatment of topics such as antisemitism, trauma, and the perception of history. The novel depicts the Weequahic section of Newark which includes Weequahic High School from which Roth graduated. A miniseries adaptation of the novel aired on HBO in March 2020.

== Plot ==
The novel is told from the point of view of Roth as a child growing up in Newark, New Jersey, as the younger son of Herman and Bess Roth. It begins with aviation hero Charles Lindbergh, who is already criticized for his praise of Hitler's government, joining the America First Party. As the party's spokesman, he speaks out against US intervention in World War II and openly criticizes the "Jewish race" for trying to force US involvement. After making a surprise appearance on the last night of the 1940 Republican National Convention, he is nominated as the Republican Party's candidate for president.

Although criticized from the left and feared by most Jewish Americans, Lindbergh musters a strong tide of popular support from the South and the Midwest and is endorsed by Conservative rabbi Lionel Bengelsdorf of Newark. Lindbergh wins the 1940 election over incumbent president Franklin Roosevelt in a landslide under the slogan "Vote for Lindbergh, or vote for war." Montana senator Burton K. Wheeler is Lindbergh's vice president, and Lindbergh nominates Henry Ford as Secretary of the Interior. With Lindbergh in the White House, the Roth family begins to feel like outsiders in American society.

Lindbergh's first act is to sign a treaty with Nazi Germany that promises that the United States will not interfere with German expansion in Europe, known as the "Iceland Understanding," and another with Imperial Japan that promises noninterference with Japanese expansion in Asia, known as the "Hawaii Understanding."

The new presidency begins to take a toll on Philip's family. Philip's cousin Alvin joins the Canadian Army to fight in Europe. Alvin loses his leg in combat and returns home with his ideals destroyed. He leaves the family and becomes a racketeer in Philadelphia. A new government program, the Office of American Absorption (OAA), begins to take Jewish boys to spend a period of time living with exchange families in the South and Midwest to "Americanize" them. Philip's older brother Sandy is one of the boys selected, and after spending time on a farm in Kentucky under the OAA's "Just Folks" program, he comes home showing contempt for his family, calling them "ghetto Jews."

Philip's aunt, Evelyn Finkel, marries Rabbi Bengelsdorf and becomes a frequent guest of the Lindbergh White House. Her attendance of a state dinner party for German Foreign Minister Joachim Von Ribbentrop causes further strain in the family. A new version of the Homestead Act of 1862, called Homestead 42, is instituted to relocate entire Jewish families to the Western and Southern United States by mandating companies to relocate positions to those regions. Many of Philip's Newark neighbors move to Canada. Philip visits Evelyn, a senior OAA administrator, in order to try and prevent his family from having to leave Newark, but this results in Philip's shy and innocent school friend, Seldon Wishnow, an only child, and his widowed mother, Selma, being moved to tiny Danville, Kentucky. Herman quits his job selling insurance and starts working for his brother in order for his family to avoid relocation.

In protest against the new act, the radio personality Walter Winchell openly criticizes the Lindbergh administration on his nationwide Sunday night broadcast from New York. He is fired by his sponsor. Winchell then decides to run for president in 1942 and begins a speaking tour. His candidacy causes anger and antisemitic rioting in the South and the Midwest. Mobs begin targeting him. While addressing an open-air political rally in Louisville, Kentucky, on October 5, 1942, Winchell is assassinated. His funeral in New York City is presided over by Mayor Fiorello La Guardia, who praises Winchell for his opposition to fascism and pointedly criticizes Lindbergh for his silence over the riots and Winchell's assassination.

As President Lindbergh is returning from delivering a speech in Louisville on October 7, 1942, his plane goes missing. Ground searches produce no results, and Vice President Wheeler assumes the presidency. German State Radio discloses "evidence" that Lindbergh's disappearance and the kidnapping of his son were part of a Jewish conspiracy to take control of the US government. The announcement incites further antisemitic rioting. Wheeler and Ford, acting on the Nazis' evidence, begin arresting prominent Jewish citizens, including Henry Morgenthau Jr., Herbert Lehman, and Bernard Baruch as well as Mayor La Guardia and Rabbi Bengelsdorf.

Seldon calls the Roths when his mother does not come home from work. They later discover that Seldon's mother was killed by Ku Klux Klan members who beat and robbed her before setting fire to her car with her in it. The Roths eventually call Sandy's exchange family in Kentucky and have them keep Seldon safe until Philip's father and brother retrieve him. Months later, Seldon is taken in by his mother's sister. The rioting stops when First Lady Anne Morrow Lindbergh makes a statement that asks for the country to stop the violence and move forward. With the end of the search for President Lindbergh, former president Roosevelt runs as an emergency bipartisan presidential candidate in November 1942 and is re-elected. Months later, the Japanese attack Pearl Harbor, and the US enters the war.

Aunt Evelyn recounts a theory of Lindbergh's disappearance, the source for which is First Lady Lindbergh, who disclosed the details to Evelyn's husband, Rabbi Bengelsdorf, shortly before she was forcibly removed from the White House and held prisoner in the psychiatric ward at Walter Reed Army Hospital. According to Evelyn, after the Lindberghs' son, Charles, was kidnapped in 1932, his murder was faked, and he was then raised in Germany by the Nazis as a Hitler Youth member. The Nazis' price for the boy's life was Lindbergh's full co-operation with a Nazi-organized presidential campaign by which they hoped to bring the Final Solution to the US. When Lindbergh informed them that the US would never permit such a thing, he was kidnapped, and the Jewish conspiracy theory was put forward in hopes of turning the US further against its Jewish population. Philip admits that Evelyn's theory is the most far-fetched and "unbelievable" explanation for Lindbergh's disappearance, but "not necessarily the least convincing."

== Inspiration ==
Roth got the idea for the novel while reading Arthur Schlesinger Jr.'s memoir, which comments that in 1940 some Republican senators wanted Lindbergh to run against Roosevelt. The real-life Lindbergh's 1941 Des Moines speech—in which he accused American Jews of manipulating the news media and government to make the country join World War II—appears reprinted in the novel's postscript.

The novel depicts an antisemitic United States in the 1940s. Roth had written in his autobiography, The Facts, of the racial and antisemitic tensions that were a part of his childhood in Newark. Several times in that book, he describes children in his neighborhood being violently attacked simply because they were Jewish.

== Reception ==
Jonathan Yardley of The Washington Post, exploring the book's treatment of Lindbergh in some depth, calls the book "painfully moving" and a "genuinely American story."

The New York Times review described the book as "a terrific political novel" as well as "sinister, vivid, dreamlike, preposterous and, at the same time, creepily plausible."

Blake Morrison in The Guardian offered high praise: "The Plot Against America creates its reality magisterially, in long, fluid sentences that carry you beyond skepticism and with a quotidian attentiveness to sights and sounds, tastes and smells, surnames and nicknames and brandnames—an accumulation of petits faits vrais—that dissolves any residual disbelief."

Writer Bill Kauffman, in The American Conservative, wrote a scathing review of the book and objected to its criticism of the movement of which Lindbergh was a chief spokesperson, which is sometimes referred to as isolationist but Kauffman sees as antiwar, in contrast to Roosevelt's pro-war stance. He also criticizes its portrayal of increasing American antisemitism, in particular among Catholics, and for the nature of its fictional portrayals of real-life characters like Lindbergh, claiming it was "bigoted and libellous of the dead," as well as for its ending, featuring a resolution to the political situation that Kauffman considered a deus ex machina.

The book was also reviewed for The Economist. The reviewer wrote that the novel explores what happens to one (Jewish) family when America gradually rescinds its welcome to immigrants and minorities such as the Jews. He critically noted that "the book's historical aspects can seem thin and preposterous" but praised it for its "the description of how history can encroach upon an ordinary family, and how simple survival becomes an instance of heroism".

The Telegraph noted that the novel invites to draw parallels to the George W. Bush administration and its policies, but Roth denied such allegorical interpretations of his novel.

In 2005, the novel won the James Fenimore Cooper Prize for Best Historical Fiction given by the Society of American Historians. It won the Sidewise Award for Alternate History, was a finalist for the John W. Campbell Memorial Award, and came in 11th for the 2005 Locus Awards. In 2019, The Guardian ranked it at no. 12 on their list of the 100 best books of the 21st century. In 2024, it was ranked #65 in the New York Times list of best 100 novels of the 21st century.

== Analysis ==
=== Antisemitism ===
The similarities between modern anti-Zionism in western countries and the antisemitic policy decisions of the 20th-century Lindbergh government in the novel are highlighted by Jewish writer Mike Berger. Berger discusses how in both situations, the targeting and ostracization of the Jewish population is masked in government and high society by making the criticism of Jewish people appear reasonable in focusing on their isolation and failure to assimilate with the majority white culture. From this implicit condoning of prejudice against Jewish communities, many antisemitic individuals and groups become emboldened to carry out acts of violence and discriminate against Jews, as seen in the novel.

English Professor T. Austin Graham argues that the gradual escalation of antisemitic government policy carries a lingering, dreadful possibility of full-scale holocaust across the novel. He argues that the novel also shows how many Jewish families like the Roths are also severely affected by the major shift in the “collective American psyche” that leads to wide-scale rioting akin to the events of Kristallnacht in Nazi Germany.

=== Identity ===
Mike Berger asserts that Roth captures the “essence” of Jewish identity in the novel with lines that describe the characters’ identities as being “as fundamental as having arteries and veins,'' contributing to an understanding of a “deep” identity as being the total merging of the individual and the collective.

=== Trauma ===
The issue of trauma on a personal and group level is an important theme of the novel, which professor Aimee Pozorski believes is demonstrated by Roth's use of skewed time—“a kind of traumatic time that conflates the present moment with an unassimilated past”—to create the sense that the novel is a relived experience of a past trauma that may be able to offer new insights on the experience. Pozorski states that the novel juxtaposes America's founding with the reality of its founding principles being torn apart to tell a reimagined Holocaust narrative.

The novel's use of a child character as the principal point of view and the filtering of the novel's horrific events through the child's lens also highlights how future generations are more heavily impacted by traumatic events. Such an impact could dramatically reshape personal and cultural identities.

=== Historiography ===
Professor Jason Siegel claims that Roth wrote The Plot Against America in order to challenge the linear perception of history. Rather than a single, objectively told narrative where every event serves a purpose, Roth proposes that historiography is characterized by the competition between conflicting “plots” and narratives aiming to forward agendas that suit the interests of those dealing with unresolved conflict in the present. He does this by depicting how the battle between two alleged plots—the Jewish and fascist plots to take over the United States—shapes the course of the nation's future and impacts the perspective and experience of different social groups in different ways. Roth redefines historical truth as the multiplicity of experiences and narratives of all people, and cautions that American history “remains perpetually unwritten and myriad."

=== Parallels to the 2016 Presidential election ===
After the 2016 election of Donald Trump to the US presidency, reviewers noted the presence in The Plot Against America of a character who bears a resemblance to Trump. The cousin, Alvin, goes to work for a Jewish real-estate developer whose description closely matches Trump. Roth was interviewed in The New Yorker about similarities between his novel and the election of Trump. Roth responded, "It is easier to comprehend the election of an imaginary President like Charles Lindbergh than an actual President like Donald Trump. Lindbergh, despite his Nazi sympathies and racist proclivities, was a great aviation hero ... Trump is just a con artist."

== Historical figures ==
The Plot Against America depicts or mentions many historical figures:

- Fiorello H. La Guardia: The mayor of New York City from 1934 to 1945. In the novel, La Guardia gives a speech to the people of New York during the funeral of Walter Winchell in which he denounces the administration's silence on the epidemic of antisemitic rioting and warns against the rise of fascism in the United States by proclaiming "it is happening here!" He is later arrested for allegedly being a part of the conspiracy to assassinate President Lindbergh and is released when the Wheeler Administration backs down.
- Charles A. Lindbergh: A famous American aviator who at the last minute wins the Republican Party nomination and defeats Franklin D. Roosevelt to become the 33rd president of the United States. His anti-war platform and antisemitic views lead to the signing of peace agreements with the Axis powers and the increasing marginalization of Jewish Americans. Historically, Lindbergh was an outspoken leader of the America First committee of isolationists and accused Roosevelt and American Jews of being agitators for war. He also made frequent trips to Nazi Germany and was criticized in American media for his antisemitic remarks and his praise of the Nazi regime, including his description of Adolf Hitler as “the world’s greatest safeguard against the spread of communism and its evils."
- Anne Morrow Lindbergh: The wife of Charles Lindbergh who in the novel brings an end to the civil unrest and political crackdown brought about by her husband's disappearance with an appeal to her countrymen via radio address. The real-world kidnapping and murder of her three-year-old son is the subject of several conspiracies in the plot of the novel, with several characters accusing either the Jews or the Nazis of being behind the crime.
- Franklin D. Roosevelt: The 32nd president of the United States, Roosevelt loses reelection in 1940 to Charles Lindbergh instead of winning against Wendell Willkie as he did in real history. Lindbergh and Roosevelt did hold some animosity for each other in real life, with the president likening the aviator to the “Copperheads” that opposed the Union's military intervention in the secession crisis during the Civil War and barring him from joining the Army Air Force after Pearl Harbor. The novel ends with Roosevelt winning an emergency election for president and restoring history to its real course by entering into World War II on the side of the Allies after the Japanese attack on Pearl Harbor.
- Burton K. Wheeler: A Democratic senator who becomes Lindbergh's running mate and is elected Vice President of the United States. When Lindbergh disappears in the novel, Wheeler's administration propagates a conspiracy theory blaming the Jewish community for the disappearance of Lindbergh and the kidnapping of his son several years prior and begins arresting prominent Jewish figures and members of the opposition. The historical Wheeler was a staunch isolationist and supporter of the America First Committee, who was accused of antisemitism in a political pamphlet also entitled The Plot Against America. The veracity of these accusations is disputed by historians.
- Walter Winchell: A famous Jewish gossip columnist and radio broadcaster from New York City who, in the novel and in real life, was a fierce critic of Charles Lindbergh. His candidacy for the 1944 presidential election against President Lindbergh is cut short when he is assassinated at a rally in Louisville, Kentucky, exacerbating riots and antisemitic violence across the nation.

== Television adaptation ==
On January 18, 2018, it was reported that The Wire creator David Simon would adapt a six-part mini-series adaptation of The Plot Against America. The news was first announced in New York Times journalist Charles McGrath's interview with Roth, who noted that Simon had visited Roth, who stated he "was sure his novel was in good hands." Filming took place in Jersey City, New Jersey. It premiered on HBO on March 16, 2020.

== See also ==
- Business Plot
- Hypothetical Axis victory in World War II: an extensive list of Wikipedia articles regarding works of Nazi Germany/Axis/World War II alternative history.
- It Can't Happen Here: 1935 novel by Sinclair Lewis in which a demagogue defeats Franklin D. Roosevelt in 1936 and establishes totalitarian rule.

== Sources ==
- Bresnan, Mark. "America First: Reading The Plot Against America in the Age of Trump." The Los Angeles Review of Books. September 11, 2016.
- Kalisch, Michael (Spring 2022). "Philip Roth's Radio Novels: Tuning in to I Married a Communist and The Plot Against America". Studies in American Fiction. 49 (1): 71–97. doi:10.1353/saf.2022.0003.
- Kellman, Steven G. (Fall 2008). "It Is Happening Here: The Plot Against America and the Political Moment". Philip Roth Studies. 4 (2): 113–123. doi:10.1353/prs.2008.a386459. JSTOR 10.5703/philrothstud.4.2.113.
- Rossi, Umberto. "Philip Roth: Complotto contro l'America o complotto americano?", Pulp Libri #54 (March–April 2005), 4–7.
- Swirski, Peter. "It Can't Happen Here or Politics, Emotions, and Philip Roth's The Plot Against America." American Utopia and Social Engineering in Literature, Social Thought, and Political History. New York, Routledge, 2011.
- Stinson, John J. "'I Declare War': A New Street Game and New Grim Realities in Roth's The Plot Against America." ANQ: A Quarterly Journal of Short Articles, Notes and Reviews #22.1 (2009), 42–48.
