= The Good Deed =

The Good Deed may refer to:

== Television ==
- "The Good Deed", a 1959 The David Niven Show episode
- "The Good Deed", a 2013 Wander Over Yonder episode
- "The Good Deed", a 2022 Beavis and Butt-Head episode

== Literature ==
- "The Good Deed", a 1969 short story by Pearl S. Buck
- "The Good Deed", a short story by Richard Laymon
- The Good Deed, a 2024 novel by Helen Benedict

== Other uses ==
- Good works, the Christian doctrine of acts and deeds of good will
- The good deed, a component of the scout method
- Good Deeds, a 2012 film by Tyler Perry
