= Des Moines speech =

1941 speech by Charles Lindbergh

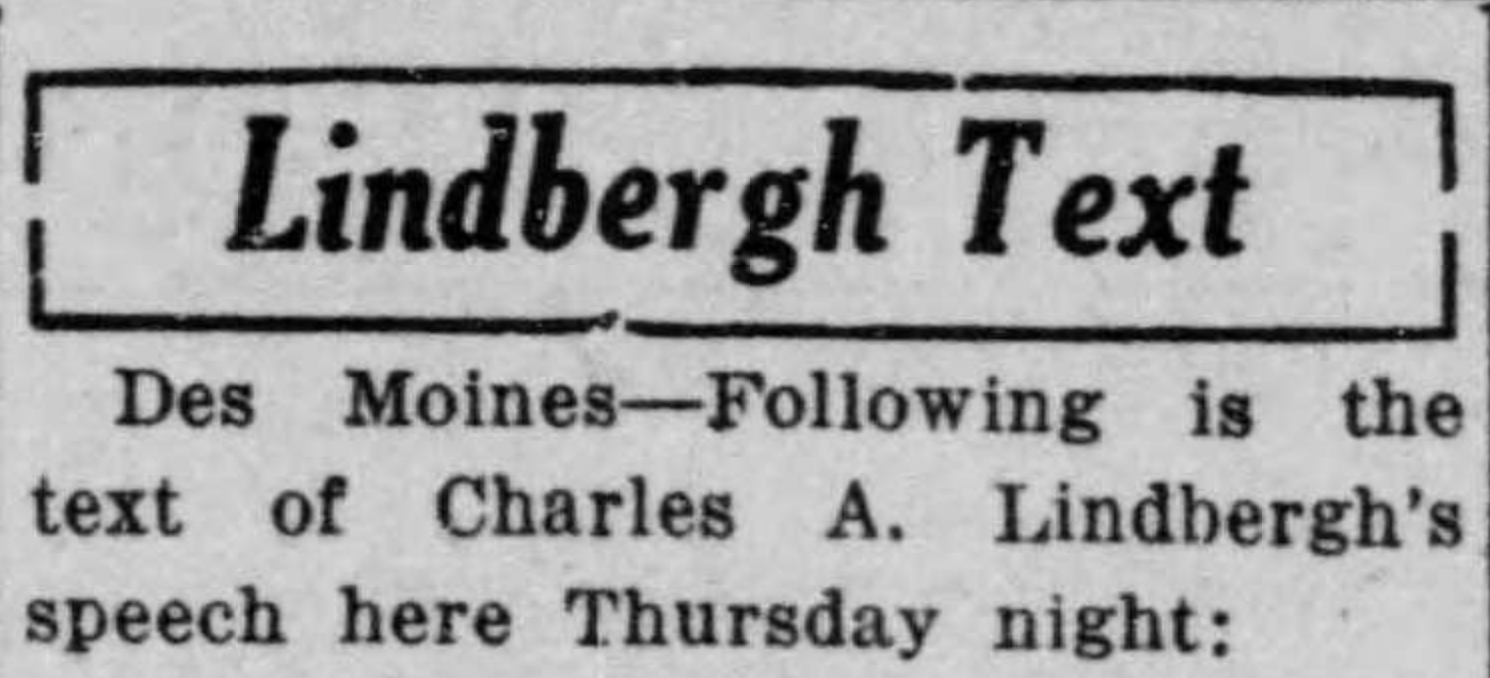
- The Burlington Daily Hawk Eye Gazette reporting on the speech, September 12, 1941
- Date: September 11, 1941
- Duration: 25 minutes
- Venue: Des Moines Coliseum
- Location: Des Moines, Iowa, U.S.
- Participants: Charles Lindbergh

The Des Moines speech, formally titled "Who Are the War Agitators?", was an isolationist and antisemitic speech that American aviator Charles Lindbergh delivered at a 1941 America First Committee rally held in Des Moines, Iowa. In the speech, Lindbergh argued that participation in World War II was not in the United States' interest, and he accused three groups of trying to push the country toward war: the British, who, he said, were propagandizing the United States; Jews, whom Lindbergh accused of exercising outsized influence and of controlling the American news media; and the Roosevelt administration, who, he said, wanted to use a war to consolidate power. Called Lindbergh's "most controversial public speech", his use of antisemitic tropes and monolithic characterization of American Jews as war-agitating outsiders prompted a nationwide backlash against him and America First that the organization "never recovered from".

== Background ==
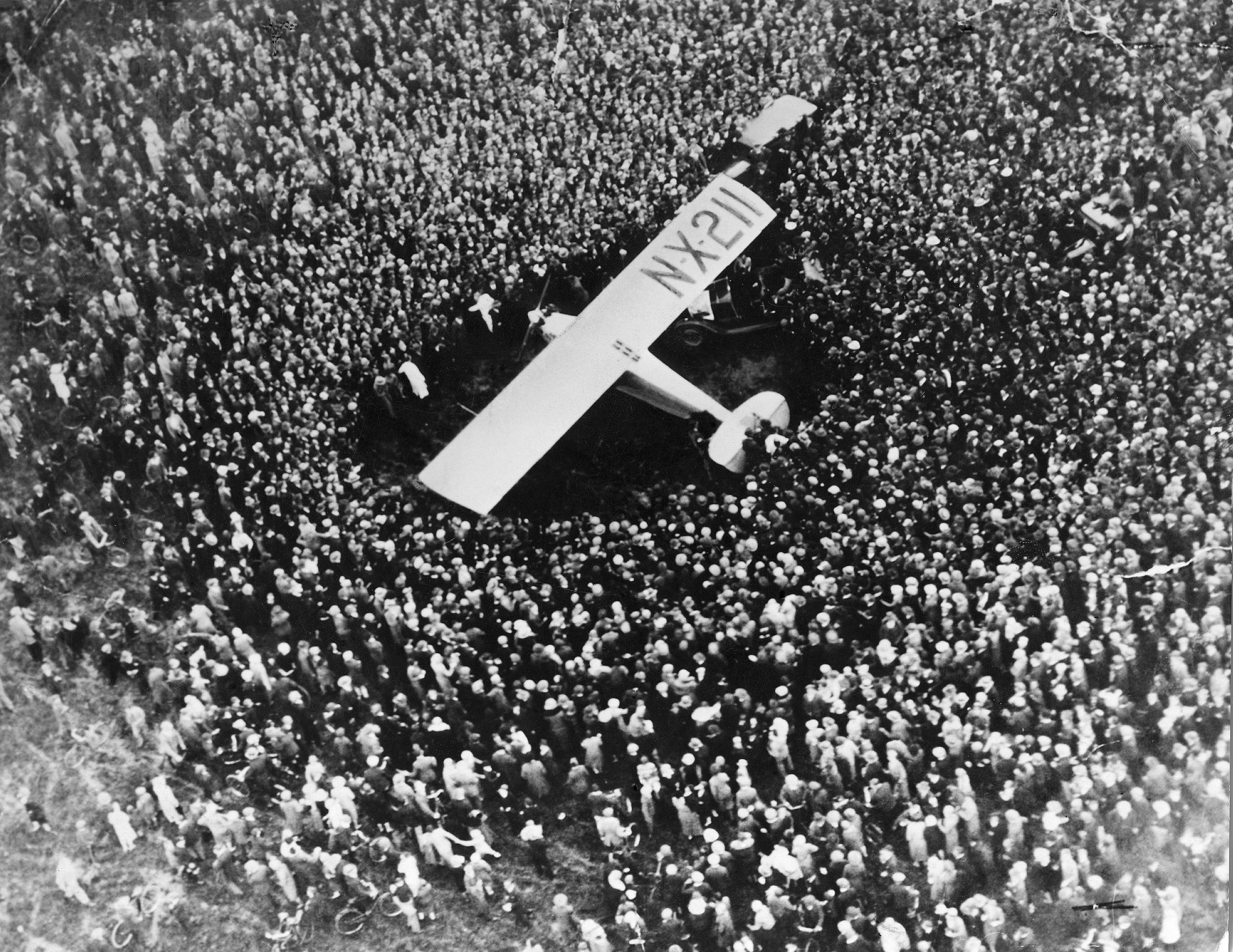
A crowd greeting Charles Lindbergh in England in 1927

After completing the first nonstop solo flight across the Atlantic Ocean in 1927, American aviator Charles Lindbergh became an internationally famous and admired public figure. He was the first ever Time Person of the Year. An advocate for aviation, Lindbergh was interested in the military airpower of various European nations; he personally considered the Royal Air Force deficient and Luftwaffe impressive in that regard. In 1937, Lindbergh praised German aviation as being, in his words, "without parallel", and he thought Germany had a "sense of decency and value [...] far ahead of" those of America. When the Embassy of the United States, Berlin hosted a dinner with Lindbergh and Hermann Göring (the head of the Luftwaffe and second most powerful man in Nazi Germany after Adolf Hitler) in attendance as guests of honor on October 8, 1938, Göring awarded Lindbergh the Service Cross of the Order of the German Eagle with the Star, which Lindbergh accepted.

In the summer of 1940, Lindbergh wrote in his diary that he believed American society was deteriorating, lamenting that Americans, according to him, "lack[ed] understanding of, or interest in, fundamental problems" and that there were, in his view, too many Jewish people in the United States, for "too many create chaos", Lindbergh believed. Members of the Roosevelt administration, including President Franklin D. Roosevelt himself, privately concluded that Lindbergh was sympathetic to Nazism.

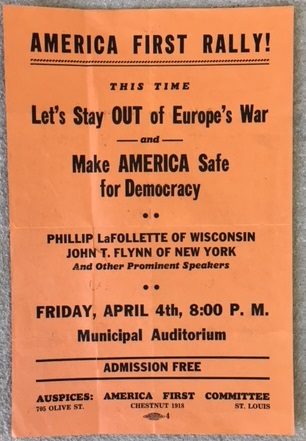
A handbill for an America First Committee event

Between 1939 and 1941, there was public disagreement in the United States about whether or not the country should enter the then ongoing Second World War. Lindbergh strongly opposed America involvement in the war. He believed the United States would lose in a European war with Germany, and in June 1940 predicted a German victory over Britain. In 1941, Lindbergh became a member of the national committee for the America First Committee, an isolationist advocacy group that lobbied against America entering World War II and over the course of its existence increasingly adopted nativism and antisemitism.

Lindbergh gave speeches at thirteen rallies held by America First. Lindbergh's speeches were broadcast over radio and excited audiences, who wrote to him with praises—such as for his rhetorical appeal to reason and calming voice—and according to historian David Goodman, he was "the most popular and charismatic orator" in the public debate about intervention. Beginning in 1941, Lindbergh made several public criticisms of president Franklin D. Roosevelt and his administration, accusing Roosevelt of ignoring the will of the American people, deceiving the public, and "advocat[ing] world domination".

== Development ==
By September 1941, Lindbergh thought the United States was on the brink of entering World War II, and he decided he wanted to give a speech identifying those who he believed were "responsible for pushing" the country to join the war. In previous speeches, Lindbergh had referred vaguely to what he called "powerful elements" in favor of interventionism without specifically naming or identifying them. Preparing for a scheduled address at an America First rally to be held in Des Moines, Iowa, Lindbergh wrote several drafts of a speech he initially titled "Who Are the Interventionists?" before retitling it "Who Are the War Agitators?". Anne Morrow Lindbergh, married to Charles Lindbergh, encouraged him to put more emotion into his public speaking in general, but he dissembled from practicing, disliking rehearsal because he thought, in his words, that he "seem[ed] to lose spirit and feeling in the second reading".

When Anne Lindbergh read Charles Lindbergh's "Who Are the War Agitators?", she was alarmed and warned him against delivering the speech as written, as she predicted the press would consider the speech and him antisemitic. Lindbergh insisted that he intended no antisemitism and refused to revise the speech to alleviate Anne's concern, getting into what she called a "terrible row" with her. In a conversation with poet Selden Rodman a few weeks before giving the speech, Charles Lindbergh said he believed Jewish people had "themselves to blame".

== Speech ==
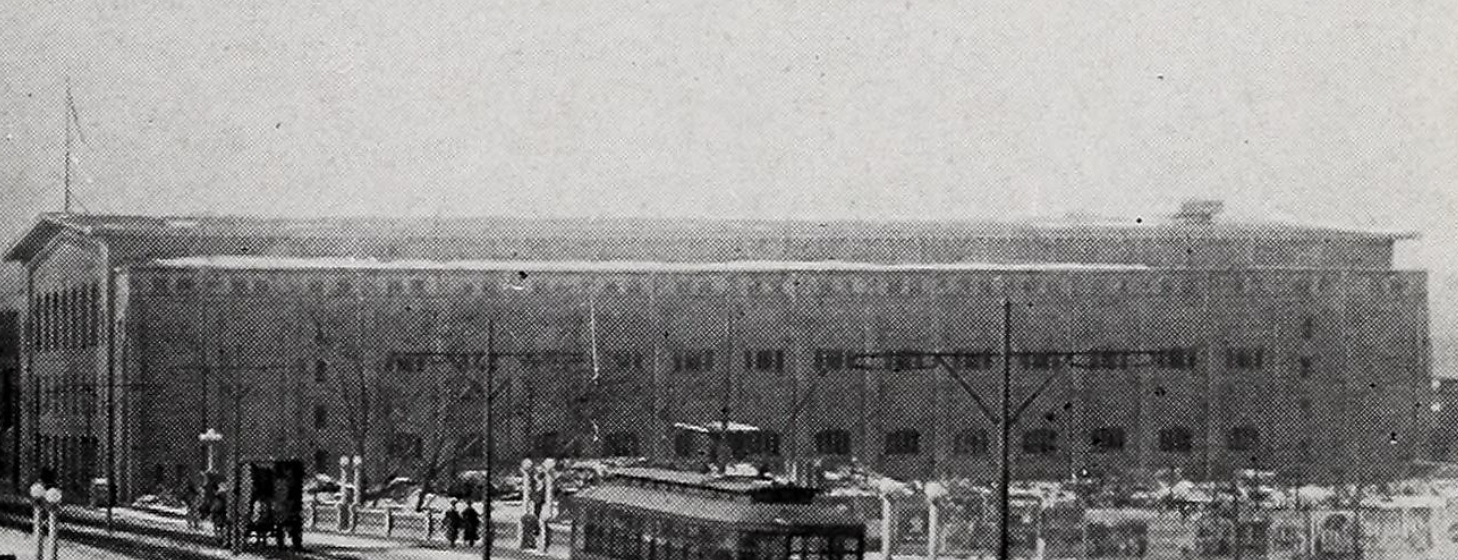
Des Moines Coliseum, c. 1911

Lindbergh delivered "Who Are the War Agitators?" at an America First rally held in the Des Moines Coliseum in Des Moines, Iowa, on September 11, 1941. Eight thousand people attended in person, and it was broadcast by radio to a national audience. When Lindbergh got on stage with others from the America First Committee, members of the crowd variously applauded and booed. After a few other speakers preceded him, Lindbergh spoke, and his remarks lasted 25 minutes. He began by saying that there was an "ever-increasing effort to force the United States into" World War II and that he would identify groups who he thought were "responsible for changing our national policy" to favor participation in the war.

Six minutes into the speech, Lindbergh named those he considered war agitators: "the British, the Jewish, and the Roosevelt Administration", adding that he considered "capitalists, anglophiles, and intellectuals" and "[c]ommunistic groups" to also be agitators but of "lesser importance". In the address, Lindbergh said Britain was propagandizing the United States to "get us into the war" because, he averred, it was impossible for Britain to win without American assistance; while it was "perfectly understandable that Great Britain wants the United States in the war on her side", according to Lindbergh "our interest is first in America".

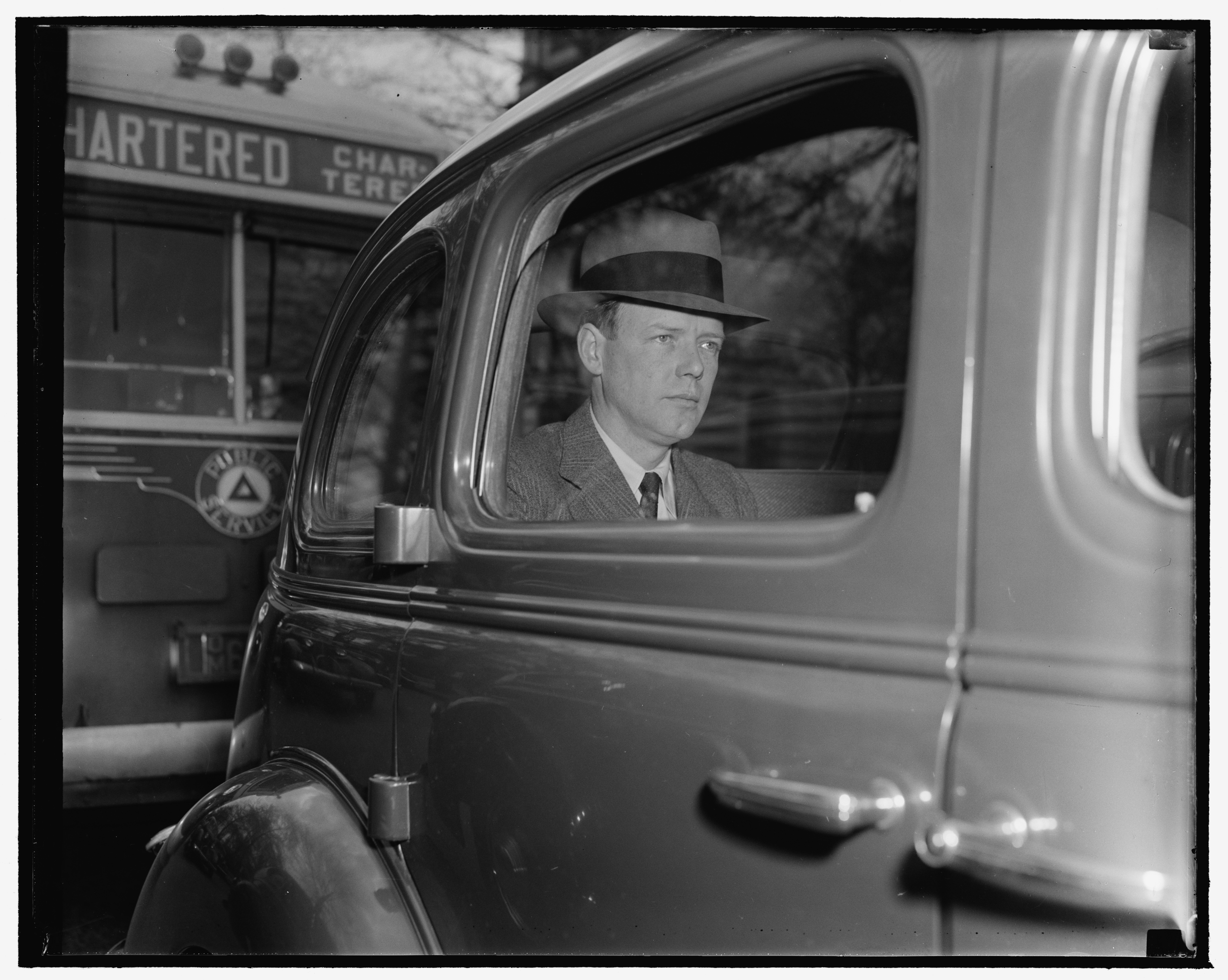
Charles Lindbergh in 1939

Lindbergh's accusations of Jewish war agitation comprised three paragraphs in the speech and formed what biographer A. Scott Berg called the "core of [Lindbergh's] thesis". The speech used conspiratorial antisemitic tropes about Jewish influence permeating the United States. Lindbergh said that American Jews had "large ownership and influence in our motion pictures, our press, our radio and our government". Accusations like those in Lindbergh's speech were recognizable in the United States at the time as antisemitic stereotypes codified by the hoax document The Protocols of the Elders of Zion. In reality, only a minority of interventionist organizations' members were Jews, less than 3% of publishers of newspapers in the United States were Jewish, and there were few Jews in the foreign policy bureaucracy. Many Jewish Americans, even if they hoped the United States went to war against Germany, deliberately avoided activism for war intervention out of fear of antisemitic backlash.

Lindbergh said he could "understand why Jewish people would desire the overthrow of Nazi Germany" and that "[n]o person with a sense of the dignity of mankind can condone" the persecution of Jews in Germany, but he insisted that entering World War II would endanger the country. In saying that "the British and the Jewish races", in his words, "for reasons which are not American, wish to involve us in the war", Lindbergh's antisemitic address characterized Jews as foreigners, outsiders, and infiltrators who were different from and dangerous to Americans.

Lindbergh accused the Roosevelt administration of wanting America to go to war as a bid for further power, consolidating control by artificial "maintenance of a wartime emergency". According to Lindbergh, Roosevelt had carried out "dictatorial procedures" and deceived the public. The United States Congress, Lindbergh said, was the "last stronghold of democracy and representative government in this country". According to Lindbergh's speech, only by their combined effort had the British, the Jews, and the Roosevelt administration brought the United States so close to war, and "[i]f any one of these groups" did not "agitat[e] for war", then he was sure the country would not enter World War II.

== Reception ==
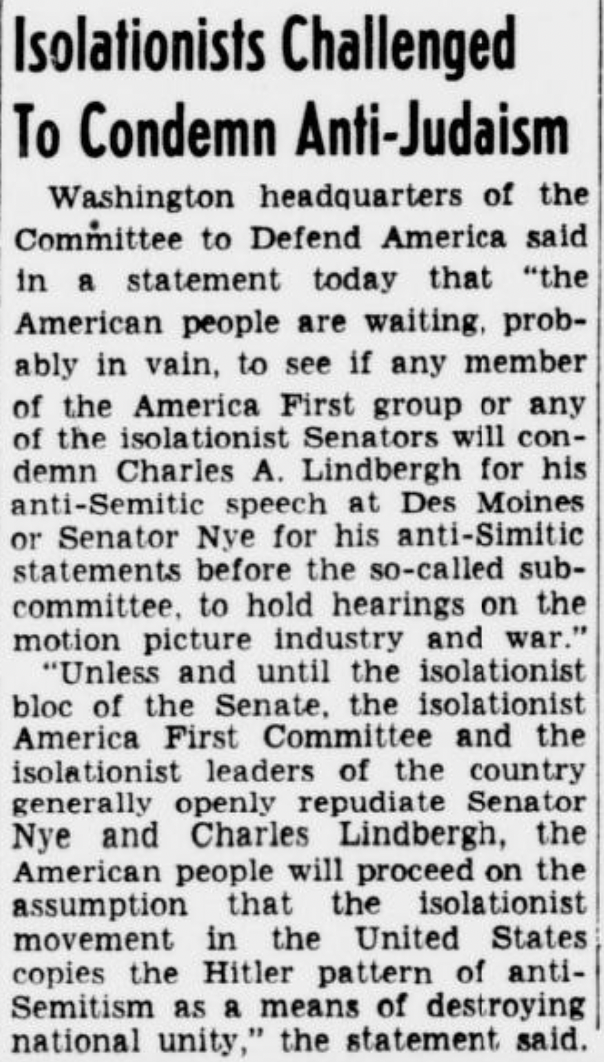
The Evening Star (September 16, 1941) reporting on criticism of the Des Moines speech

=== Reaction ===
Historian David Goodman called the Des Moines speech Lindbergh's "most controversial public speech". During the rally, Lindbergh received both booing and applause from the audience, and historian Susan Dunn wrote that when Lindbergh accused Jewish people of controlling the news media and government, "booing drowned out the cheers, forcing him again and again to stop" and "wait out the catcalls". According to historian Lynne Olson, "applause clearly outweighed the jeering". In his diary, Lindbergh called the audience "the most unfriendly crowd of any meeting to date, by far".

The general public overall received the speech poorly. Newspapers and politicians throughout the United States blasted Lindbergh's address as un-American. Jewish, Protestant, and Catholic organizations and clergy denounced the speech for its bigotry; theologian Reinhold Niebuhr urged America First to "clean its ranks of those who would incite to racial and religious strife", and the American Jewish Year Book wrote that Lindbergh had platformed an "ugly, hate-breeding lie". On September 16, 1941, the Davenport Times of Iowa reported that no other "public utterance by a figure of prominence in American life in a generation [...] brought forth such unanimous protest from the press, the church and political leaders". In October 1941, Gallup published a poll of Americans asking who was "trying to get us into a war", and only 7% of respondents said Jews.

Interventionists, noninterventionists, Democrats, Republicans, and Communists alike criticized Lindbergh, saying that the speech suggested he was antisemitic and sympathized with Adolf Hitler, the leader of Nazi Germany. Another isolationist organization, the Keep America Out of War Congress, had been collaborating with the America First Committee but ended that partnership after Lindbergh's Des Moines speech. Public intellectual Arthur M. Schlesinger Jr. heard Lindbergh's speech over the radio and in his memoir remembered finding it "all rather scary".

The America First Committee received mail both praising and condemning Lindbergh for his speech. 85% of the mail that America First received in the wake of the speech expressed solidarity with Lindbergh. A portion of those pro-Lindbergh letters also expressed virulent bigotry against Jews, and the speech emboldened some antisemitic Americans. Charles Coughlin, Merwin K. Hart, Herbert Hoover, and Alf Landon spoke in defense of Lindbergh, though their support, according to biographer Berg, "harmed more than they helped". On September 24, 1941, the America First Committee issued an official statement denying charges of antisemitism and accusing interventionists of "inject[ing] the race issue into the discussion". Numerous members and leaders of America First resigned in the aftermath of Lindbergh's speech while fascists and supporters of Hitler signed up to join in their place. Dunn concluded that the organization "never recovered from the calamity of Lindbergh's stop in Des Moines".

=== Depiction ===
Schlesinger's memoir, which mentioned that in 1940 some Republicans had wanted Lindbergh to run for president against Roosevelt, partly inspired novelist Philip Roth's 2004 The Plot Against America, an alternate history novel in which Lindbergh runs in and wins the 1940 United States presidential election. As president, the character Lindbergh institutes antisemitic policies relocating American Jews, and his real-life Des Moines speech is reprinted in a postscript. In the novel's plot, Roth moves the date of the Des Moines speech from 1941 to early 1940 (and thus before the 1940 Republican National Convention). When narrating the speech, Roth describes Lindbergh's voice as "high-pitched, flat, midwestern, decidedly un-Rooseveltian".

Many book reviews of The Plot Against America interpreted its alternate history of the 1940s as a veiled metaphor for the presidency of George W. Bush, whom reviewers said had, like Roth's president Lindbergh, cast a pall of fear over the country, though Lindbergh's isolationism differed from George W. Bush's overseas adventurism. Jewish studies professor Allan Arkush criticized The Plot Against America, as well as its HBO-produced miniseries adaptation of the same name, for implying that "an openly antisemitic candidate could have won the presidency in 1940", doubting the premise (though complimenting the execution) on the basis that in reality the Des Moines speech faced severe public backlash.

== Bibliography ==
- Arkush, Allan (May 12, 2020). "Could It Have Happened Here? The Implausible Plotting of The Plot Against America". Jewish Review of Books.
- Berg, A. Scott (1998). Lindbergh. Berkley Books. ISBN 978-0-425-17041-0.
- Cole, Wayne S. (Winter 1951). "The America First Committee". Journal of the Illinois State Historical Society. 44 (4): 305–322. JSTOR 40189171.
- Cole, Wayne S. (1974). Charles A. Lindbergh and the Battle Against American Intervention in World War II. Harcourt Brace Jovanovich. ISBN 0-15-118168-3.
- Dunn, Susan (2013). 1940: FDR, Willkie, Lindbergh, Hitler—the Election amid the Storm. Yale University Press. ISBN 9780300205749.
- Frankel, Richard (July 2013). "One Crisis Behind?: Rethinking Antisemitic Exceptionalism in the United States and Germany". American Jewish History. 97 (3): 235–258. doi:10.1353/ajh.2013.0020. JSTOR 23887618.
- Goodman, David (October 2008). "Pittsburgh 1941: War, Race, Biography, and History". Pennsylvania Magazine of History and Biography. 132 (4): 341–375. JSTOR 40543377.
- Goodman, David (2017). "Lindbergh's Voice". In Damousi, Joy; Hamilton, Paula (eds.). A Cultural History of Sound, Memory, and the Senses. Routledge Studies in Cultural History. Routledge. pp. 56–70. doi:10.4324/9781315445328. ISBN 978-1-138-21177-3.
- Greenwald, Lillian (1942). "Inter-group Relations". In Schneiderman, Harry; Fine, Morris T. (eds.). The American Jewish Year Book. Vol. 44. Jewish Publication Society of America. pp. 151–165. JSTOR 23602592.
- Hart, Bradley W. (2018). Hitler's American Friends: The Third Reich's Supporters in the United States. Thomas Dunne Books. ISBN 978-1-250-14895-7.
- Kalisch, Michael (Spring 2022). "Philip Roth's Radio Novels: Tuning in to I Married a Communist and The Plot Against America". Studies in American Fiction. 49 (1): 71–97. doi:10.1353/saf.2022.0003.
- Kellman, Steven G. (Fall 2008). "It Is Happening Here: The Plot Against America and the Political Moment". Philip Roth Studies. 4 (2): 113–123. doi:10.1353/prs.2008.a386459. JSTOR 10.5703/philrothstud.4.2.113.
- Olson, Lynne (2013). Those Angry Days: Roosevelt, Lindbergh, and America's Fight Over World War II, 1939–1941. Random House. ISBN 978-1-4000-6974-3.
- Sparrow, Paul M. (2024). Awakening the Spirit of America: FDR's War of Words With Charles Lindbergh—and the Battle to Save Democracy. Pegasus Books. ISBN 9781639366675.
- Specter, Matthew; Venkatasubramanian, Varsha (2023). "'America First': Nationalism, Nativism, and the Fascism Question, 1880–2020". In Rosenfeld, Gavriel D.; Ward, Janet (eds.). Fascism in America: Past and Present. Cambridge University Press. pp. 107–137. doi:10.1017/9781009337427.005. ISBN 978-1-009-33741-0.
- Valbousquet, Nina (January–April 2021). "'Un-American' Antisemitism?: The American Jewish Committee's Response to Global Antisemitism in the Interwar Period". American Jewish History. 105 (1–2): 77–102. doi:10.1353/ajh.2021.0004.
