= Laura Watson Benedict =

American anthropologist 1861–1932

- Born: May 5, 1861; Delhi, New York
- Died: December 13, 1932 (aged 71); Philadelphia, Pennsylvania
- Education: University of Chicago, BA, MA; Columbia University, PhD
- Scientific career
- Fields: Anthropology
- Thesis: Study of Bagobo Ceremonial, Magic and Myth (1916)
- Doctoral advisor: Franz Boas

Laura Watson Benedict (May 5, 1861 – December 13, 1932) was an American anthropologist who went to the Philippines and wrote about what she termed the Bagobo people (a category that is now considered to belong to three language subgroups - the Tagabawa, Guiangan and Obo) after living among them for about fourteen months from October 1906 to December 1907. She was the first American woman to obtain a doctoral degree in anthropology from Columbia University.

== Early life and education ==
Laura Estelle Watson Benedict was born on May 5, 1861 in Delhi, New York, the third child of Episcopalian minister Andrew Dibble Benedict. She studied at the Lewis Institute in Chicago, but transferred as a senior to the University of Chicago in 1899, graduating in 1900 with honorable mentions at the age of 39. In 1902, she began her master's program at the University of Chicago, studying sociology under professors such as William Isaac Thomas, George Hebert Mead, Thorstein Veblen, and John Dewey. She received her degree in 1904, with the thesis "The Hunting Pattern of Mind as Expressed in Totemism among the North American Indians," in which she noted that hunting animals causes biological responses influencing social organizations and systems.

== Anthropology research ==
After graduating with her master's, Benedict began studying under Frederick Starr, whose focus had turned to tribes in the Philippines when his former students David Prescott Barrows and Merton Leland Miller took posts in the Philippine Commission. Benedict attended Starr's seminars in anthropology, most notably a course on "practical ethnology" which utilized a 1904 St. Louis World's Fair display that had been largely organized by Albert Ernest Jenks and depicted a village with Bagobo people. This lecture and exhibit largely reflected the U.S. imperialist project that had taken civil control of the Philippine Islands in 1898 following the end of the Spanish-American War, and introduced Benedict to the Bagobo tribe, which she soon began to study in earnest. She continued taking Starr's seminars and conducted research in fall 1905 at the Field Museum under George A. Dorsey. Benedict was intent on traveling to the Philippines to study the Bagobo for at least one year; while she requested funds from several museum curators, including William Henry Holmes at the National Museum of Natural History and Clark Wissler at the American Museum of Natural History (AMNH), she was unable to obtain sponsorship.

After the Field Museum received a donation of $20,000 in March 1906 from Robert Fowler Cummings specifically for ethnological research in the Philippines, Dorsey authorized Benedict to travel to the Mindanao region of Davao with a budget of $2,000 to obtain a collection of material objects and skeletons.

Dorsey encouraged Benedict to visit other international museums on her travels; departing from Boston in April 1906, she met with Wissler and Herman Bumpus at the AMNH; Alfred Cort Haddon and Charles Gabriel Seligman in Cambridge; and A.W. Niewenhuis at the Rijksmuseum voor Volkenkunde in Leiden, all of whom gave her valuable advice and tools.

Benedict's field expenses were self-funded; upon arriving in Davao, she accepted a teaching position in Santa Cruz to help finance her work. While living there, Benedict became familiar with other Americans working in the community, including Sarah and Elizabeth Metcalf, though she infrequently socialized with the other expatriates and later came to believe that their anthropological work was sabotaging hers. She was a respected teacher and found it useful to study child psychology and Bagobo folk classification of plants and fishes. Benedict also began learning the Bagobo language with the help of a young boy.

In her limited spare time, Benedict engaged with the locals to begin building the collection for the Field Museum; people looking to sell items would visit her hut, but she encountered several obstacles, including restrictions against the sale of religious items, the personal value the Bagobo people attached to their belongings, and the work involved to understand items' contextual meanings. She soon found that more time was needed to become familiar with the people who the objects belonged to in order to truly understand the meanings of the objects, and planned to depart in June 1909 rather than 1907 as anticipated.

Additionally, Benedict spent time in the more remote village of Talun, where she was the first foreigner to witness a Ginum ceremony; these festivals typically involved a human sacrifice, but this element was omitted, likely due to her presence, as the American government strictly forbade the practice.

Benedict's mental and physical health began to deteriorate, and she ultimately returned to Chicago in fall 1908, where she presented her collection of Bagobo items to Dorsey. He valued the collection at over $2,000 and purchased only a single skull. After much negotiation, her collection of over 2,500 items was acquired by the American Museum of Natural History for about $4,000, later donating an additional 50 items to offload her personal collection. In 1911, she published an article in the museum's journal describing the collection and her experiences in Davao. The conditions of the purchase including hiring Benedict part-time to catalog the collection; Benedict moved to New York and simultaneously began her doctorate at Columbia University, studying anthropology under Franz Boas. Benedict was the first woman to earn a PhD in Anthropology at Columbia. She received her degree in 1914, and in 1916, her thesis, Study of Bagobo Ceremonial, Magic and Myth was published.

Her thesis was well-received by American Anthropologist and Man, but largely ignored in contemporary anthropology, and Benedict struggled to find funding for additional fieldwork or even academic employment, particularly during World War I. Beginning around 1918, she lectured on social service at Hunter College and library methods at the University of Michigan, and was both a lecturer and librarian at the Pennsylvania School of Social and Health Work. She was also involved with the Woman Suffrage Party in New York around 1916.

== Personal life and death ==
In 1920, she moved in with her sister in Franklinville, New Jersey, and on December 13, 1932, passed away from a heart attack in Philadelphia.
