= Helen Benedict =

American novelist and journalist

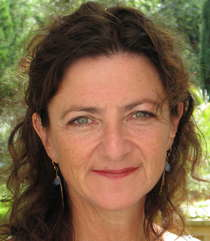
- Born: London, England
- Education: University of Sussex
- Occupations: Professor at Columbia University's Graduate School of Journalism, novelist

Helen Benedict is an American novelist and journalist, best known for her writings on social injustice, the Iraq War and refugees.

== Biography ==
Benedict was born in London, England, to parents Burton Benedict and Marion Steuber Benedict who were American anthropologists. As a child, she lived in Mauritius and Seychelles, where her parents conducted fieldwork. Seychelles became the setting for Benedict's novel, "The Edge of Eden." Her background as a child of anthropologists has informed her work both as a novelist and a journalist.

Benedict grew up partly in London, partly in California, and attended university in both England and the United States. She worked for newspapers in both countries, and obtained her master's degree from the University of California, Berkeley, in 1979. She first began to publish in the United States that year and into the 1980s, with profiles of Nobel Laureate Isaac Bashevis Singer, Susan Sontag and New York writer Leonard Michaels, later collected in her anthology, "Portraits in Print." The anthology also contained Benedict's magazine profile of Nobel laureate Joseph Brodsky, Bernard Malamud and Paule Marshall.

In 1981, Benedict moved to New York City, where she freelanced for five years, publishing short stories and articles in literary journals, magazines and newspapers. She began teaching at Columbia University's Graduate School of Journalism in 1986, where she is now a full professor.

Benedict's works have been translated and published in Egypt, Italy, the Netherlands, Greece, Germany, the Czech Republic, Hungary and Portugal. She has received fellowships from the Freedom Forum, MacDowell, Palazzo Rinaldi in Italy, the Ragdale Foundation, the Tyrone Guthrie Centre in Ireland, the Virginia Center for the Creative Arts, Ucross, I-Park and Yaddo.

== Themes ==
Benedict's novels explore the themes of war, trauma, displacement, isolation, racism and sexism, often through the eyes of people who fall outside the predominant culture. She has written of Middle Eastern and African refugees in her novel, "The Good Deed," and Iraqi refugees and war veterans in her novels "The Soldier's House," "Wolf Season" and "Sand Queen." "Sand Queen" was the first American literary novel about a female soldier serving in the Iraq War. Other subjects she has covered include: Dominican American immigrants, Greek peasants, mixed-race teenagers, former convicts and the descendants of slaves. Many of these themes are evident in her novel, "The Edge of Eden," which is set in 1960 in the colonial islands of Seychelles.

Benedict's eighth novel, "The Good Deed," published in April 2024 by Red Hen Press, was a finalist for the 2025 Dayton Literary Peace Prize and received pre-publication accolades from Publishers Weekly, Kirkus Reviews and Booklist. Her previous novel, "Wolf Season," was published in 2017 by Bellevue Literary Press, won a starred review from The Library Journal and was listed as an editors recommended read by The Military Times, Literary Hub, Columbia Magazine, BookBrowse and elsewhere. Its predecessor, the novel, "Sand Queen," was published in 2011 by Soho Press and in paperback in July 2012. The Boston Globe praised the novel, calling it "'The Things They Carried' for women in Iraq." Robert Olen Butler wrote on its cover, "Every war eventually yields works of art which transcend politics and history and illuminate our shared humanity. Helen Benedict's brilliant new novel has done just that with this century's American war in Iraq. "Sand Queen" is an important book by one our finest literary artists." Wisconsin Public Radio's To The Best of Our Knowledge featured an interview with Benedict about "Sand Queen," calling it one of "this year's best new novels about war."

The material for "Wolf Season" and "Sand Queen" came from Benedict's research for her 2009 nonfiction book, "The Lonely Soldier: The Private War of Women in Iraq." In "The Lonely Soldier," Benedict describes the experiences of female troops fighting in the Iraq War and their abuse at the hands of their male comrades. "The Lonely Soldier" received the Ken Book Award in 2009.

Benedict's writings on women at war inspired the award-winning 2012 documentary, "The Invisible War," and an ongoing lawsuit against the Pentagon on behalf of service members who were sexually assaulted in the military.

Benedict's nonfiction books have concentrated on refugees and the field of sexual assault and abuse of women. Her most influential nonfiction books to date have been "The Lonely Soldier "(Beacon Press, 2009) and "Virgin or Vamp: How The Press Covers Sex Crimes," (Oxford University Press, 1992).

A play Benedict wrote based on her interviews with women soldiers, "The Lonely Soldier Monologues," was also produced in 2009 at two New York theaters, The Theater for the New City and La Mama Experimental Theatre Club, where it was reviewed by The New York Times. An article Benedict wrote on the same subject, "The Private War of Women Soldiers," won the James Aronson Award for Social Justice Journalism in 2008. In 2010, her article "The Scandal of Military Rape" won the EMMA Award for Exceptional Magazine Story.

For her writings on soldiers and war, Benedict was awarded the 2013 Ida B. Wells Award for Bravery in Journalism and was named one of the 21 Leaders of the 21st Century by Women's E-News.

== Published works ==
=== Fiction ===
- A World Like This (1990)
- Bad Angel (1997)
- The Sailor's Wife (2000)
- The Opposite of Love (2007)
- The Edge of Eden (2009)
- Sand Queen (2011)
- Wolf Season (2017)
- The Good Deed (2024)
- The Soldier's House (2026)

=== Non-fiction ===
- Safe, Strong, and Streetwise (1987)
- Portraits in Print (1991)
- Virgin or Vamp: How the Press Covers Sex Crimes (1992)
- Recovery: How to Survive Sexual Assault (1994)
- The Lonely Soldier: The Private War of Women Serving in Iraq (2009)
- Map of Hope and Sorrow: Stories of Refugees Trapped in Greece co-authored with Eyad Awwadawnan (2022)

=== Selected articles ===
- "The Private War of Women Soldiers" Salon, 3 March 2007
- "The Scandal of Military Rape" Ms. Magazine fall, 2008
- "Why Soldiers Rape" In These Times, 13 August 2008
- "For Women Warriors, Deep Wounds, Little Care" The New York Times Op-Ed, 26 May 2008
- "Drowning in the Garden of Eden" Washington Post, 22 November 2009
- "The Plight of Women Soldiers" The Nation, 5 May 2009
- "Women at War Face Sexual Violence" BBC News, 17 April 2009
- "When Johnny Comes Marching In" The New York Times, 10 April 2009
- "Betrayal in the Field" Columbia Magazine, Spring 2009
- "How to Lie with Statistics" Huffington Post, 20 March 2009
- "Violent Veterans: The Big Picture" Huffington Post, 14 January 2009

=== Selected anthologies ===
- "The Language of Rape" in Transforming a Rape Culture (1993, 2004)
- "Literary Journalism and the Media" in The Encyclopedia of International Media & Communications (2003)
- "Fiction vs. Nonfiction" in The Practical Writer (2004)
- Afterword of "Villette" by Charlotte Brontë, Signet Classic (2004)
- Foreword in "Powder: Writing by Women in the Ranks" (2008)
- "Women at War" in War Is (2008)
