= Robert E. Wood =

United States Army general (1879–1969)

General Robert E. Wood
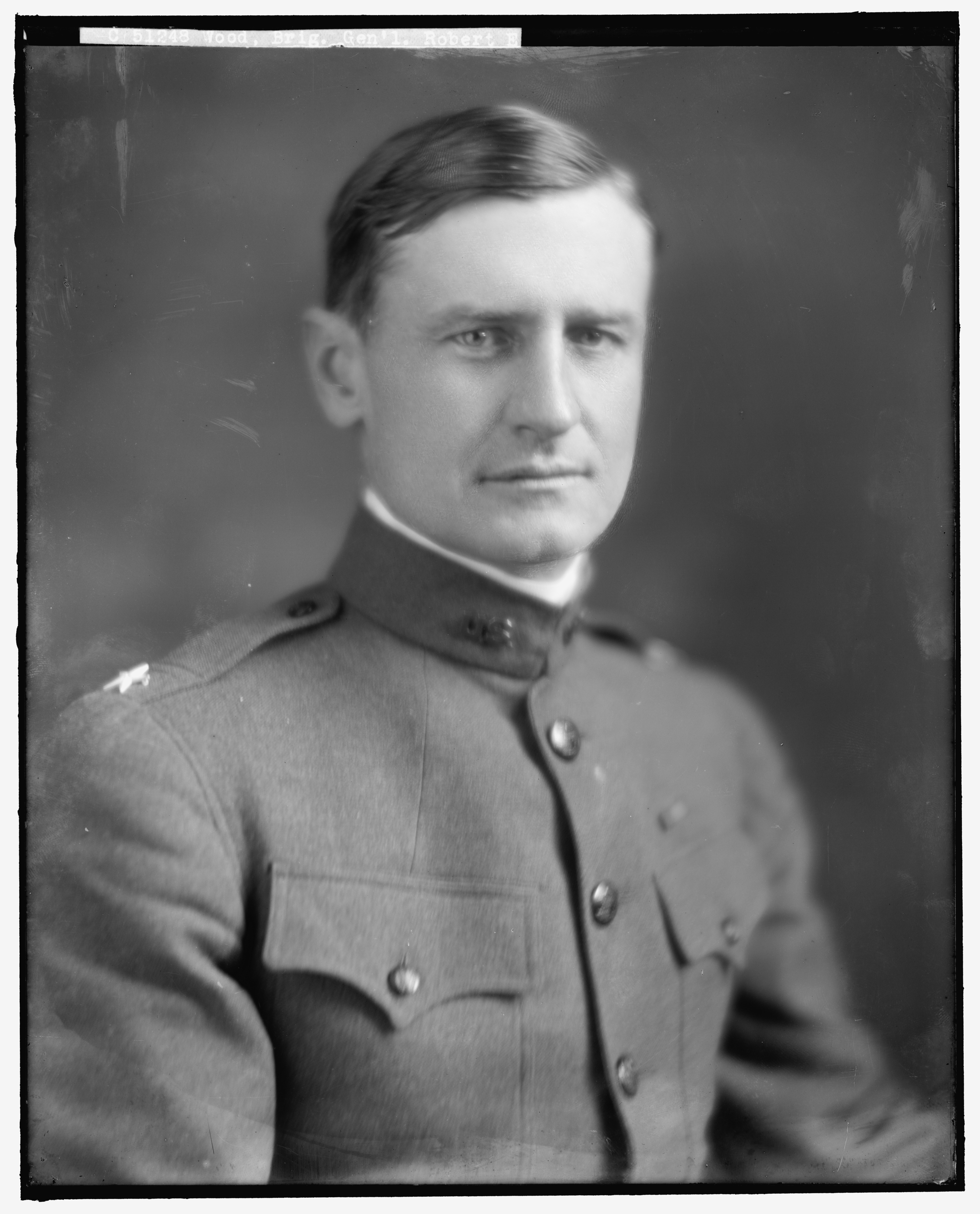
- Born: Robert Elkington Wood; June 13, 1879; Kansas City, Missouri, U.S.
- Died: November 6, 1969 (aged 90); Lake Forest, Illinois, U.S.
- Burial place: Lake Forest Cemetery
- Spouse: Mary Hardwick (m. 1908)
- Children: 2
- Military career
- Allegiance: United States
- Branch: United States Army
- Service years: 1900–1915; 1917–1919
- Rank: Brigadier general
- Conflicts: Philippine–American War; Moro Rebellion; World War I; Western Front
- Awards: Distinguished Service Medal; Legion of Honour-Chevalier (France); Order of St Michael and St George (Great Britain)
- Other work: Business executive

Signature
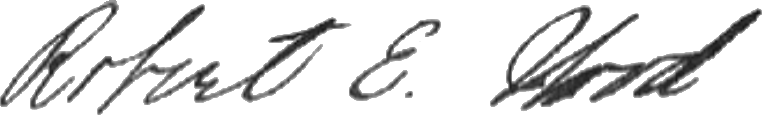

Robert Elkington Wood (June 13, 1879 – November 6, 1969) was an American military officer and business executive. After retiring from the U.S. Army as a brigadier general, Wood had a successful career as a corporate executive, most notably with Sears, Roebuck and Company. A Republican, Wood was a leader in the Old Right American Conservatism movement from the 1920s through the 1960s as well as a key financial backer of the America First Committee prior to the United States' entry into World War II.

== Early life ==
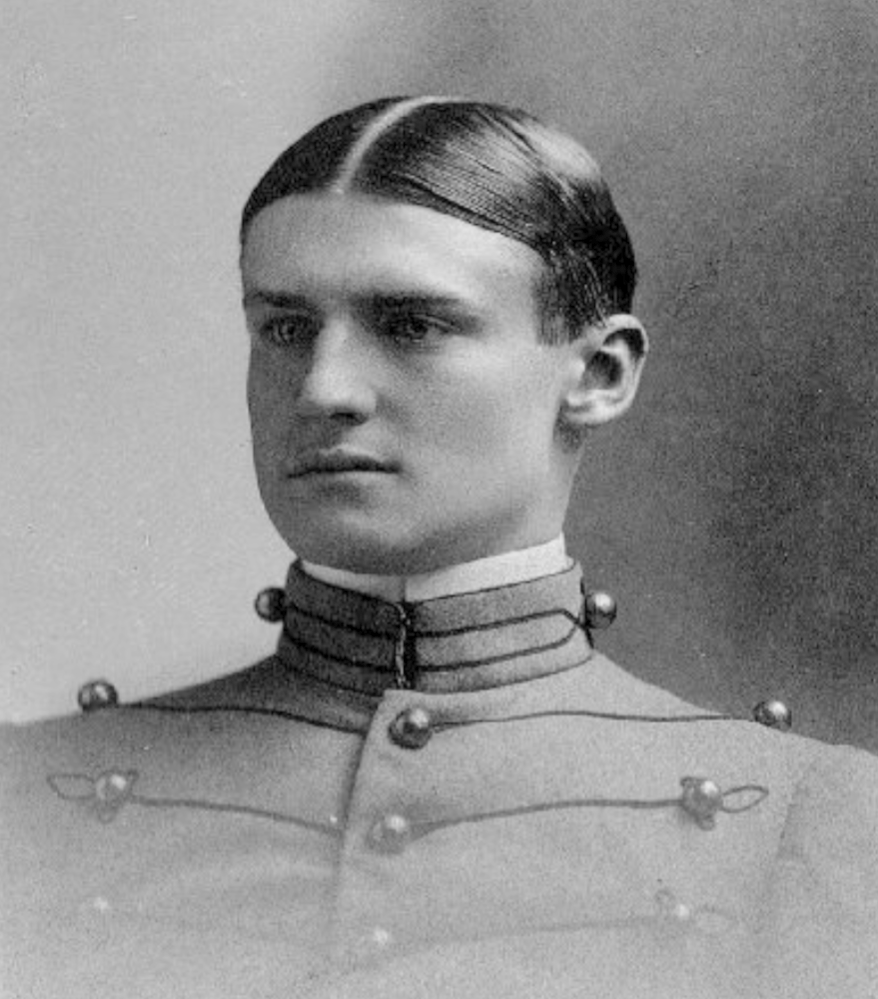
At West Point in 1900

Wood was born to Robert Whitney and Lillie (Collins) Wood in Kansas City, Missouri. Following graduation from Kansas City Central High School in 1895 he attended the United States Military Academy at West Point, graduating in 1900 as a second lieutenant of cavalry.

== Military career ==
As an officer in the United States Army, he was stationed in the Philippines participating in field service during the Philippine insurrection. From 1902 to 1903 he was assigned to Fort Assinniboine (Hill County, Montana) and then for three years as an instructor at West Point. In 1905 he became the Assistant Chief Quartermaster and later the Chief Quartermaster and Director of the Panama Railroad Company. He served in the Panama Canal Zone for ten years, during the construction of the canal.

Wood retired in July 1915, by special act of Congress, as a major. Following this retirement he worked as assistant to the vice president of the E. I. du Pont de Nemours Company and headed operations in the United States, Venezuela, and Trinidad for the General Asphalt Company. He briefly served as Purchasing Agent of the Emergency Fleet Corporation in early 1917.

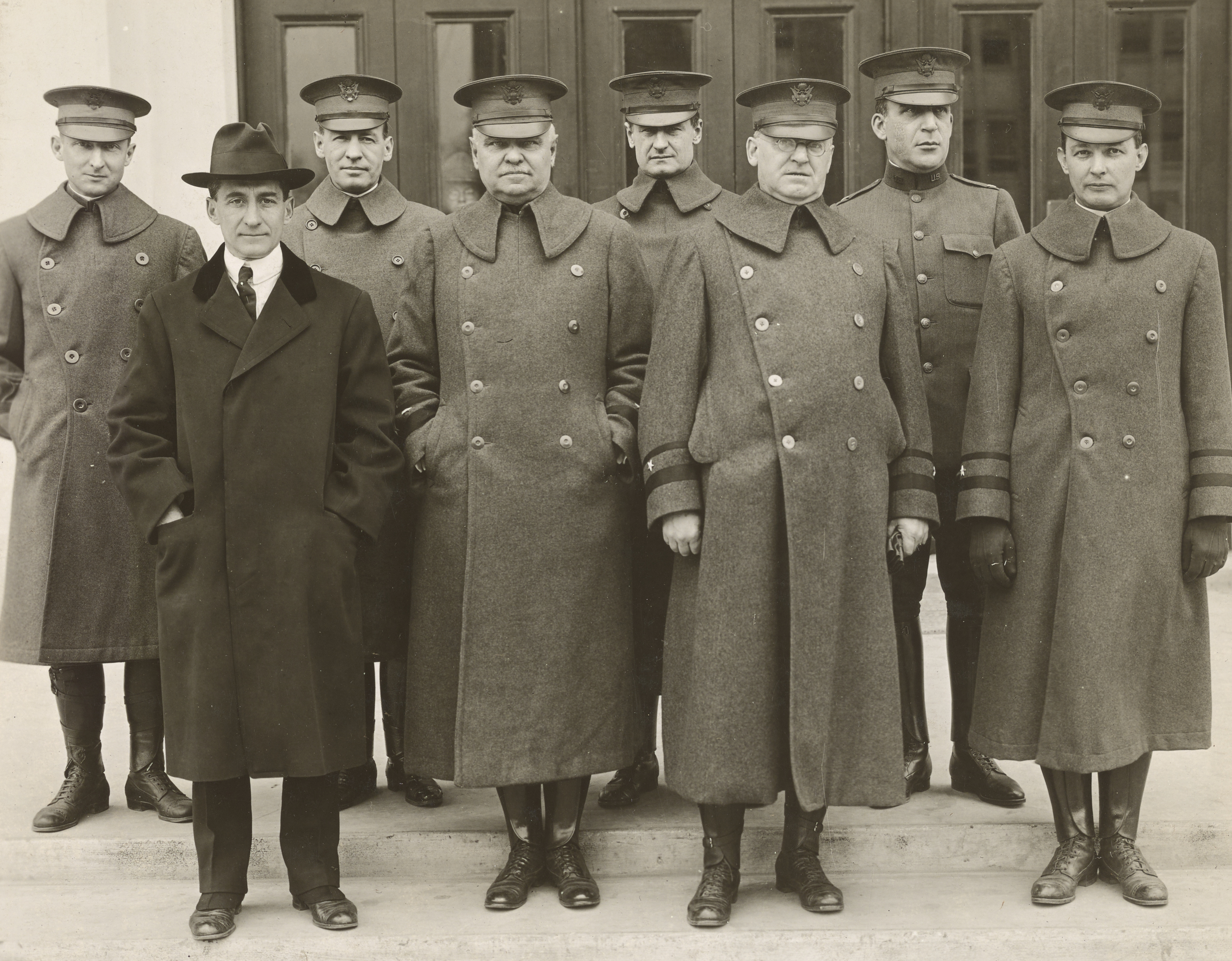
Major General George W. Goethals and members of his staff, December 7, 1918. Front row, left to right: Gerard Swope, Major General George W. Goethals, Brigadier General Herbert Lord, Brigadier General William H. Rose. Back row, left to right: Edwin W. Fullam, Brigadier General Frank T. Hines, Brigadier General Robert E. Wood, Colonel F. B. Wells.

In 1917, on the eve of America's entry into the First World War, Wood returned to the Army as an Infantry Lieutenant Colonel. He served in Europe with the 42nd (Rainbow) Division and was promoted to colonel. Later in the war Wood would serve as transportation director for the entire American Expeditionary Forces (AEF) in France. Towards the end of the war, he was promoted to brigadier general and made acting Quartermaster General of the Army. In June 1916, prior to America's entry into the war, Wood's brother, Captain Stanley Wood, was killed in action while serving as a volunteer in the Canadian Army.

== Post military career ==
After leaving the army again in 1919, Wood became an executive at Montgomery Ward, eventually becoming a vice-president of the company. In 1924, he left Montgomery Ward to take a position of vice-president of Sears Roebuck. He became one of the most important leaders in that company's history, serving as president from 1928 until 1939 and as chairman from 1939 until 1954. Under his leadership, Sears shifted the focus of its operations from mail-order sales to retail sales at large urban department stores. Wood also created Allstate Insurance as a subsidiary of Sears.

In 1950, he was admitted as an honorary member of the New York Society of the Cincinnati.

Wood, once again, served as an honorary chairman for Sears from 1968 until shortly before his death in 1969.

== Political life ==
Wood was also politically active and was noted as a conservative Republican. However, this did not prevent Wood from initially supporting the New Deal and voting for Franklin Roosevelt in the 1932 and 1936 Presidential elections. He would also be appointed as a member of Roosevelt's Business Council in 1935. Nevertheless, Wood would eventually become disenchanted with Roosevelt and the New Deal by the late 1930s. In 1940, he helped found the America First Committee to oppose U.S. involvement in the Second World War; he served as the committee's first president on an interim basis. In 1954, Wood funded the creation of the Manion Forum, a conservative radio program hosted by Clarence Manion.

Wood financed the National Economic Council, a far-right group that opposed civil rights and linked it to communism.

== Personal life ==
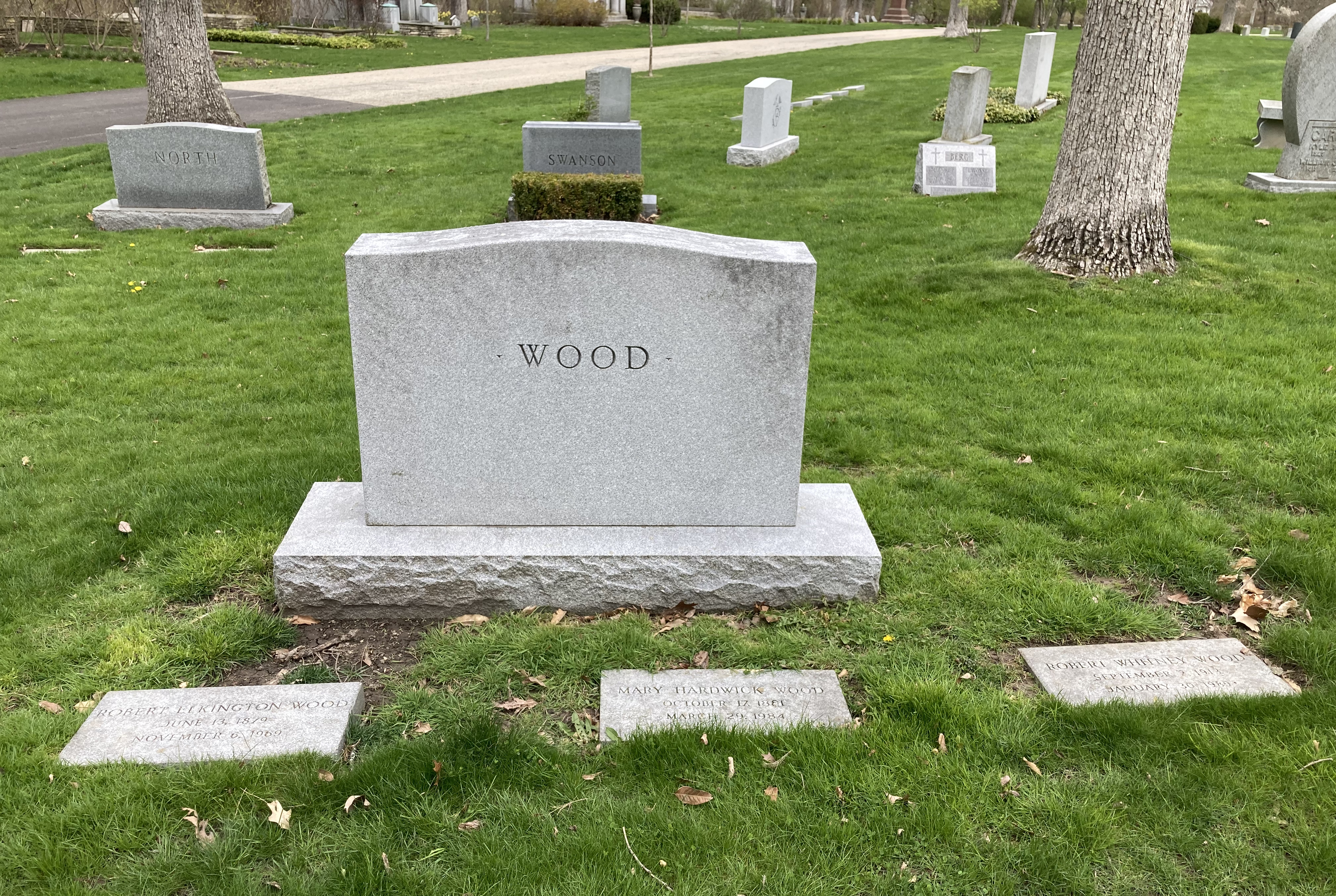
Wood's grave at Lake Forest Cemetery

Robert Wood married Mary Butler Hardwick of Augusta, Georgia on April 30, 1908. They were the parents of five children: four daughters and a son.

Wood died at his home in Lake Forest on November 6, 1969, and was buried at Lake Forest Cemetery.

A great grandson, Keene Addington, is a Chicago restaurateur who currently runs the Tortoise Supper Club.

== Decorations and honors ==
- Distinguished Service Medal (U.S. Army), United States
- Knight of the Legion of Honor, France
- Honorary CMG (UK)

Bronze busts honoring Wood and seven other industry magnates stand between the Chicago River and the Merchandise Mart in downtown Chicago, Illinois. Woodfield Mall in Schaumburg, Illinois, where Sears had been a tenant, is named in part after General Wood. Formerly, a Boys and Girls Club in Chicago had also been named after him.

Wood was inducted into the Junior Achievement U.S. Business Hall of Fame in 1979.
