= Bertram Benedict =

American author and editor

- Born: May 2, 1892; Baltimore, Maryland, U.S.
- Died: June 1978 (aged 86); Easton, Maryland, U.S.
- Education: Johns Hopkins University
- Occupations: Author, editor
- Spouse: Ruth Sarles Benedict

Bertram Benedict (May 2, 1892 – June 1978) was an American author and editor. He was a partial owner of the Editorial Research Reports, and a book reviewer for The New York Times Magazine. His 1921 book, The Larger Socialism, was a critique of socialism in the United States.

== Early life ==
Bertram Benedict was born in 1892 in Baltimore, Maryland. He graduated from Johns Hopkins University in 1912.

== Career ==
Benedict began his career as a social worker in Pittsburgh and Syracuse. In 1917, he was hired by the Bureau of National Literature, and authored several books, including The Larger Socialism, published in 1921. In the book, Benedict, who was a member of the Socialist Party of America, considers whether socialism is more Christian than capitalism, and criticizes the over-reliance of Marxian theory, especially its focus on social classes, in the American context. Benedict contended that socialism failed to appear attractive to most Americans because most socialists were born outside the United States and failed to adapt its tenets to the reality of rural America, whose economy was primarily agricultural, not industrial. He added that most Americans were "unable or unwilling to think in abstract terms"; instead, he believed Americans would need a charismatic socialist leader to find it attractive. In the American Journal of Sociology, Victor E. Helleberg wrote that the book was "an attempt to reconstruct the strategy of socialist campaigning by broadening the outlook and considering carefully the situation in the United States." Reviewing it for the Journal of Political Economy, Paul Douglas called it "an extraordinary clear and candid book."

Benedict first worked for the Editorial Research Reports in 1929. He acquired a stake in 1944, and left the company in 1959. He reviewed books for The New York Times Magazine.

== Personal life and death ==
Benedict married Ruth Sarles Benedict. They resided in Oxford, Maryland.

Benedict died of cancer in 1978 at Memorial Hospital in Easton, Maryland, aged 86.

== Selected works ==
- The Larger Socialism (1921)
- History of Great Wars
- Messages and Papers of Presidents (ed.)
