= Elizabeth H. Metcalf =

American amateur anthropologist

Elizabeth Henshaw Metcalf
- Born: April 15, 1852
- Died: 1925 (aged 72–73); Manila, Philippines
- Known for: Anthropology research
- Parents: N. W. Metcalf (father); Caroline Henshaw (mother)
- Relatives: Wallace Metcalf; Sarah Sprague Metcalf

Elizabeth Henshaw Metcalf (April 15, 1852 – 1925) was an American amateur anthropologist who conducted fieldwork among the Bagobo in the Philippines. After meeting and corresponding with Bagobo participants of the 1904 Louisiana Purchase Exposition, Elizabeth and her sister, Sarah Metcalf, amassed one of the best collections of Bagobo textile and clothing in the United States, including rare examples of dua talian cloth and three-panel skirts that show the overdyeing technique called sináke. Elizabeth and Sarah Metcalfs’ collection was donated to the University Museum at the University of Pennsylvania and the National Museum of Natural History at the Smithsonian Institution.

== Early life ==
Elizabeth Henshaw Metcalf was born on April 15, 1852, to N. W. Metcalf and Caroline Henshaw [3], who were married on July 17, 1850. Elizabeth had one brother, Wallace Metcalf, and one sister, Sarah Sprague Metcalf, who was born on March 5, 1858. Elizabeth Henshaw Metcalf, as well as her two siblings, were descendants of the composer Thomas Hastings. Elizabeth Metcalf herself was a musician and composer and in 1896, Elizabeth was elected to the board of directors of the New England Conservatory.

== The Louisiana Purchase Exposition in St. Louis ==
American anthropological research in the Philippines began after the establishment of the Bureau of Non-Christian Tribes of the Islands as part of the Department of Interior in 1901. This Bureau brought the ethnological displays, including both people and objects, to St. Louis, Missouri for the Louisiana Purchase Exposition in 1904. The Bureau promoted research conducted by anthropologists trained in the United States, and as evidenced by the Louisiana Purchase Exposition, anthropological theory during this time provided a scientific justification for American supremacy over the Philippine Islands, after their acquisition by the United States in 1898. The Bureau was later reorganized as the Philippine Ethnological Survey.

Many scholars have critiqued the Louisiana Purchase Exposition displays for their use as colonial propaganda, and their racist objectification of people on display. Archival scholar Ricardo Punzalan argued that the Louisiana Purchase Exposition, or the St. Louis World's Fair of 1904 as it was also known, had colonial interests related to cultural exploration for commercial purposes. Punzalan notes that "official reports and representations of the Philippines in media and expositions such as the St. Louis World’s Fair of 1904 depicted the former Spanish colony as backward, uncivilized, unfit for self-governance" and therefore justified the American adoption of the territory with the Treaty of Paris on February 6, 1899.

Art historian Beverly Grindstaff argues that the living display of almost 1,200 people from the Philippines worked to normalize the adoption of this territory and the forced movement of Filipinos into prisons and concentration camps. The exhibits worked against ideas of a unified Philippine national identity by showcasing the insular cultures of more than 80 unique ethno-linguistic groups as racialized "tribes." The exhibits shifted the identity of those on display to that of an object. Historian Robert Rydell also remarked in his book, All the World's a Fair, that the 1904 Fair "made the acquisition of the Philippine Islands and continued overseas economic expansion seem as much a part of the manifest destiny of the nation as the Louisiana Purchase itself."

Elizabeth Henshaw Metcalf and her sister, Sarah, became interested in the Philippines and the Bagobo people after attending the Louisiana Purchase Centennial Exposition, a world's fair held in St. Louis in 1904. The Metcalfs initially travelled to St. Louis to view the mock-up of the Boer War but ended up spending considerable time photographing and conversing with the Bagobo and the Igorot. Elizabeth and Sarah Metcalf visited the Philippine Reservation at the Expedition, which included "education displays" of living Bagobo people. The Philippine Reservation also housed ethnographic "relics" in museum-like displays away from the living Bagobo. The exhibits of ethnographic objects were not housed in the ethnological villages and people did not always have to pay to see these objects.

The Metcalf sisters, unlike other fairgoers, approached the Bagobo people "as fellow musicians, artists deserving of sympathy, unfortunate, left behind in quarantine, and eventually given musical instruments that were inferior or broken." At the St. Louis Exposition, Elizabeth and Sarah Metcalf spoke with Igorot and Bagobo participants, specifically 38 Bagobo men, women and children at the Exposition. Given Elizabeth Metcalf's musical background, she was very interested in Bagobo gong music and became impressed by how they could play broken or inferior gongs well. On the voyage from the Philippines to the United States, an outbreak of smallpox among the Bagobo lead to the death of an American interpreter and friend, so they were forced into quarantine upon their arrival in St. Louis.

When the Metcalf sisters visited the Igorot and Bagobo village, they took photographs of the village members using an Eastman Kodak Brownie camera that was not regulated by Fair officials as opposed to larger tripod cameras used by professionals that had to follow Fair photographs regulations. The National Anthropological Archives houses some of the Metcalfs’ photographs from the St. Louis Exposition. Eric Brietbart also includes a photograph of Elizabeth standing with Ermolina (Bagobo) in his book, A World on Display (1977). Cherubim Quizon notes that Ermolina was likely one of the Metcalfs’ contacts from when they travelled to Mindanao in 1906.

In 1905, Elizabeth and Sarah Metcalf also visited the Lewis and Clark Centennial Exposition in Portland, Oregon and interacted with the Bontoc Igorot people. The Metcalfs visited near the end of the Exposition, which ran from June to October 1905.

== Anthropological research among the Bagobo in Mindanao ==
In 1906, Elizabeth and Sarah Metcalf travelled to Mindanao in the Philippines. The Metcalfs rented a house in the city of Zamboanga from April to August 1906. This city was also the seat of the American government, with Mindanao and the Sulu Archipelago under the jurisdiction of the Moro Province. The Metcalfs soon moved to Santa Cruz to be closer to the Bagobo people. Santa Cruz separated the southern part of the Davao district which was rapidly changing as a result of new abaca plantations. The Metcalfs interacted with those whose communities surrounded the Davao Gulf and were affected by the plantation economy, Protestant missionary initiatives, and the introduction of public schools focused on the children of plantation workers. Plantation workers were largely made up of the indigenous Bagobo, Tagakaolo, and Mandaya people.

The Metcalf sisters communicated with the Bagobo prior to traveling in Santa Cruz in Davao, so they were already known and expected by Bagobo community members and had been introduced to the expatriate plantation owners who wielded political influence. The Metcalfs lived in an area where American plantations owners lived, many of whom were very anti-Filipino and were a self-regulated economic power that took on the power of district authority.

Elizabeth and Sarah Metcalf remained in the Philippines from 1906 to 1910, during which time they photographed and collected ethnographic objects. Elizabeth and Sarah Metcalf worked to gather one of the best collections of Bagobo textiles and clothing in the United States. While the Metcalfs were living in Santa Cruz, Laura Watson Benedict was also gathering Bagobo collections that was later purchased by the American Museum of Natural History in New York. Benedict and the Metcalfs were well acquainted with each other as well as with Fay-Cooper Cole, who also amassed a southern Mindanao collection for the Field Museum’s Cumming Expedition of the Philippines. Both Benedict and the Metcalfs did not receive funding from an affiliated museum, which cut Benedict's own research short.

As the Metcalfs were working in the same Davao region around the same time, they were in competition with Benedict and Cole for Bagobo ethnographic material but the Metcalf sisters "were not viewed as peers by either Cole or Benedict." Cole was affiliated with and funded by the Field Museum, and Benedict was unofficially affiliated with and supervised by George Dorsey, Cole's senior colleague in Chicago. Benedict's research was also different from the Metcalfs’ as she focused on ritual behavior and collected material from less contemporary areas in Mindanao. The Metcalfs collected in village and coastal settings and actively collected items that were commercially produced and sold.

Cherubim Quizon, an associate professor of anthropology at Seton Hall University, notes that it is likely that the two women maintained their own residence because of their independent income during this period. In 1910, Elizabeth worked as a teacher of industrial arts in the Santa Cruz public school, using her knowledge of the Bagobo to inform her educational work but she only worked as a teacher for one year of the four that she and her sister spent in Santa Cruz. Benedict also worked as a public schoolteacher in the Davao district.

The U.S. Bureau of Education organized the "Teachers’ Camp," built in Baguio in Luzon, and the Metcalf sisters attended the opening of the assembly in 1908 and were listed on the roster of the Assembly Camp. The "Teachers’ Camp" produced a newspaper, called the Teachers Assembly Herald, that featured the Metcalf sisters in 1908. During an anthropological conference organized by the assembly on Thursday, May 14, 1908, Elizabeth Metcalf discussed the "Gong-Music of the Mindanao" and Sarah Metcalf discussed "the Dress of the Bagobo." Elizabeth Metcalf's discussion focused on different types of Moro gongs, including the agung, inagungan, kulintang, or kulintangan and gandingan, describing which instruments were played exclusively by women or men and how the tone of a gong was tested.

== Career ==
In 1910, Elizabeth and Sarah Metcalf returned to the United States as a result of the mounting tensions of World War I. In 1911, Elizabeth Metcalf presented the ethnological research they had conducted among the Bagobo people to the conference of the American Anthropological Association. Elizabeth Metcalf had become a member of the Association shortly before her presentation [2]. Metcalf also worked to begin negotiating the sale of most of their Bagobo collection to the University Museum of Pennsylvania at Philadelphia. During this period, the Metcalfs resided in Worcester, Massachusetts at their family home and with friends in Baltimore.

Cherubim Quizon acknowledged how they struggled with being outsiders in the field of anthropology because they were unmarried, older women who had no formal training in anthropology or museology, no university affiliations, no supervision or financial support from museums or curators for their collecting efforts, and no professional or familial obligations that compelled them to travel to the Philippines to conduct research. Since the Metcalf sisters were not married, they did not censor their interactions to be subsidiary to anyone and freely criticized parts of the American colonial presence in the Philippines.

== The Metcalf Collection ==
Elizabeth and Sarah Metcalf sold part of their Bagobo collections to the University Museum of Anthropology and Archaeology in Pennsylvania in 1916 and the rest of the collections were loaned to the Smithsonian National Museum of Natural History. These collections were donated to the Smithsonian before the Metcalf sisters returned to the Philippines. The Metcalfs did not return to study their collections and did not publish any full-length reports on their research in Mindanao, which both Benedict and Cole did. Although Elizabeth did present their research in Bagobo at the conference of the American Anthropological Association, only an abstract was published related to her presentation instead of a paper.

The collection sold to the Philadelphia University Museum represents many men's and women's upper and lower garments made from abaca cloth. Unlike Benedict's collection, the Metcalfs collection includes many examples of lower status non-ikat textiles. Their collection includes several examples of a cloth called dua talian in Mindanao, in which the fabric is patterned by twill weave that requires a unique warping and harnessing procedure different from ikat or other resist-dye processes. The Metcalf collection also contains two examples of Bagobo three-panel skirts with mother panels that have been overdyed using a technique called sináke. There are no other sináke Bagobo textiles in any other American museum collection, including in Benedict's and Cole's collection.

Historian Pat Afable described how the Metcalfs contributed documentation related to the plant materials used in Philippine basket-making and weaving textiles. As many of the fibers used during the late nineteenth century are no longer used, their collection documentation is useful for studying technology in the Philippines in this period. Because of Elizabeth Metcalf's work as an industrial arts teacher, the Metcalfs also documented the materials used in industrial education classes. American industrial teachers were responsible for introducing Native American basketry techniques into Philippine schools. The Metcalfs were not directly involved in this, but their collections, including those from school exhibits and urban fairs, help to document American colonial education in the Philippines.

== Later life ==
Around 1915, Elizabeth and Sarah Metcalf returned to the Philippines, where they lived in their "Little Home Shop" or "Curio" shop in Manila and sold hand-made crafts. "Curio" was a term used in the Philippines for hand-made crafts, such as basketry, embroidery, and wood sculptures, and this term was often used by stores that sold local crafts up until World War II. Cherubim Quizon notes that "they became reluctant entrepreneurs, purveyors of ‘native handicrafts’" and worked to collect objects from the Igorot and Ifugao in Luzon. The Metcalfs eventually rented a house on Mabini Street in Manila to sell ethnographic artifacts produced by the Igorot, Bagobo, and Muslim groups. The Metcalfs were known for jusi and piña embroidery and were often patronized by American expatriates. Some of this embroidery was later donated by Sarah Metcalf to the Worcester Art Museum in memory of her sister Elizabeth.

Benedict struggled to support her collection activities on a schoolteacher salary, but the Metcalfs were able to continue their work in the Philippines with Elizabeth only working one year as a schoolteacher out of the four years that she and Sarah resided in Santa Cruz. Sarah was employed by the Lawyer's Cooperative Publishing Company in the late 1800s, and Elizabeth and Sarah maintained a family home in Worcester with indications of a dependable income up until about 1916, when the Metcalfs established their "Little Home Shop" in Manila. The Metcalfs were also in contact with government officials and maintained social contacts with other expatriates and military officers and their wives in the Davao district and Manila.

While in the United States in 1912, Elizabeth and Sarah Metcalf filed a notice on February 2, 1912, that they would contest the will of their uncle, George P. Metcalf, who was a straw goods manufacturer from Framingham, Massachusetts. Their uncle, George Metcalf, died on January 14, 1912. George Metcalf planned to leave almost all of his estate to his housekeeper Ella L. Lancaster and her sister, Catherine Callahan (who also worked in George Metcalf's home), his cook, Anna Louise Johnson, and to Marie E. Rude, who also did household work in his home. There are not documents acknowledging the outcome of the contested will, but Elizabeth and Sarah Metcalf did return to the Philippines in 1915, three years after George Metcalf died.

Elizabeth became ill when she arrived in Manila in 1916 and remained in poor health until her death in 1925. After her death, Sarah returned to the United States again in late 1932 but returned to Manila in the following year. Sarah Metcalf died in 1939.

== Collection materials ==
The Elizabeth H. and Sarah S. Metcalf photograph collection related to the Philippines is currently housed at the National Anthropological Archives. This collection includes photographs of Benguet, Bagobo, Igorot, Ifugao, Moro, and Negrito people. The photograph collection also documents the military presence in the Philippines. The photographs record ceremonies, agriculture, hunting, and markets. The collection also includes postcards and photographs collected during the Metcalf sisters’ travels around the world, including in Switzerland, Yemen, Algeria, Egypt, Malaysia, Japan, and Hawaii. The National Anthropological Archives also houses correspondence between the Metcalfs and the Smithsonian Institution.

The Archives of the University Museum at the University of Pennsylvania also houses correspondence from Elizabeth and Sarah Metcalf. This correspondence is mainly connected to their collection from the Philippines and their collecting activities. In the first two decades of the twentieth century, the museum acquired a Sepik River collection purchased from Max Boehmig of Dresden after being amassed by Elizabeth and Sarah Metcalf. The Oceanic Collection from Elizabeth and Sarah Metcalf includes textiles, war plugs, woven bags and baskets, a betel mortar, a gong striker, and more.
