= Palazzo Rinaldi =

Palazzo Rinaldi Artists' Residency is a family-run artists' residency and writers' retreat set in a historical property dating from 1822. Located in the hilltop village of Noepoli, in the Pollino National Park (Basilicata region of southern Italy), it is open to professional artists of all disciplines.

Since 2008 the residency has been working closely with the small local community by regularly running summer events in the village to promote interaction with its international residents. These have included exhibitions, public workshops, talks, performances and film screenings:

- http://www.lasiritide.it/flash.php?number=1516 (2012).

A member of Res Artis, Palazzo Rinaldi was selected as one of 'Ten Of The Best Creative Getaways' by AOL Travel UK (2011) and one of Italy's 'Extraordinary Place to Stay' by the Gazzetta Italiana.
