= Ruth Sarles Benedict =

American anti-war activist, researcher, and journalist

- Born: January 28, 1906; Norwood, Ohio, U.S.
- Died: September 6, 1996 (aged 90); Washington, D.C., U.S.
- Education: Denison University; American University
- Occupation: Journalist
- Spouse: Bertram Benedict
- Parent(s): Edgar Harvey Sarles; Mary Jane Hinman

Ruth Sarles Benedict (January 28, 1906 – September 6, 1996) was an American anti-war activist, researcher and journalist. She worked for the National Council for Prevention of War as an editor and the America First Committee as head of research in the 1930s, and as a reporter for The Washington Daily News in the 1940s. From 1949 to 1960, she worked for the United States Department of State. In 1958, Benedict and her husband, Bertram Benedict, traveled to South Asia, particularly India, on behalf of the United States Information Agency, where she gave speeches on college campuses.

A book about the American First Committee authored by Benedict but edited posthumously by Bill Kauffman, with an introduction, was published in 2003.

== Works ==
- Sarles, Ruth (2003). Kauffman, Bill (ed.). A Story of America First: The Men and Women who Opposed U.S. Intervention in World War II. Westport Connecticut: Greenwood Publishing Group. ISBN 9780275975128. OCLC 716878310.
