= Lynne Olson =

American author, historian and journalist

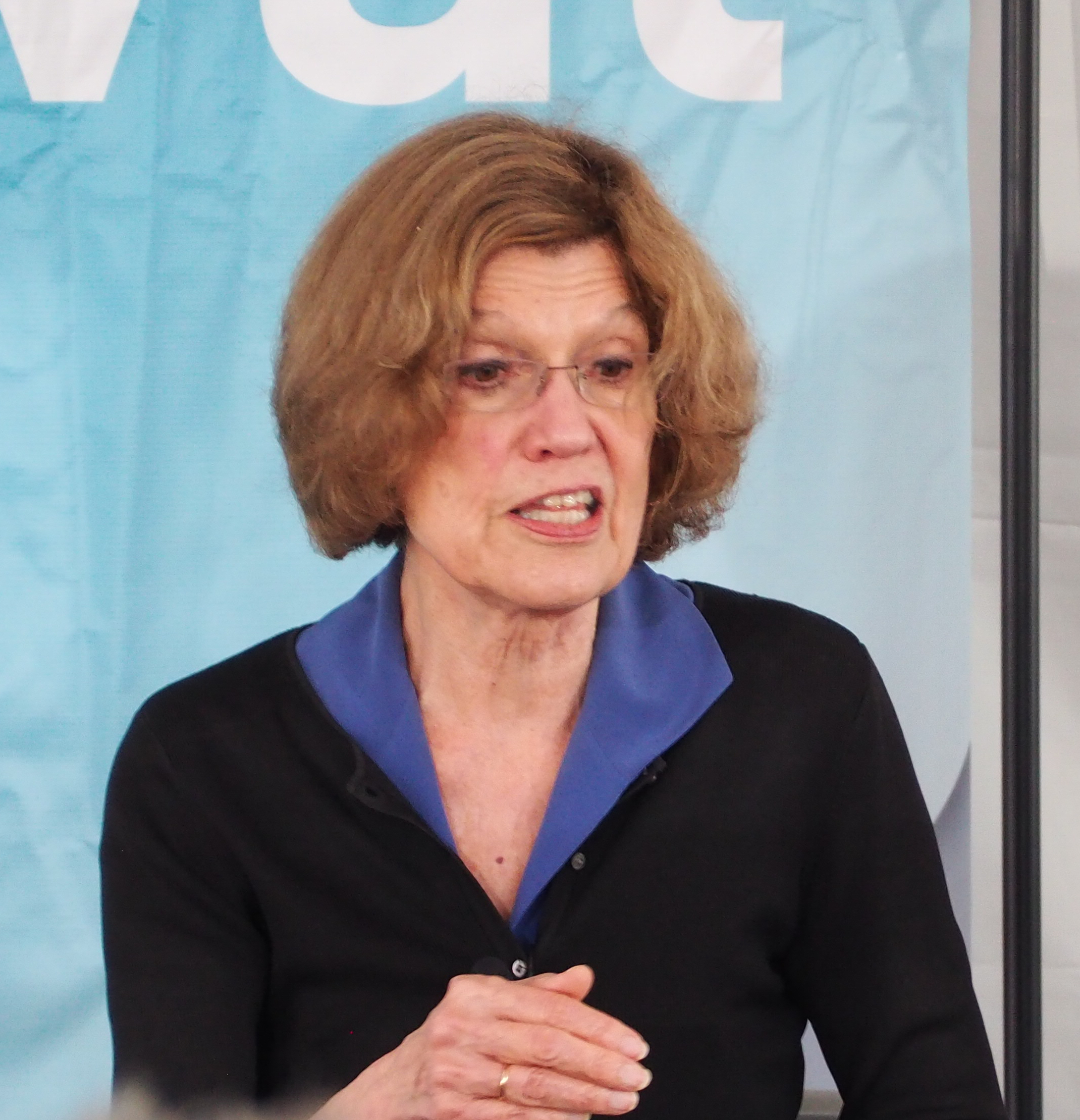
- Lynne Olson in 2023
- Born: August 19, 1949 (age 77)
- Citizenship: American
- Education: University of Arizona
- Occupations: Journalist; Author; Historian
- Notable work: Freedom's Daughters: The Unsung Heroines of the Civil Rights Movement from 1830 to 1970

Lynne Olson (born August 19, 1949) is an American author, historian and journalist. She is married to Stanley Cloud, with whom she often writes. In 1969 she graduated magna cum laude from the University of Arizona. Before becoming a writer she worked for the Associated Press and the Baltimore Sun. She has written several books on the history of the World War II era, which have received positive critical reviews.

== Awards and honors ==
In 2002 she won the Christopher Award for her book Freedom's Daughters: The Unsung Heroines of the Civil Rights Movement from 1830 to 1970.

In 2018, Olson was inducted in to the University of Arizona School of Journalism Hall of Fame.

== Selected bibliography ==
- The Murrow Boys: Pioneers on the Front Lines of Broadcast Journalism (1996, with Stanley Cloud) ISBN 978-0395680841
- Freedom's Daughters: The Unsung Heroines of the Civil Rights Movement from 1830 to 1970 (2002) ISBN 978-0684850139
- A Question of Honor: The Kosciuszko Squadron: Forgotten Heroes of World War II (2003, with Stanley Cloud) ISBN 978-0375726255
- Troublesome Young Men: The Rebels Who Brought Churchill to Power and Helped Save England (2007) ISBN 978-0374179540
- Citizens of London: The Americans Who Stood with Britain in Its Darkest, Finest Hour (2011) ISBN 978-0812979350
- Those Angry Days: Roosevelt, Lindbergh, and America's Fight Over World War II, 1939–1941 (2013) ISBN 978-0812982145
- Last Hope Island: Britain, Occupied Europe, and the Brotherhood That Helped Turn the Tide of War (2017) ISBN 978-0812997354
- Madame Fourcade's Secret War: The Daring Young Woman Who Led France's Largest Spy Network Against Hitler (2019) ISBN 978-0812994766
- Empress of the Nile: The Daredevil Archaeologist Who Saved Egypt's Ancient Temples from Destruction (2023) ISBN 978-0525509479
