= America First Committee =

American isolationist group prior to World War II

- Abbreviation: AFC
- Formation: September 4, 1940
- Founder: Robert D. Stuart Jr.
- Founded at: Yale Law School, New Haven, Connecticut, U.S.
- Dissolved: December 11, 1941
- Type: Non-partisan pressure group
- Purpose: Non-interventionism
- Headquarters: Chicago, Illinois, U.S.
- Members: 800,000–850,000 (1941)
- Chairman: Robert E. Wood
- Spokesmen: Charles Lindbergh; Charles Coughlin
- Key people: Henry Ford... and others: William H. Regnery; Robert E. Wood; Charles Lindbergh; Charles Coughlin; Lillian Gish; La Follette (Philip); La Follette (Robert Jr.); Robert R. McCormick; Norman Thomas; Sargent Shriver; Potter Stewart; Ruth Sarles Benedict
- Subsidiaries: approx. 450 chapters
- Revenue: $370,000 (1940)

The America First Committee (AFC) was an American isolationist pressure group against the United States' entry into World War II. Launched in September 1940, it surpassed 800,000 members in 450 chapters at its peak. The AFC principally supported isolationism for its own sake, and its varied coalition included Republicans, Democrats, Progressives, farmers, industrialists, communists, anti-communists, students, and journalists – however, it was controversial for the antisemitic and pro-fascist views of some of its most prominent speakers, leaders, and members.

The AFC was dissolved on December 11, 1941, four days after the attack on Pearl Harbor and three days after Roosevelt declared war on Japan alone. It was the day of Hitler's Nazi German declaration of war against the United States as well as the Fascist Mussolini's Italian declaration of war on the United States on December 11, 1941. Their declarations of war on the United States brought it into the wider European theatre of World War II. This resulted in United States joining Britain and all the British Commonwealth countries that had been standing alone at war with Germany since shortly after its outbreak in early September 1939 after the German Invasion of Poland when Hitler had broken the terms of the Munich Agreement (France, Belgium, Holland, Norway along with the other European nations had been overrun and occupied by German forces shortly afterwards).

The AFC argued that no foreign power could successfully attack a strongly defended United States, that a British defeat by Nazi Germany would not imperil American national security, and that giving military aid to Britain would risk dragging the United States into the war. The group fervently opposed measures for the British advanced by President Franklin D. Roosevelt such as the destroyers-for-bases deal and the Lend-Lease bill, but failed in its efforts to block them.

The AFC was founded by Yale Law School student R. Douglas Stuart Jr., a Princeton graduate who was heir to the Quaker Oats Company fortune, and headed by Robert E. Wood, a retired U.S. Army general who was chairman of Sears, Roebuck and Co. Its highest-profile early official member was Henry Ford, the automotive pioneer, who resigned in controversy. Halfway through the committee's 15-month existence, aviator Charles Lindbergh, who had already delivered 13 speeches on the group's behalf, officially joined it and became the most prominent speaker at its rallies. Lindbergh's presence resulted in increased criticism that America First embraced overt antisemitism and fascist sympathies. Historian Susan Dunn has concluded that, "Though most of its members were probably patriotic, well-meaning, and honest in their efforts, the AFC would never be able to purge itself of the taint of anti-Semitism."

== Background and origins ==
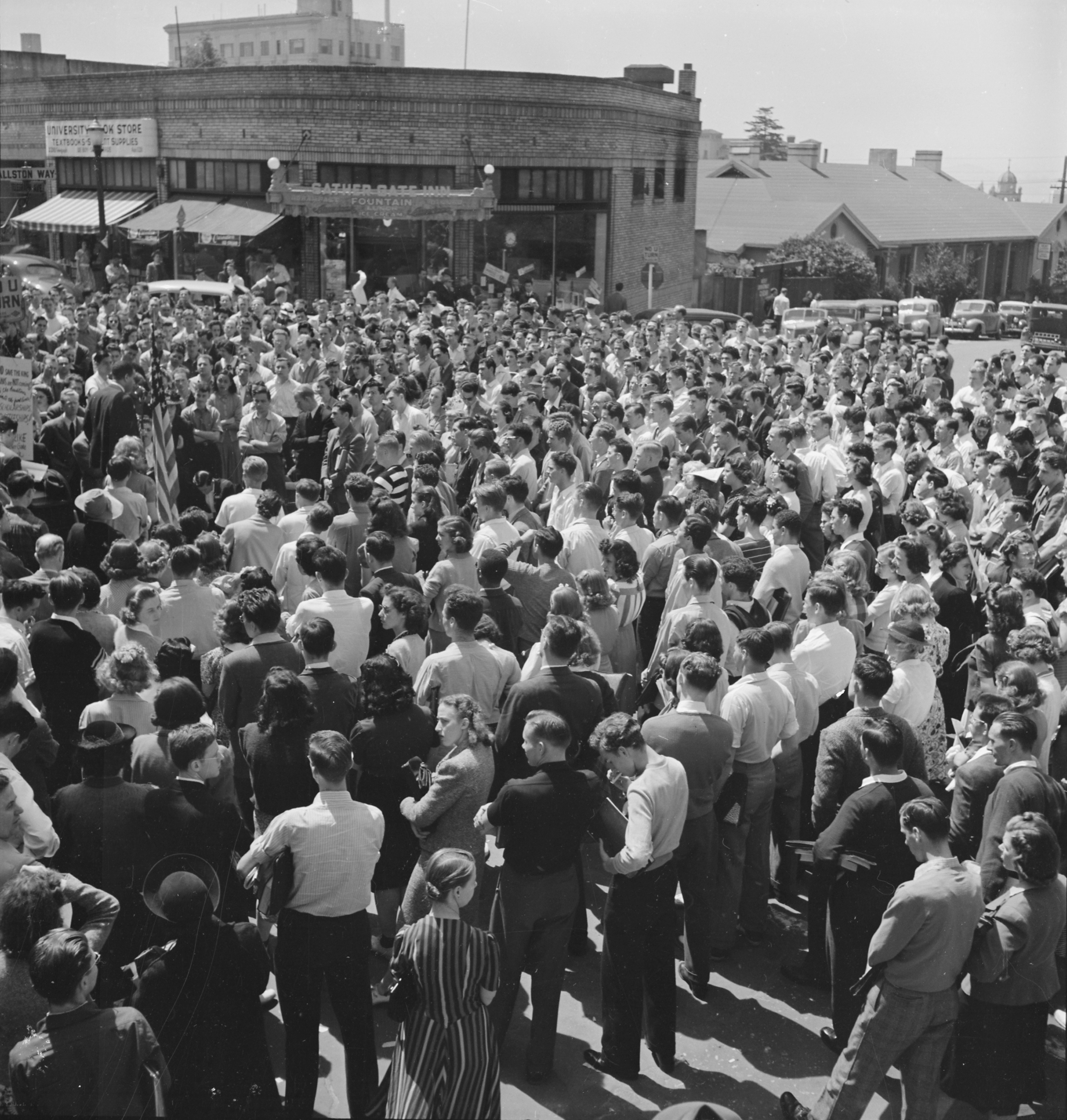
Students at the University of California (Berkeley) participate in a one-day peace strike opposing U.S. entrance into World War II, April 19, 1940

American isolationism of the late 1930s had many adherents, and as historian Susan Dunn has written, "isolationists and anti-interventionists came in all stripes and colors—ideological, economic, ethnic, geographical. Making up this eclectic coalition were farmers, union leaders, wealthy industrialists, college students, newspaper publishers, wealthy patricians, and newly arrived immigrants. There were a potpourri of affiliations and beliefs: Democrats, Republicans, Progressives, liberals, conservatives, socialists, communists, anti-communists, radicals, and pacifists." One of the most famous incidents occurred in February 1939 with a German American Bund organization's Nazi-sympathizing rally, held at the famous sports arena Madison Square Garden in New York City, which attracted thousands.

Much of the impetus for this isolationism came from college students, with Yale University being a particularly strong outpost of such sentiments. The America First Committee was established on September 4, 1940, by Yale Law School student R. Douglas Stuart, Jr. (son of R. Douglas Stuart, co-founder of Quaker Oats). Stuart had been part of an earlier anti-interventionist student organization at Yale Law School, one that began in Spring 1940 and included future president Gerald Ford, future U.S. Supreme Court justice Potter Stewart, and future diplomat Eugene Locke as signatories to an initial organizing letter. Other Yale students who became involved were future Peace Corps director during the Kennedy presidential administration (and brother-in-law) Sargent Shriver, and Kingman Brewster Jr., who would later become president of Yale University. Stuart dropped out of Yale to focus on the anti-intervention cause, and during Summer 1940, he and Brewster found support for the cause among politicians in Washington and party conventions, and among corporate figures in Stuart's home area of Chicago.

On September 5, the committee was publicly launched in a national radio broadcast by retired General Hugh S. Johnson, who had headed the National Recovery Administration (N.R.A.) during the early Great Depression as part of the New Deal programs combating the bad economic conditions for a while before President Roosevelt discharged him in 1934.

== Organization and membership ==
America First chose retired Brigadier General Robert E. Wood, the 61-year-old chairman of Sears, Roebuck and Co., to preside over the committee. Wood remained in his post until the AFC was disbanded after Germany and Italy declared war on the United States on 11 December 1941 four days after Japan's attack on Pearl Harbor.

Organizationally, America First had an executive committee of about seven people, which took the lead in forming America First policies. Its initial members included Wood, Stuart, and several businessmen from the Midwest. There was also a larger national committee, which was composed of prominent individuals who supported America First's aims. Over the course of the organization's existence, some fifty people were part of the national committee. Finally, there were local chapters organized in cities and towns of various size wherever a sizeable anti-interventionist feeling existed. The existence of chapters permitted a more decentralized fundraising structure, with the chapters typically relying more on small contributions than the national entity.

Serious organization and recruitment efforts took place from Chicago, the national headquarters of the committee, not long after the AFC's September 1940 establishment. These included the taking out of full-page advertisements in leading newspapers in various cities and paying for radio broadcasts. Fundraising drives produced about $370,000 from some 25,000 contributors. Nearly half came from a few millionaires such as William H. Regnery, H. Smith Richardson of the Vick Chemical Company, General Robert E. Wood of Sears-Roebuck, publisher Joseph M. Patterson (New York Daily News) and his cousin, publisher Robert R. McCormick (Chicago Tribune). Other funding came from executives of Montgomery Ward, Hormel Foods, and the Inland Steel Company.

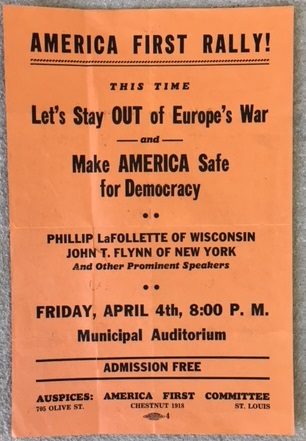
Flyer for an America First Committee rally in St. Louis, Missouri in early April 1941

Renowned aviator Charles Lindbergh and controversial Catholic radio priest Charles Coughlin would serve as the main spokesmen for the committee.

At its peak, America First claimed 800,000–850,000 members in 450 chapters, making the AFC one of the largest anti-war organizations in the history of the United States. Two-thirds of members were located within a 300-mile radius of Chicago, and 135,000 members in 60 chapters throughout Illinois, its strongest state. There were almost no AFC chapters in the American South, where traditions of involvement in the military and ancestral ties to the United Kingdom (Great Britain) were both strong.

The AFC was never able to draw sufficient funding to conduct its own public opinion polling. The New York chapter received slightly more than $190,000, most of it coming from its 47,000 contributors. As the AFC never had a national membership form or national dues, and local chapters were quite autonomous, historians point out that the organization's leaders had no idea how many "members" it had.

The America First Committee attracted the sympathies of political figures, including: Democratic senators Burton K. Wheeler of Montana and David I. Walsh of Massachusetts, and Republican senators Gerald P. Nye of North Dakota and Henrik Shipstead of Minnesota. Philip La Follette, former Governor of Wisconsin and a founder of the Wisconsin Progressive Party, was another prominent member. Overall, support from politicians was strongest in the Midwest. Wheeler and Nye were especially active as speakers at America First rallies. Other celebrities supporting America First were actress Lillian Gish and architect Frank Lloyd Wright. Following his resignation as ambassador to the Court of St. James's in late 1940, the increasingly isolationist, anti-British, and defeatist Joseph P. Kennedy Sr. was offered the chance to head the America First Committee. Members of the national committee included: advertising executive Chester Bowles, diplomat William Richards Castle Jr., journalist John T. Flynn, writer and socialite Alice Roosevelt Longworth, military officer and politician Hanford MacNider, novelist Kathleen Norris, New Deal administrator George Peek, film director Jack Conway and World War I flying ace and later aviation executive Eddie Rickenbacker.

The aforementioned Gerald Ford was one of the first members of the AFC when a chapter formed at Yale University (however he resigned from the AFC shortly afterward, lest he endanger his position as an assistant coach for Yale Bulldogs football); Potter Stewart also served on the original committee of the AFC. Gore Vidal was the head of his local America First group at Phillips Exeter Academy. Another future president, and son of the former and recently resigned American ambassador to Britain (Joseph P. Kennedy Sr.), John F. Kennedy contributed $100 with an attached note, "What you are doing is vital."

== Issues ==
When the war began in Europe (Nazi Germany's invasion of Poland) in September 1939, most Americans, including politicians, demanded neutrality regarding Europe. Although most Americans supported strong measures against Japan, Europe was the focus of the America First Committee. The public mood was changing, however, especially after the fall of France in the spring of 1940. Still, while a majority of the public favored sending material assistance to Great Britain in its fight against Nazi Germany, a majority also wanted the United States to stay out of direct participation in the war.

There were various uncoordinated isolationist groups active during 1939–40, but the public disclosure by President Roosevelt of the destroyers-for-bases deal led to the announcement the following day, September 4, 1940, of the America First Committee, which would become the strongest such group. In its announcement, the AFC advocated four basic principles:

- The United States must build an impregnable defense for America.
- No foreign power, nor group of powers, can successfully attack a prepared America.
- American democracy can be preserved only by keeping out of the European war.
- "Aid short of war" weakens national defense at home and threatens to involve America in war abroad.

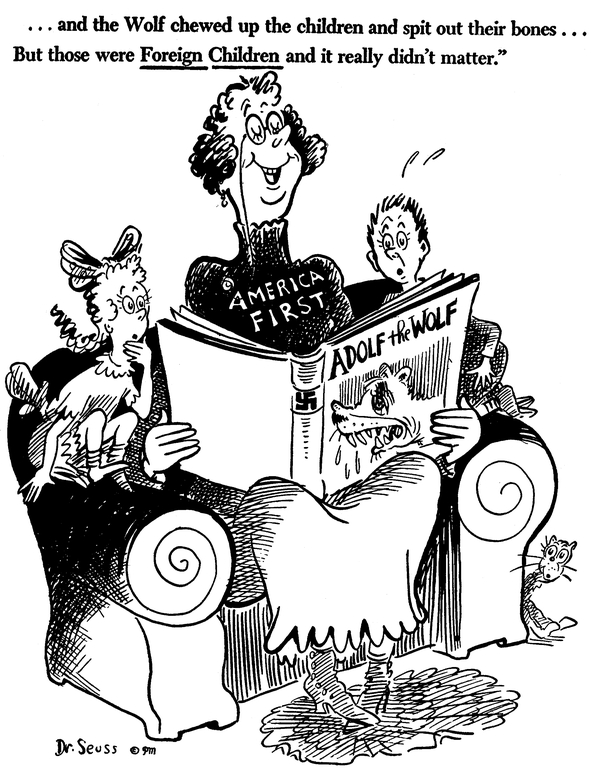
A Dr. Seuss editorial cartoon from early October 1941 criticizing America First

The America First Committee launched a petition aimed at enforcing the 1939 Neutrality Act and forcing President Franklin D. Roosevelt to keep his pledge to keep America out of the war. The committee profoundly distrusted Roosevelt, and argued that he was lying to the American people.

On January 11, 1941, the day after Roosevelt's Lend-Lease bill was submitted to the United States Congress, Wood promised AFC opposition "with all the vigor it can exert." America First staunchly opposed the convoying of ships involving the U.S. Navy, believing that any exchange of fire with German forces would likely pull the United States into the war. It also opposed the Atlantic Charter and the placing of economic pressure on Japan.

Consequently, America First objected to any material assistance to Britain, such as in destroyers-for-bases, that might drag the United States into the war and remained firm in its belief that Nazi Germany posed no military threat to the United States itself. The America First Committee was not a pacifist organization, however, and it based its beliefs around the aim that the United States would embody preparedness with a modern, mechanized army and a navy that would be strong in both the Atlantic and Pacific Oceans.

The principal pressure group opposing America First was the Committee to Defend America by Aiding the Allies, which argued that a German defeat of Britain would in fact endanger American security, and which argued that aiding the British would reduce, not increase, the likelihood of the United States being pulled into the war.

The Lend-Lease bill was debated fiercely in Congress for two months, and the America First Committee devoted its strength towards defeating it, but with the addition of a few amendments it was passed with solid margins in both houses of Congress and signed into law in March 1941. In the end, America First failed in all its efforts to prevent Roosevelt's increasingly close relationship with Britain and failed in its efforts to legislatively block Roosevelt's actions.

== Antisemitism, Lindbergh, and other extremists ==
"Seeking to brand itself as a mainstream organization, America First struggled with the problem of anti-Semitism of some of its leaders and many of its members", according to the historian Dunn. The group had some Jewish members at the outset: Sears heir and philanthropist Lessing J. Rosenwald was on the national committee; former California congresswoman Florence Prag Kahn was a member; and the first publicity director for the New York chapter was Jewish. However, the automotive pioneer and infamous antisemite Henry Ford had joined the national committee at the same time as Rosenwald, which soon led to Rosenwald resigning. In response, America First removed Ford from the national committee and also removed from it Avery Brundage, whose actions at the 1936 Berlin Olympics were associated with antisemitism. Attempts by America First to recruit other Jewish people to the national committee found no takers. As Dunn writes, "the problem of anti-Semitism remained; some chapter leaders spewed anti-Semitic accusations, while others invited anti-Semitic speakers to address their members." America First tried to keep some distance between itself and the popular radio priest and fascist sympathizer Father Coughlin.

The world-famous American aviator Charles Lindbergh was admired in Germany and was allowed to see the buildup of the German air force, the Luftwaffe, in 1937. He was impressed by its strength and secretly reported his findings to the General Staff of the United States Army, warning them that the U.S. had fallen behind and that it must urgently build up its aviation. Lindbergh, who had feuded with the Roosevelt administration for years, delivered his first radio speech on September 15, 1939, through all three major radio networks. Voicing his belief that people of Northern and Western European descent were the safeguards of civilization against Asia (which included the Soviet Union), his speech argued that instead of fighting, all of Europe and the United States should "defend the white race against foreign invasion".

For the first half of America First's 15 months of existence, the group and Lindbergh kept at arm's length from each other, as Stuart was leery of being too closely associated with some of the extreme views of Lindbergh's circle, while for his part the aviator preferred to act independently. Wood, however, wanted to bring Lindbergh on, and on April 10, 1941, it was agreed that Lindbergh would join the national committee, with the aviator's first rally appearance taking place on April 17 at the Chicago Arena.

Once he did join, Lindbergh became America First's most prominent speaker. His involvement significantly increased rally attendance and organization membership, but it also greatly increased the level of criticism that America First faced from interventionists and from the Roosevelt administration.

On June 20, 1941, Lindbergh spoke to 30,000 people in Los Angeles and billed it as a "Peace and Preparedness Mass Meeting". Lindbergh criticized the movements that he perceived were leading America into the war and proclaimed that the U.S. was in a position that made it virtually impregnable. He also claimed that the interventionists and the British who called for "the defense of England" really meant "the defeat of Germany."

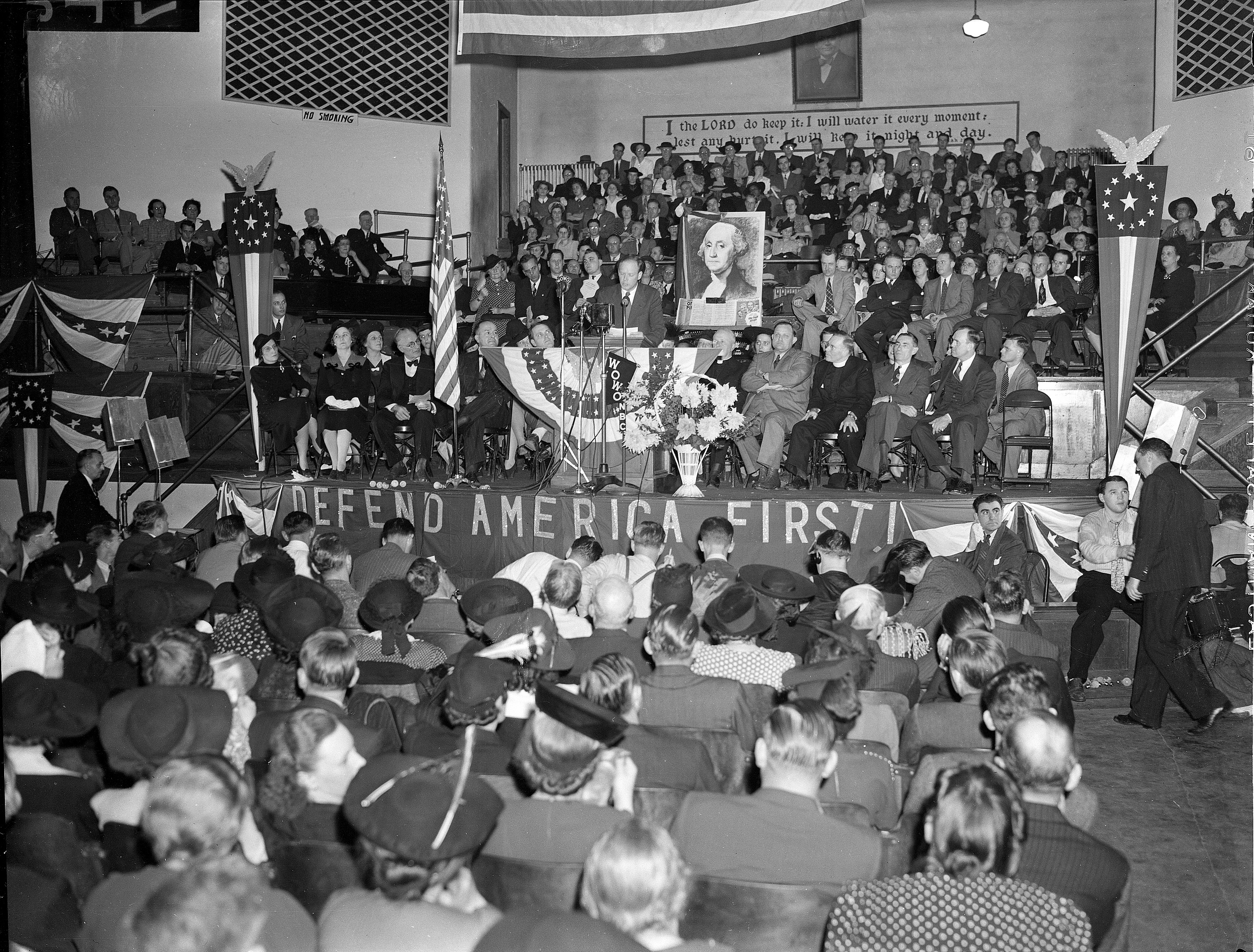
Charles Lindbergh speaking at an America First Committee rally in Fort Wayne, Indiana, in early October 1941

A speech that Lindbergh delivered to a rally in Des Moines, Iowa, on September 11, 1941, may have significantly raised tensions. He identified the forces pulling America into the war as the British, the Roosevelt administration, and American Jews. While he expressed sympathy for the plight of the Jews in Germany, he argued that America's entry into the war would serve them little better:

The persecution experienced by Jewish people in Germany accounts for their opposition to Nazi Germany and the opposition of those concerned with human rights. However, advocating for direct engagement in war presents potential risks for both the country and the Jewish community.

Those who resided in Germany at the time were faced with the possibility of war, for which there were proponents and detractors. The previous World War - WWI from 1914 to 1918 demonstrates the devastation the country and its people endured.

Many condemned the speech as antisemitic. Journalist Dorothy Thompson wrote for the New York Herald Tribune an opinion that many shared: "I am absolutely certain that Lindbergh is pro-Nazi." Republican presidential candidate Wendell Willkie criticized the speech as "the most un-American talk made in my time by any person of national reputation." In the end, Lindbergh's remarks hurt the cause of the isolationists.

During the period after Nazi Germany and the Soviet Union had signed the Molotov–Ribbentrop non-aggression pact, most American Communists were opposed to the United States entering World War II, and they tried to infiltrate or take over America First. After June 1941, when Hitler launched Operation Barbarossa, the invasion of the Soviet Union, they reversed positions and denounced the AFC as a Nazi front, a group infiltrated by German agents. Nazis also tried to use the committee. The aviator and orator Laura Ingalls' pro-Nazi rhetoric and straight-armed Nazi salutes on her America First speaking tour worried the group's leadership, but they allowed her to continue because of praise from local chapters where she had spoken. When Ingalls was arrested in December 1941 and put on trial for being an unregistered Nazi agent, the prosecution revealed that her handler, German diplomat Ulrich Freiherr von Gienanth, had encouraged her to participate in AFC activities. In addition to Ingalls, who was convicted, another America First speaker would be convicted for failing to register as a Japanese agent.

Various historians have described attempts to keep Nazi and fascist sympathizers out of its chapters as not always successful. Historian Alexander DeConde wrote, "Most of the America First supporters were middlewestern Republicans who distrusted the President for various reasons, but it was not a purely sectional organization or partisan political movement. Thousands of sincere Americans of varied background and from both political parties joined and contributed to it. It also attracted support from a number of fringe hate organizations, from antisemites, and from Nazi sympathizers. This minority support tarnished its reputation." Author Max Wallace argues that by the summer of 1941, "extremist elements had successfully hijacked the movement".

== After Pearl Harbor ==
After the attack on Pearl Harbor on December 7, AFC canceled a rally with Lindbergh at Boston Garden "in view of recent critical developments," and the organization's leaders announced their support of the war effort. Lindbergh gave this rationale:

We have been stepping closer to war for many months. Now it has come and we must meet it as united Americans regardless of our attitude in the past toward the policy our government has followed. Whether or not that policy has been wise, our country has been attacked by force of arms and by force of arms we must retaliate. Our own defenses and our own military position have already been neglected too long. We must now turn every effort to building the greatest and most efficient Army, Navy and Air Force in the world. When American soldiers go to war it must be with the best equipment that modern skill can design and that modern industry can build.

With the formal declaration of war against Japan, the organization chose to disband. On December 11, the committee leaders met and voted for dissolution, the same day upon which Nazi Germany and Fascist Italy declared war on the United States. In a statement released to the press, the AFC wrote:

Our principles were right. Had they been followed, war could have been avoided. No good purpose can now be served by considering what might have been, had our objectives been attained. We are at war. Today, though there may be many important subsidiary considerations, the primary objective is not difficult to state. It can be completely defined in one word: Victory.

Once war was declared, the national leaders of the America First Committee supported the United States war effort, with many serving in some capacity. Similarly, many of the leaders of local chapters volunteered for service in the U.S. armed forces; a few continued to involve themselves in anti-war actions.

== Legacy ==
In 1983, after his time as president of Yale had concluded, Brewster said he was glad that he and the other isolationists had failed. He also acknowledged that, consciously or not, there was antisemitism among the elites at Yale during that period. Asked in a 2000 interview whether the leading members of the America First Committee had ever staged a reunion after the war, founder Stuart said, "No, we did not. We may be a little sensitive to the fact that the world still thinks we're the bad guys."

Paleoconservative commentator Pat Buchanan has praised America First and used its name as a slogan. "The achievements of that organization are monumental," wrote Buchanan in 2004. "By keeping America out of World War II until Hitler attacked Stalin in June 1941, Soviet Russia, not America, bore the brunt of the fighting, bleeding and dying to defeat Nazi Germany." Historian Wayne S. Cole concludes that while the America First Committee did not actually defeat any Roosevelt administration proposal in Congress, it made the margins of several such actions smaller than they would have been otherwise; and that throughout 1941, Roosevelt was constrained in his actions in support of Britain due to isolationist pressures in public opinion that America First did the most to mobilize.

The re-use of the "America First" phrase by Donald Trump in the 2016 United States presidential election led to a look back at the America First Committee through the filter of contemporary events. This included views on the level of extremism found in the 1940–41 movement as well as analysis of whether the new Trump administration was isolationist in the same sense.

== See also ==
- America First Party (1943)
- German American Bund
- It Can't Happen Here
- John Birch Society
- List of anti-war organizations
