= Burton Benedict =

American anthropologist

- Born: May 20, 1923; Baltimore, Maryland
- Died: September 19, 2010 (aged 87); Berkeley, California
- Education: Harvard University, London School of Economics
- Spouse: Marion Benedict (m. 1950)
- Scientific career
- Fields: Anthropology

Burton Benedict (May 20, 1923 – September 19, 2010) was an American anthropologist. He interrupted his studies at Harvard University to serve in the United States Army Air Forces during World War II. After graduation he studied for a doctorate at the London School of Economics and afterwards carried out field work with the university and McGill University in Mauritius and the Seychelles. He joined the University of California, Berkeley, in 1968 and spent the rest of his career there, rising to dean of social sciences. He was made director of the university's Lowie Museum of Anthropology and was responsible for securing additional funding from the William Randolph Hearst Foundation. He was director when the museum was renamed after one of its founders Phoebe Apperson Hearst. After retirement in 1994 he continued to volunteer at the museum and at the Oakland Zoo.

== Early life ==
Burton Benedict was born in Baltimore, Maryland on May 20, 1923. He was the son of a Hollywood producer and publicist. As a child Benedict had an interest in ornithology, read Shakespeare and watched many British films. He enrolled at Harvard University to study ornithology but interrupted his studies to join the United States Army Air Forces during World War II. Benedict was deployed to New Mexico, where he interacted with the Pueblo Indians, sparking an interest in anthropology. After the war he returned to Harvard and switched his focus to anthropology. Among his classmates were Gregory Bateson and Florence Rockwood (Kluckhohn). Benedict graduated with a Bachelor of Arts degree in anthropology 1949.

== African field work ==
After graduation Benedict, who described himself as a "terrific anglophile", went to the United Kingdom to study for a doctor of philosophy degree at the London School of Economics (LSE). While there he worked with Edmund Leach, Maurice Freedman and Raymond Firth. Benedict's thesis was a study of Muslim and Buddhist associations in London but he also carried out field work with the Indian community in Mauritius from 1955 to 1957, funded by the Colonial Social Science Research Council. He spent a year as a senior research fellow at the Institute of Islamic Studies of McGill University in Montreal, Canada, before returning to the LSE in 1958 as an assistant lecturer in social anthropology. Benedict visited the Seychelles in 1960 to carry out field work. He wrote the books Indians in a Plural Society (published 1961); Mauritius: the Problems of a Plural Society (1965) and People of the Seychelles (1966).

== Berkeley ==
Benedict was promoted to lecturer and then senior lecturer before leaving the LSE in 1968 to return to the United States as professor of anthropology at the University of California, Berkeley. He had worked at Berkeley as a visiting professor from 1966 to 1967. Benedict initially worked in the university's South Asian studies programme but later collaborated with William Shack and Elizabeth Colson on Berkeley's nascent British social anthropology programme. Benedict served as chair of the Department of Anthropology from 1970 to 1971 when he was appointed Berkeley's first dean of social sciences. He held the position until 1974 and during this time established the Sherwood L. Washburn laboratories for the teaching of physical anthropology. Benedict had a seat on Berkeley's budget committee from 1978 to 1981 and, during his last year, served as chair.

In 1982 he co-authored Men, Women and Money in Seychelles: Two Views with his wife Marion, whom he had married in 1950. The Berkeley News described the work as "groundbreaking" in the field of ethnography and called it a must read for anthropology students. Also in 1982 he put on an exhibition at the university's Lowie Museum of Anthropology about the 1915 Panama–Pacific International Exposition, which he described as "the last naïve view of a brighter and better world". The exhibition was one of the most successful in the museum's history and he afterwards wrote The Anthropology of World’s Fairs: San Francisco’s Panama Pacific International Exposition of 1915 (1983) which described the fair and also contained a study of all world's fairs from the 1851 Great Exhibition to the Expo '70 in Osaka, Japan. In 1984 he wrote, produced and narrated The 1915 Panama Pacific Fair which won that year's Western Heritage Award for best television documentary.

== Hearst museum ==
Benedict was appointed associate director of the museum in 1984, acting director in 1988 and director in 1989. In this role he transformed the museum, which had previously suffered from underfunding, by securing additional capital from the William Randolph Hearst Foundation. Benedict was also director when the museum was renamed the Phoebe A. Hearst Museum of Anthropology after Phoebe Apperson Hearst, William Randolph Hearst's mother and a 1901 founder of the museum. In 1991 he put on an exhibition about money and in the same year was awarded the Berkeley Citation, the campus' highest award. Benedict retired from the university in 1994 but continued to be involved with the museum as a volunteer museum docent. He was also a trustee of Oakland Zoo where, in 2000, he put on an exhibition on early hominids. In 2004 he taught a course on museum anthropology for the Osher Lifelong Learning Institutes. Benedict also maintained a collection of Indian and African figurines, Native American and World's Fair artifacts.

== Personal life ==
Burton Benedict married Marion MacColl Steuber. They had two daughters, Helen and Barbara who are both also university professors and authors. He died of heart failure at his home in Berkeley on September 19, 2010.
