= Charles Benedict =

Charles Benedict may refer to:

- Charles Benedict (sport shooter) (1867–1952), American sport shooter who competed in the 1908 Summer Olympics
- Charles B. Benedict (1828–1901), U.S. Representative from New York 31st District, 1877–79
- Charles L. Benedict (1824–1901), American lawyer, assemblyman, and judge
- Chuck Benedict (born 1946), American Democratic politician from Wisconsin

== See also ==
- Charles Benedict Davenport (1866–1944), prominent American eugenicist and biologist
- Charles Benedict Calvert (1808–1864), American politician from Maryland
- Charles Benedict Driscoll (1885–1951), American editor
