= What Is the Best Work of American Fiction of the Last 25 Years? =

2006 poll of writers

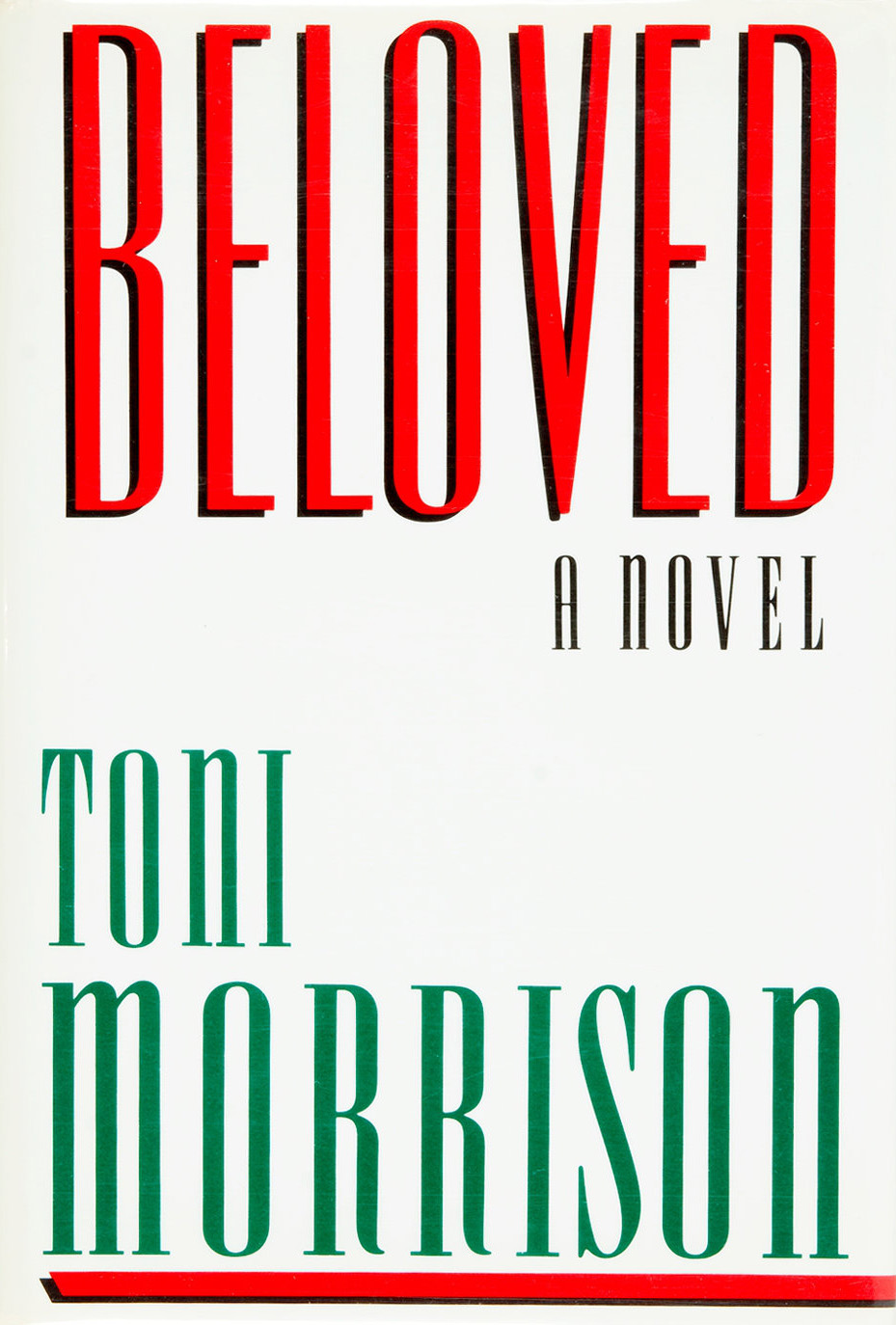
Beloved (1987) received the most votes in the poll.

"What Is the Best Work of American Fiction of the Last 25 Years?" is an informal opinion poll conducted in 2006 by the New York Times Book Review (NYTBR) to determine "the single best work of American fiction published in the last 25 years." Eligible works were those written by an American author and published during the quarter-century period from 1980 through 2005. The poll was conducted by NYTBR editor Sam Tanenhaus, who sent letters to literary figures requesting their participation and received 124 responses. The results were published on May 21, 2006, in the Sunday edition of the New York Times. An essay by A. O. Scott, titled "In Search of the Best", reflected on the results and the premise of the "Great American Novel".

Toni Morrison's 1987 novel Beloved received the most votes, a result that had been anticipated by Tanenhaus, Scott, and several poll participants. The runners-up were the novels Underworld (1997) by Don DeLillo; a tie for third place between Blood Meridian (1985) by Cormac McCarthy and Rabbit Angstrom: A Tetralogy (1995) by John Updike; and American Pastoral (1997) by Philip Roth. The full list featured another 17 works that garnered at least two votes; some books with only one vote were later identified in other sources. Works by Roth received more total votes than those by any other author.

The poll spurred vigorous debate and a wide range of commentary on the status of an American literary canon. Critics of the poll found its results to be unrepresentative of the breadth of contemporary American literature, noting apparent biases against—for example—women's writing, regionalist literature, or genre fiction. Taking inspiration from the exercise, The Observer conducted its own poll for the best novel published during the same timespan by a writer from Britain, Ireland, or the Commonwealth, with J. M. Coetzee's Disgrace (1999) emerging as the winner.

== Poll ==
=== Results ===
In early 2006, Tanenhaus sent a letter "to a couple of hundred prominent writers, critics, editors and other literary sages" requesting participation in the poll. Participants were invited to submit their single choice for the best work of American fiction from 1980 to 2005; submissions with more than one selection or ranked lists were not accepted. The NYTBR offered poll respondents "confidentiality, though not anonymity", in that it would publish the names of those who participated in the poll while maintaining the secrecy of ballots.

The poll results were announced on May 18, 2006, ahead of the BookExpo America trade fair in Washington, D.C., before appearing in print on May 21. That week's edition of the NYTBR was exclusively devoted to fiction works, and the magazine's cover illustration features the cover art of 22 books from the poll results. The published results included the winner, four runners-up, and 17 works of literature that received at least two votes. Beloved by Toni Morrison received the most votes. The list as published did not reveal who voted for any given work, nor did it provide the number of votes received by a given work. However, Scott's accompanying essay provided the tallies of votes received by the top five works, as well as noting that works by Philip Roth had received more total votes than those by any other author, with 21 votes overall spread across seven novels (six of which received multiple votes).

Gallery of winning author and runners-up

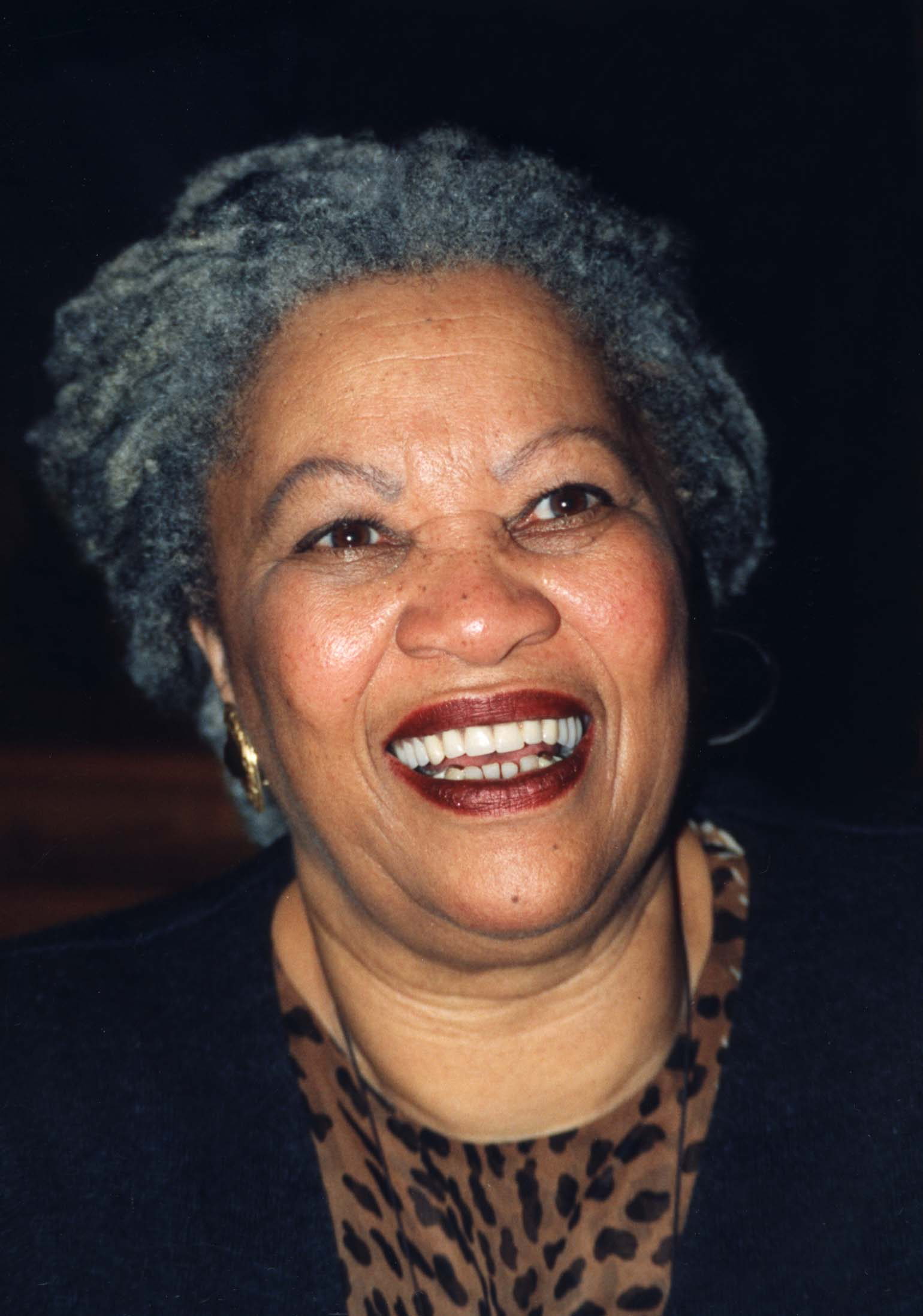
Toni Morrison
(1931–2019)

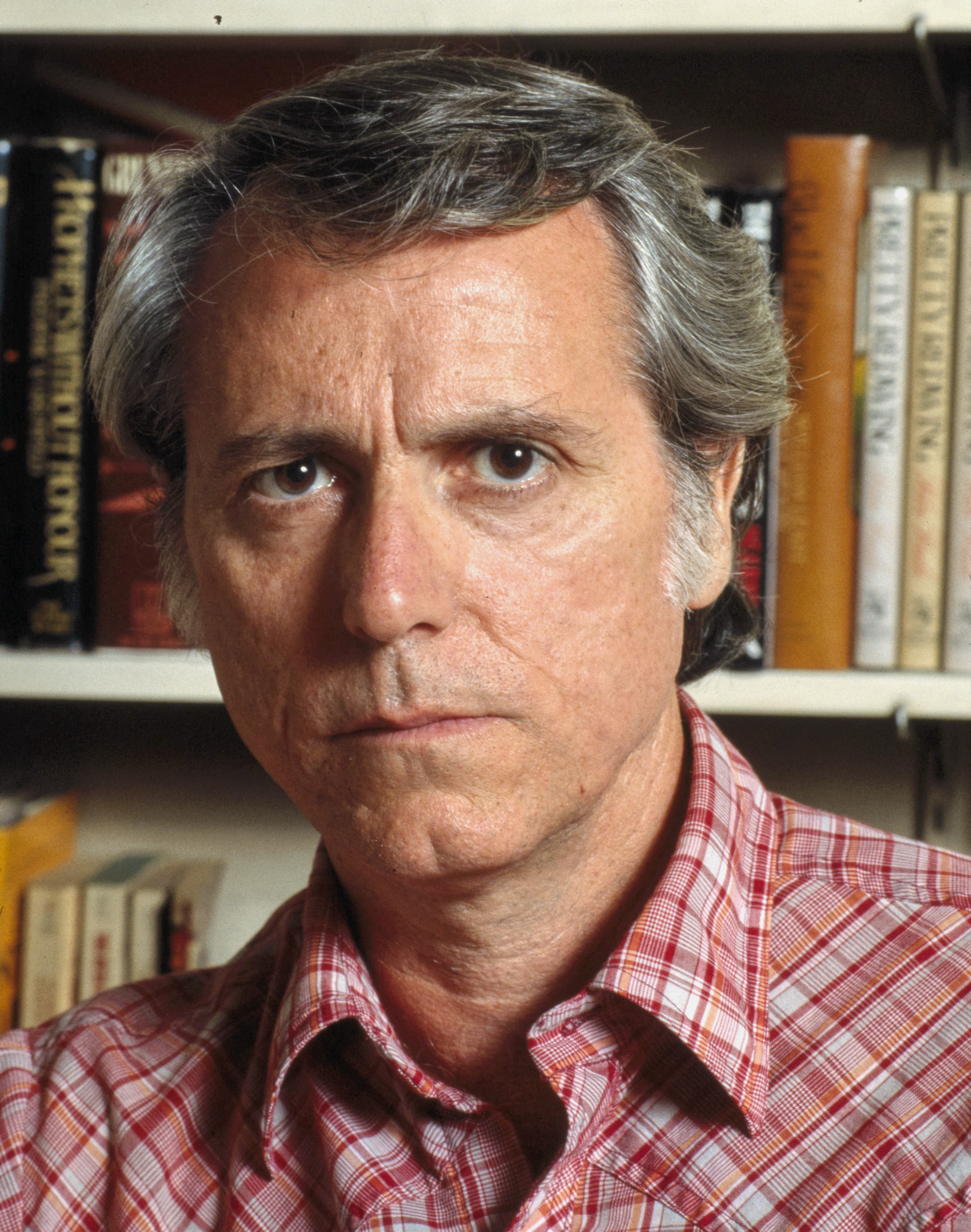
Don DeLillo
(1936–)

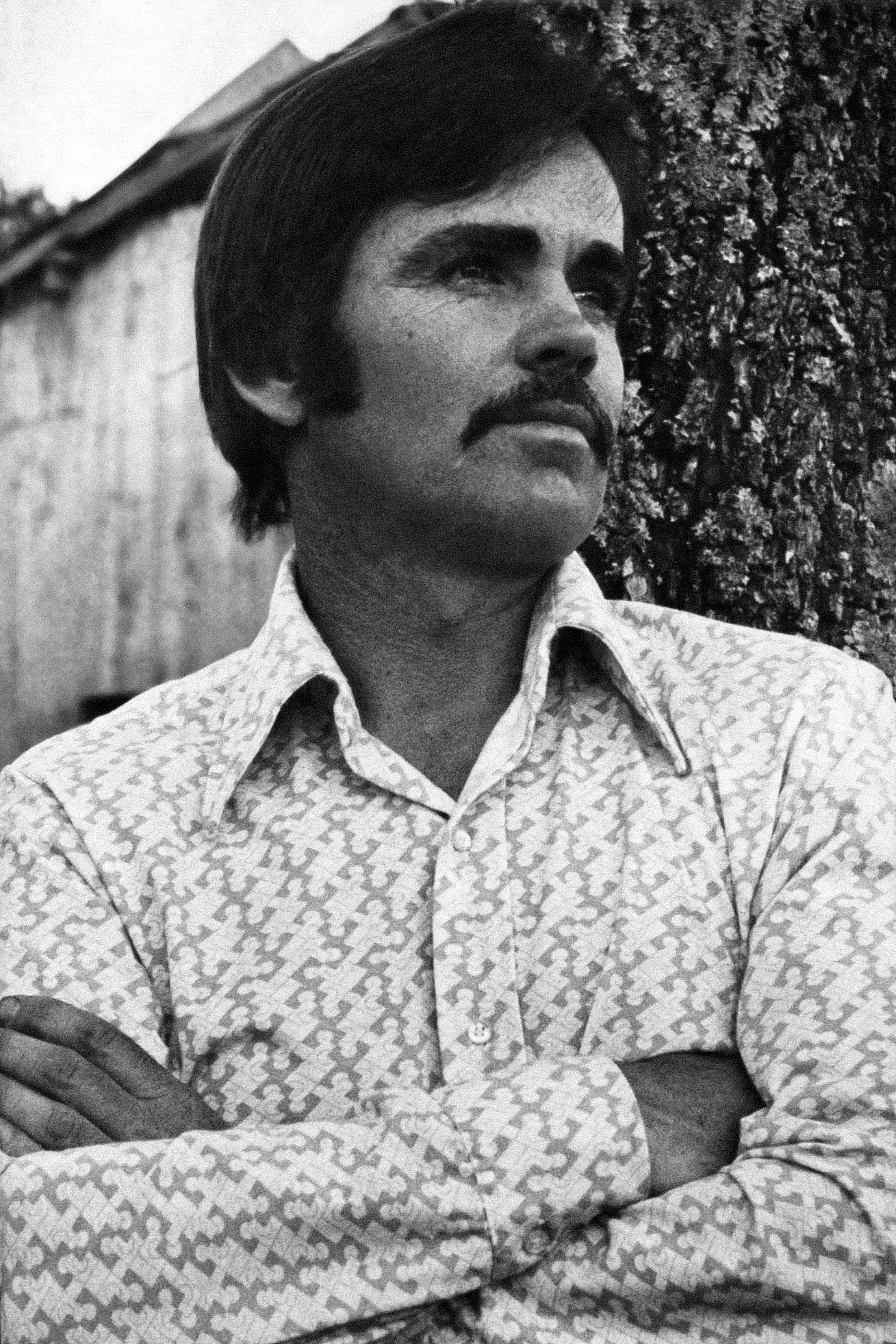
Cormac McCarthy
(1933–2023)

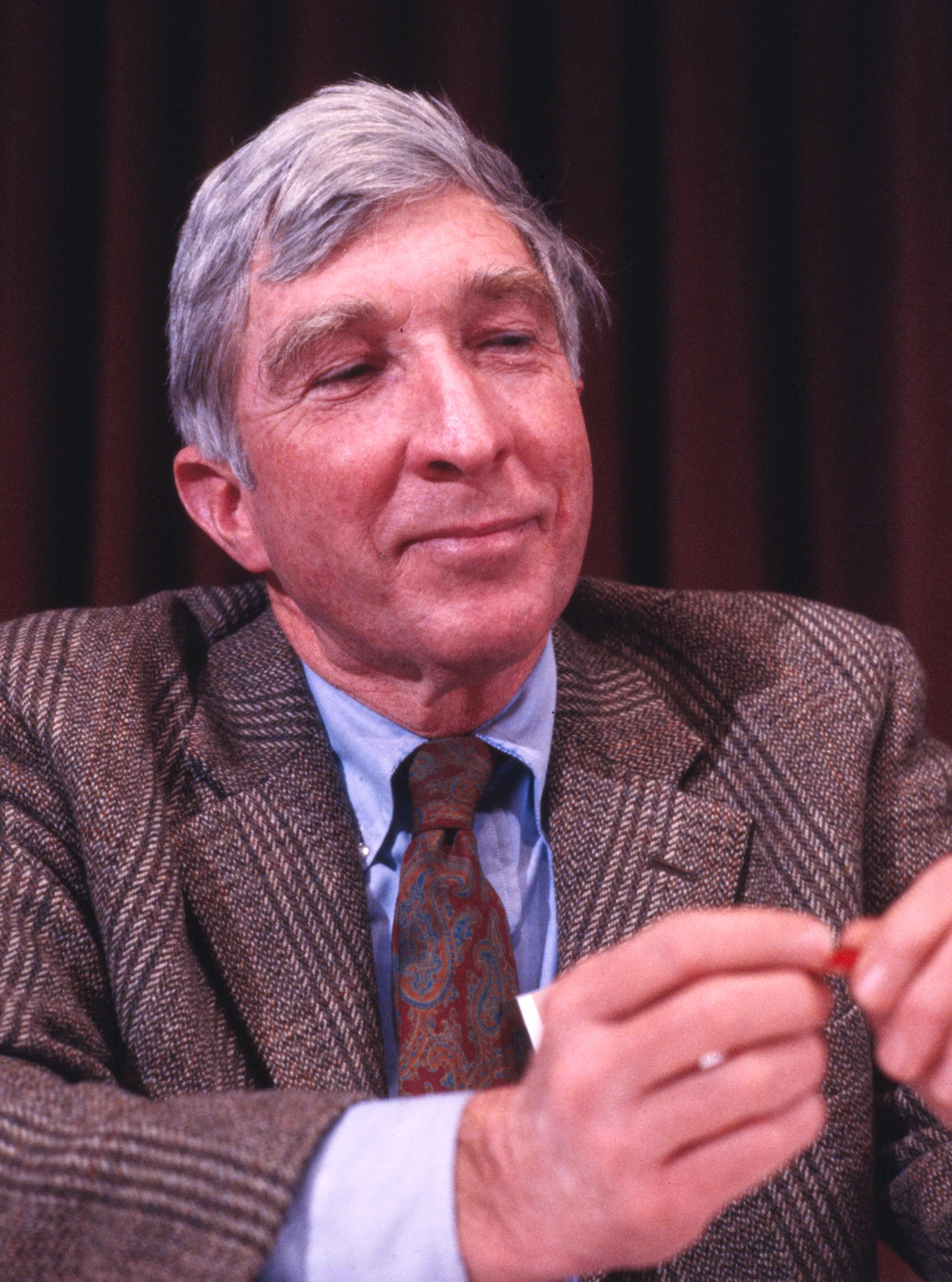
John Updike
(1932–2009)

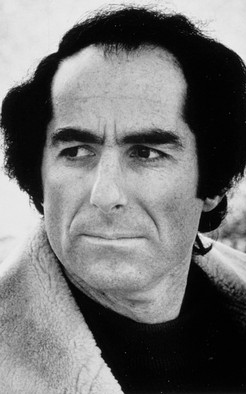
Philip Roth
(1933–2018)

After the poll results were published, the National Book Critics Circle (NBCC) contacted poll respondents and were able to identify some works receiving a single vote. The list below includes the results published in the NYTBR plus any works known to have received only a single vote.

"What Is the Best Work of American Fiction of the Last 25 Years?" results
Rank	Votes	Title	Year	Author	Ref.
1	15	Beloved	1987	Toni Morrison	
2	11	Underworld	1997	Don DeLillo	
3	8	Blood Meridian	1985	Cormac McCarthy	
3	8	Rabbit Angstrom: A Tetralogy (Everyman's Library, No. 214): Rabbit, Run (1960); Rabbit Redux (1971); Rabbit Is Rich (1981); Rabbit at Rest (1990)	1995	John Updike	
5	7	American Pastoral	1997	Philip Roth	
6	2–6	"Where I'm Calling From"	1988	Raymond Carver	
6	2–6	White Noise	1985	Don DeLillo	
6	2–6	Libra	1988	Don DeLillo	
6	2–6	Independence Day	1995	Richard Ford	
6	2–6	Winter's Tale	1983	Mark Helprin	
6	2–6	Jesus' Son	1992	Denis Johnson	
6	2–6	The Known World	2003	Edward P. Jones	
6	2–6	The Border Trilogy: All the Pretty Horses (1992); The Crossing (1994); Cities of the Plain (1998)	1999	Cormac McCarthy	
6	2–6	The Things They Carried	1990	Tim O'Brien	
6	2–6	Housekeeping	1980	Marilynne Robinson	
6	2–6	The Counterlife	1986	Philip Roth	
6	2–6	Operation Shylock	1993	Philip Roth	
6	2–6	Sabbath's Theater	1995	Philip Roth	
6	2–6	The Human Stain	2000	Philip Roth	
6	2–6	The Plot Against America	2004	Philip Roth	
6	2–6	Mating	1991	Norman Rush	
6	2–6	A Confederacy of Dunces	1980	John Kennedy Toole	
23 (Note: Works that received only one vote in the poll were not included or "ranked" on the original list as published by the New York Times Book Review. These works are only known, if at all, via secondary sources.)	1	Sixty Stories	1981	Donald Barthelme	
23	1	Wonder Boys	1995	Michael Chabon	
23	1	The Amazing Adventures of Kavalier & Clay	2000	Michael Chabon	
23	1	Little, Big	1981	John Crowley	
23	1	The Hours	1998	Michael Cunningham	
23	1	The Corrections	2001	Jonathan Franzen	
23	1	Carpenter's Gothic	1985	William Gaddis	
23	1	The Cider House Rules	1985	John Irving	
23	1	Ironweed	1983	William Kennedy	
23	1	The Collected Stories	1994	Grace Paley	
23	1	Unknown (Note: A. O. Scott notes there was "a single vote for Richard Powers" in his essay accompanying the poll results, but he did not provide the title of whichever work by Powers received that vote.)	—N/a	Richard Powers	
23	1	On Glory's Course	1984	James Purdy	
23	1	I Married a Communist	1998	Philip Roth	
23	1	Collected Stories (Library of America, Nos. 149–151)	2004	Isaac Bashevis Singer	
23	1	Aberration of Starlight	1980	Gilbert Sorrentino	
23	1	Dinner at the Homesick Restaurant	1982	Anne Tyler	

Raw data

Raw data

Raw data

=== Participants ===
The names of 124 poll respondents were printed in the NYTBR. Although the NYTBR did not reveal any voter's selection, several respondents chose to publicly disclose the title of the work for which they cast their vote after the list was published. If known, a participant's poll response is provided below in a footnote.

- Kurt Andersen
- Roger Angell
- A. Manette Ansay
- James Atlas
- Russell Banks
- John Banville
- Julian Barnes
- Andrea Barrett
- Rick Bass
- Ann Beattie
- Madison Smartt Bell
- Aimee Bender
- Paul Berman
- Sven Birkerts
- Harold Bloom
- Bill Buford
- Ethan Canin
- Philip Caputo
- Michael Chabon
- Susan Choi
- Mark Costello
- Michael Cunningham (Note: Cunningham voted for White Noise (1985) by Don DeLillo.)
- Edwidge Danticat
- Don DeLillo
- Pete Dexter
- Junot Díaz
- Morris Dickstein (Note: Dickstein voted for Sabbath's Theater (1995) by Philip Roth.)
- Andre Dubus III
- Tony Earley
- Richard Eder
- Jennifer Egan
- Dave Eggers
- Lucy Ellmann
- Nathan Englander
- Louise Erdrich
- Anne Fadiman
- Henry Finder
- Jonathan Safran Foer
- Paula Fox (Note: Fox voted for On Glory's Course (1984) by James Purdy.)
- Nell Freudenberger
- Carlos Fuentes
- David Gates
- Henry Louis Gates Jr.
- Julia Glass
- Nadine Gordimer
- Mary Gordon
- Robert Gottlieb
- Philip Gourevitch
- Elizabeth Graver
- Andrew Sean Greer (Note: Greer voted for The Amazing Adventures of Kavalier & Clay (2000) by Michael Chabon.)
- Allan Gurganus
- Jim Harrison
- Kathryn Harrison
- Alice Hoffman
- A. M. Homes
- Maureen Howard
- John Irving (Note: Irving voted for his own novel, The Cider House Rules (1985). "I voted for myself," Irving said, "suspecting that, otherwise, I might not receive a single vote. We all know presidents vote for themselves, and they do far more harm than writers do.")
- Ha Jin
- Thom Jones
- Heidi Julavits
- Ward Just
- Mary Karr (Note: Karr voted for Blood Meridian (1985) by Cormac McCarthy.)
- William Kennedy
- Frank Kermode
- Stephen King
- Maxine Hong Kingston
- Walter Kirn
- Benjamin Kunkel
- David Leavitt
- Chang-Rae Lee
- Brad Leithauser
- Frank Lentricchia
- John Leonard
- Jonathan Lethem
- Alan Lightman
- David Lodge
- Ralph Lombreglia
- Phillip Lopate
- Janet Malcolm
- Thomas Mallon (Note: Mallon voted for Underworld (1997) by Don DeLillo.)
- Ben Marcus
- Peter Matthiessen
- Ian McEwan
- David Means
- Daphne Merkin
- Stephen Metcalf (Note: Metcalf voted for Underworld (1997) by Don DeLillo.)
- Rick Moody (Note: Moody voted for The Collected Stories (1994) by Grace Paley.)
- Lorrie Moore
- Geoffrey O'Brien (Note: O'Brien voted for Aberration of Starlight (1980) by Gilbert Sorrentino.)
- Chris Offutt
- Stewart O'Nan
- David Orr (Note: Orr voted for Little, Big (1981) by John Crowley.)
- Cynthia Ozick
- Ann Patchett
- Tom Perrotta
- Richard Gid Powers
- William Pritchard
- Francine Prose
- Terrence Rafferty
- Marilynne Robinson
- Roxana Robinson (Note: Roxana Robinson voted for The Hours (1998) by Michael Cunningham.)
- Norman Rush (Note: Rush voted for the Library of America's three-volume edition of Collected Stories (2004) by Isaac Bashevis Singer.)
- Richard Russo
- George Saunders
- Liesl Schillinger
- Joanna Scott
- Jim Shepard
- Karen Shepard
- David Shields
- Gary Shteyngart
- Lee Siegel
- Curtis Sittenfeld (Note: Sittenfeld voted for White Noise (1985) by Don DeLillo.)
- Jane Smiley (Note: Smiley voted for Beloved (1987) by Toni Morrison.)
- Wole Soyinka
- Scott Spencer
- William Styron
- Studs Terkel
- Deborah Treisman
- Anne Tyler
- Mario Vargas Llosa
- William T. Vollmann
- Edmund White (Note: White voted for Wonder Boys (1995) by Michael Chabon.)
- Tom Wolfe
- Tobias Wolff

The following people were among those who had been invited to participate in the poll, but ultimately declined to respond:

- Laura Miller
- Meghan O'Rourke

== Response ==
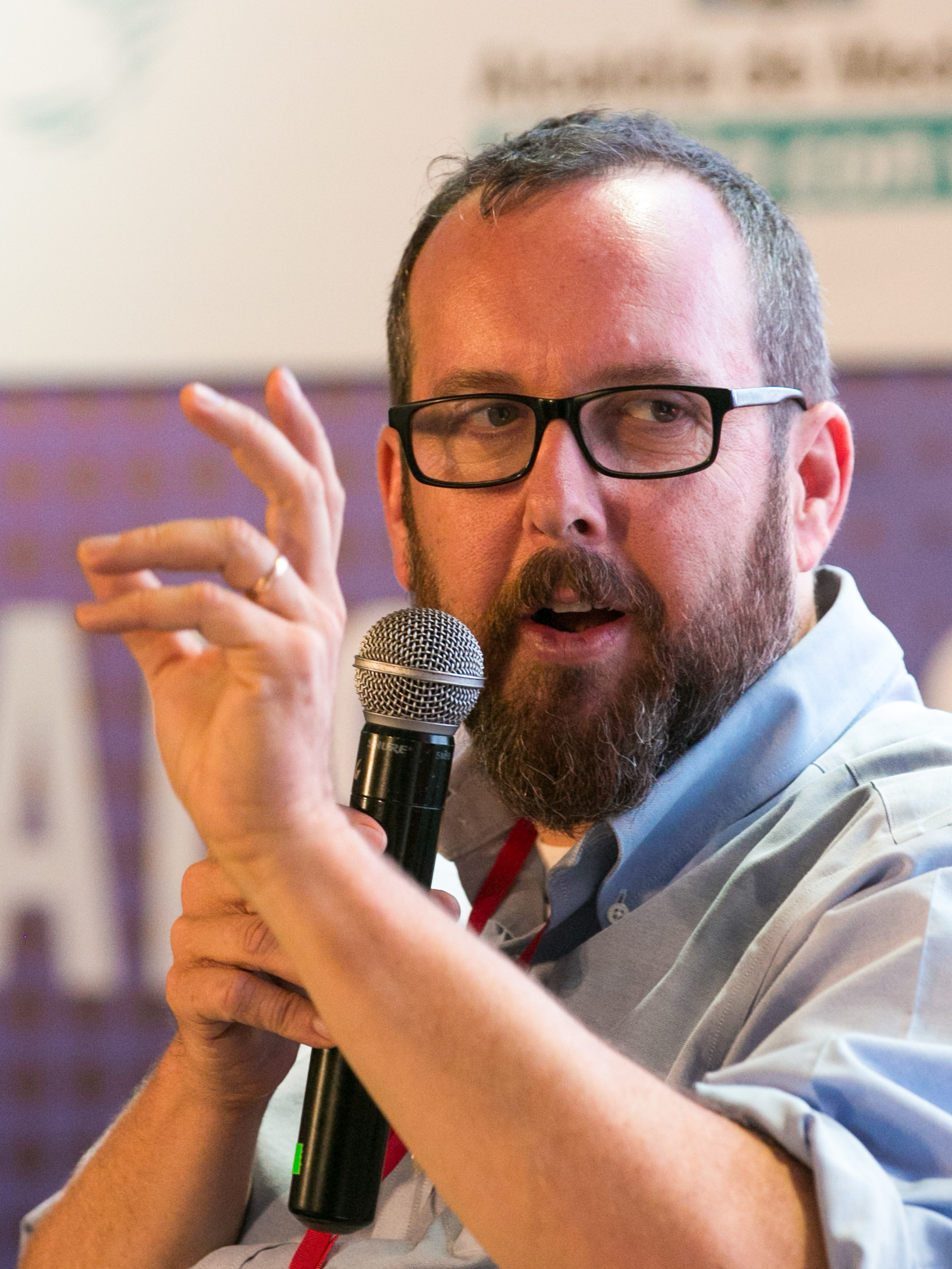
New York Times critic A. O. Scott wrote an essay to accompany the poll results.

The eventual victory of Beloved did not come as a shock to Times staffers who were involved with the project. "It's a very controversial book and a controversial choice," Tanenhaus said in an interview with Book TV, "although not altogether surprising. And in fact, we heard from a few voters who predicted Beloved would win—even as they cast votes for other books." In his essay accompanying the poll, titled "In Search of the Best", A. O. Scott wrote, "[t]he results—in some respects quite surprising, in others not at all—provide a rich, if partial and unscientific, picture of the state of American literature, a kind of composite self-portrait as interesting perhaps for its blind spots and distortions as for its details." Of the poll winner, Beloved, Scott said:

Any other outcome would have been startling, since Morrison's novel has inserted itself into the American canon more completely than any of its potential rivals. With remarkable speed, Beloved has, less than 20 years after its publication, become a staple of the college literary curriculum, which is to say a classic. This triumph is commensurate with its ambition, since it was Morrison's intention in writing it precisely to expand the range of classic American literature, to enter, as a living black woman, the company of dead white males like Faulkner, Melville, Hawthorne and Twain.

A year after the poll's publication, Lawrence Buell remarked that it had "occasioned an amazing amount of comment" on the topic of the Great American Novel. Sara Nelson, then editor-in-chief of Publishers Weekly, wrote of the poll: "There's no doubt about it: I envy Tanenhaus this publicity—and perhaps advertising-generating vehicle, even if he does say that the winning publishers have not been alerted in advance, à la Oprah, and therefore are unlikely to buy extra ads in the issue. Cash investment or no, to be named the New York Times Book Review's best fiction of the last 25 years has to be a brand-builder for both the winner and its bestower." The poll has been cited as a prominent example of the influence of the media on the construction of literary canons, alongside other institutional influences such as academia, governmental agencies, nonprofit organizations, libraries, and publishing companies.

On May 22, 2006, the public radio show Open Source, hosted by Christopher Lydon, invited literary critics James Wood, Mark Greif, Ruth Franklin, and Dennis Loy Johnson to discuss and analyze the poll results. The 2010 conference of the American Literature Association (ALA) hosted a panel discussion on the poll results, with one panelist representing the literary society of each of the top five authors in the poll as follows: Marni Gauthier (of the DeLillo Society), Steven Frye (of the McCarthy Society), Yvonne Atkinson (of the Morrison Society), David Brauner (of the Roth Society), and Marshall Boswell (of the Updike Society).

Taking inspiration from the NYTBR poll, British newspaper The Observer conducted its own poll of 150 "literary luminaries" seeking their choice of the "best British, Irish or Commonwealth novel" published between 1980 and 2005. Disgrace, the 1999 novel by South African–Australian author J. M. Coetzee, received the most votes in The Observer's poll. Comparing Disgrace and Beloved in an article for the Journal of Narrative Theory, Molly Abel Travis wrote: "What these two novels have in common, besides being profound and beautifully written narratives by Nobel laureates, is that they confront historical traumas and foreground the contested relationship between empathy and ethics through narrative distancing."

=== Criticism and analysis ===
Laura Miller declined to participate in the poll, citing her dislike for the trend of hierarchically ranking "classic books". In a piece for Salon.com, Miller wrote:

I've always disliked the "greatness sweepstakes" view of literature. Every conversation I've ever witnessed about which works or writers are "truly great" has smacked of philistinism ... Ultimately, novels are so diverse that once they attain a certain level of quality, they really can't be meaningfully ranked against one another. Pride and Prejudice and Crime and Punishment are both excellent, but very different, books, and the idea that we can decide which is better—or "greater"—is fundamentally absurd. ... I realize that people—or some people—will always feel profoundly uncomfortable with the idea that some fields of excellence can't be as minutely broken down as the NCAA rankings. But get used to it.

Most critiques of the poll addressed its perceived failures to represent the full diversity of American fiction, based on criteria such as authorial identity, literary genre, or geographic origin. Lev Grossman of Time magazine called the poll results "aggressively boring" and said "it's a very staid, predictable, old, white (except for Morrison and Jones), and male (except for Morrison and Marilynne Robinson's Housekeeping) bunch. No surprise extra-canonical incursions. (No William Gibson? No Watchmen?)" Poet and critic Ron Silliman criticized the list for its narrow selection of authors, and particularly its gender inequality, with only two works written by women receiving more than one vote. Silliman asked, "Do we really think that more than one fourth of all the important novels over the past quarter century were written by one man? If so, do we honestly think they were written by Philip Roth? I'd poke my eyes out before I'd live on that planet." Silliman suggested that Tanenhaus and the poll respondents "should both get out more, venturing further north than Connecticut, further west than Riverside Drive, further south than Gramercy Park. It wouldn't hurt to meet women." Susan Straight lodged a similar complaint in the Los Angeles Times, in which she criticized the poll's evident bias toward authors from the East Coast, particularly New York, to the detriment of writers from the Western United States and the geographically diverse traditions of American literary regionalism.

The victory of Beloved attracted criticism from British journalist Harry Mount in an article for The Daily Telegraph quoting two pundits, who judged the novel to be undeserving of such acclaim on the merits and accused the respondents of politicizing the poll. Melik Kaylan, then a journalist for The Wall Street Journal, said he was "flabbergasted" at the number-one ranking of Beloved and said it "shows a political process at work, both in terms of who writers feel they ought to vote for because of political correctness, but also who they wouldn't want voted above them." Conservative commentator Roger Kimball called Morrison "the perfect New York Times poster girl ... Someone whose opinions and skin colour immunise her from criticism and whose cliché-riddled, melodramatic prose impart a hungry urgency to the tired Left-liberal yearnings of the paper's cultural commissars. Pathetic, but wholly typical." Following Morrison's death in 2019, Tessa Roynon of the Australian Broadcasting Corporation referenced Mount's article as a "depressingly predictable" instance of backlash to Morrison's fiction.

Other assessments of the poll from a political lens were less negative. Benjamin Nugent observed that the overwhelming majority of authors represented in the poll were broadly aligned with political liberalism: Mark Helprin stood as the only outspoken conservative to make the list (alongside Cormac McCarthy, whose political attitudes were more closely guarded and ambiguous). However, Nugent's observation was not a criticism per se, given that the ideological composition of the poll reflected the conspicuous scarcity of openly conservative authors within the American literary fiction community overall. Bryan M. Santin used the poll to compare the critical fortunes of Beloved and another 1987 novel, Tom Wolfe's The Bonfire of the Vanities; the former had generally been celebrated by liberals, while the latter was more often championed by conservatives. For Santin, the Times poll—which did not register a single vote for Bonfire—served as evidence "that Beloved had become a canonical text and Bonfire had not," thwarting conservative predictions that the prestige of Wolfe's book would endure in the long term.

=== Reactions from authors named in the poll results ===
John Updike encountered the poll results shortly after their announcement at BookExpo America, where he was promoting his latest novel, Terrorist. His reaction to the list was observed in real time by Patti Thorn of Rocky Mountain News, who reported he "breathed a sigh of relief" when he saw his name on the list at third place. "Sometime later," he told Thorn, "you wonder why these other books came first." He continued, "I feel awkward about any award. [These polls turn] literature into a kind of track meet, where you can judge first, second and third ... I wonder if the discontent it breeds doesn't offset the joy of the winners."

Michael Cunningham—a participant in the poll himself, whose own novel The Hours also received a single vote from a fellow author—praised the poll's top five novels for capturing a sense of the zeitgeist when taken as an aggregate whole. Cunningham then emphasized the difference between the criteria to name a greatest book of its time versus the personal criteria to name a favorite book. For example, he said he regarded Nicholson Baker's 1988 novel The Mezzanine as not just a personal favorite, but a book he would recommend to an English-literate extraterrestrial lifeform to "convey a sense of American life right now"; nevertheless, he deemed The Mezzanine too unusual, too experimental, and too radical in its modernist style to qualify, in his view, as a definitive "best" book representing its era.

== Sources ==
- Cowles, Gregory; Smiley, Jane; Metcalf, Stephen; Cunningham, Michael; Dickstein, Morris (May 21, 2006). "Fiction in the Last 25 Years: A Discussion". The New York Times Book Review. The New York Times Company. Archived from the original on March 9, 2021.
- Dodson, Angela P. (July–August 2006). "Beloved Beloved". Black Issues Book Review. 8 (4). New York: Target Market News, Inc.: 2. ProQuest 217766330.
- Editors of the New York Times Book Review (May 21, 2006). "Up Front". The New York Times Book Review. The New York Times Company. p. 4. ProQuest 217302017. Archived from the original on January 16, 2018.
- Grandjeat, Yves-Charles (December 2006). "In Defense of a Transcultural Curriculum: A Post-Scriptum to the Canon Wars". Revue française d'études américaines. 110 (110). Éditions Belin: 23–41. doi:10.3917/rfea.110.0023. ISSN 0397-7870.
- Greer, Andrew Sean (June 6, 2006). "The NYTBR Best Book Votes: Why Andrew Sean Greer Chose The Amazing Adventures of Kavalier and Clay". bookcritics.org. New York: National Book Critics Circle. Archived from the original on September 18, 2020.
- Grossman, Lev (May 12, 2006). "Read It and Weep". Time. Archived from the original on April 26, 2014.
- Karr, Mary (June 3, 2006). "The NYTBR Best Book Votes: Why Mary Karr Chose Blood Meridian". bookcritics.org. New York: National Book Critics Circle. Archived from the original on September 22, 2020.
- Lydon, Christopher (May 22, 2006). "The Great American Novel". Open Source (Podcast). Boston: WBUR. Archived from the original on July 15, 2006.
- Mallon, Thomas (June 6, 2006). "The NYTBR Best Book Votes: Why Thomas Mallon Voted for Underworld". bookcritics.org. New York: National Book Critics Circle. Archived from the original on September 24, 2020.
- McCrum, Robert (October 8, 2006). "What's the best novel in the past 25 years?". The Observer. London: Guardian Media Group. Archived from the original on November 4, 2013.
- Miller, Laura (May 22, 2006). "Rank insubordination". Salon. Archived from the original on September 9, 2012.
- Moody, Rick (June 9, 2006). "The NYTBR Best Book Votes: Why Rick Moody Chose Grace Paley's The Collected Stories". bookcritics.org. New York: National Book Critics Circle. Archived from the original on September 19, 2020.
- Mount, Harry (May 13, 2006). "Anger as literary giants lose out to slavery novel". The Daily Telegraph. London. Archived from the original on July 7, 2016. (Subscription required.)
- NBCC (June 2, 2006). "The Rest of the Best". bookcritics.org. New York: National Book Critics Circle. Archived from the original on September 19, 2020.
- Nelson, Sara (April 17, 2006). "Run, Sammy, Run". Publishers Weekly. Vol. 253, no. 16. Archived from the original on April 7, 2022.
- Nugent, Benjamin (March 6, 2007). "Why Don't Republicans Write Fiction?". n+1. Archived from the original on June 8, 2020.
- O'Rourke, Meghan (May 21, 2006). "Debating the Best American Fiction". Slate.
- Robinson, Roxana (June 3, 2006). "The NYTBR Best Book Votes: Why Roxana Robinson Chose The Hours". bookcritics.org. New York: National Book Critics Circle. Archived from the original on September 22, 2020.
- Parker, Derek Royal, ed. (Fall 2011). "Contemporary American Fiction and the Confluence of Don DeLillo, Cormac McCarthy, Toni Morrison, Philip Roth, and John Updike: A Roundtable Discussion". Philip Roth Studies. 7 (2). West Lafayette, Indiana: Purdue University Press: 145–169. doi:10.1353/prs.2011.a469163. JSTOR 10.5703/philrothstud.7.2.145. S2CID 162001493.
- Roynon, Tessa (August 12, 2019). "In search of home: How Toni Morrison transformed American literature". ABC.net.au. Sydney: Australian Broadcasting Corporation. Archived from the original on January 29, 2022.
- Santin, Bryan M. (2021). "The Ascent of Toni Morrison in the Age of Conservative Pop Fiction, 1987–2000". Postwar American Fiction and the Rise of Modern Conservatism: A Literary History, 1945–2008. Cambridge University Press. pp. 199–239. doi:10.1017/9781108961974.006. ISBN 978-1-108-96197-4. S2CID 242866054.
- Scott, A. O. (May 21, 2006). "In Search of the Best". The New York Times Book Review. The New York Times Company. pp. 17–19. ProQuest 217292408. Archived from the original on November 1, 2021.
- Silliman, Ron (May 12, 2006). "Friday, May 12, 2006 – On Sunday, the New York Times Book Review [...]". Silliman's Blog. Archived from the original on October 29, 2006 – via Blogger.
- Simon, Emily T. (November 15, 2007). "Scholar looks at abiding interest in the 'Great American Novel'". The Harvard Gazette. Cambridge, Massachusetts: Harvard Public Affairs and Communications. Archived from the original on September 8, 2016.
- Sittenfeld, Curtis (June 9, 2006). "The NYTBR Best Book Votes: Why Curtis Sittenfeld Voted for White Noise". bookcritics.org. New York: National Book Critics Circle. Archived from the original on September 19, 2020.
- Straight, Susan (June 4, 2006). "All literature is local". Los Angeles Times. Archived from the original on May 12, 2021.
- Swain, Susan (May 19, 2006). BookExpo Interview. Washington, D.C.: C-SPAN.
- Tanenhaus, Sam, ed. (May 21, 2006a). "What Is the Best Work of American Fiction of the Last 25 Years?". The New York Times Book Review. The New York Times Company. p. 16. Archived from the original on August 25, 2011.
- Tanenhaus, Sam, ed. (May 21, 2006b). "The Judges". The New York Times Book Review. The New York Times Company. p. 16. Archived from the original on November 3, 2011.
- Thorn, Patti (June 17, 2006). "Awards feed Updike's ego, angst". Rocky Mountain News. Denver: E. W. Scripps Company. Gale A147159952.
- Travis, Molly Abel (Summer 2010). "Beyond Empathy: Narrative Distancing and Ethics in Toni Morrison's Beloved and J. M. Coetzee's Disgrace". Journal of Narrative Theory. 40 (2). Ypsilanti, Michigan: Eastern Michigan University: 231–250. doi:10.1353/jnt.2010.0007. JSTOR 41427229. S2CID 163128505.
