= In Sunlight and in Shadow =

2012 novel by Mark Helprin

- Hardcover edition
- Author: Mark Helprin
- Language: English
- Genre: Fiction novel
- Publisher: Houghton Mifflin Harcourt
- Publication date: October 2, 2012
- Publication place: United States
- Media type: Print; e-book; audiobook
- Pages: 720
- ISBN: 978-0-547-81923-5

In Sunlight and in Shadow is a novel by Mark Helprin published in 2012 by Houghton Mifflin Harcourt.

== Plot ==
It is set in New York City and often waxes lyrical about the city itself. It is the story of the love affair between Jewish business heir and former soldier, Harry Copeland, and Catherine Thomas Hale, also known by her stage name of Catherine Sedley, daughter of a wealthy, blue-blood New York family, from the time of their meeting on a Staten Island ferry.

== Similar works ==
Of all Helprin's works, this one is most similar to A Soldier of the Great War.
