= Memoir from Antproof Case =

1995 novel by Mark Helprin published through Harcourt

- Softcover edition
- Author: Mark Helprin
- Language: English
- Genre: Fiction novel
- Publisher: Harcourt Brace
- Publication date: April 1995
- Publication place: United States
- Media type: Print, e-book, audiobook
- Pages: 514 pp.
- ISBN: 978-0151000975
- Preceded by: A Soldier of the Great War (1991)
- Followed by: A City in Winter (1996)

Memoir from Antproof Case is a book by American writer Mark Helprin. The novel was initially published in April 1995.

== Plot ==
An elderly narrator who never reveals his real name writes a manuscript in the Brazilian jungles and hides it, page by page, in a termite-proof suitcase. The goal that he set for himself is truly ambitious: to tell his son about the things that led him to Brazil—after a childhood spent in New York City, and youth—in an elite Swiss clinic for the mentally ill, after studying at Harvard, after his service as a pilot during World War II, after decades of a successful career at a major Wall Street bank, after a number of impossible escapades, and a great love...

== Review ==
Never one to tell a lean story, Helprin indulges in dozens of riffs and digressions exploring the principles of physics, anatomy, education, morality, monetary theory, aeronautics, engineering and many other subjects. Some of these descriptions are little short of gorgeous; others are tedious. Similarly, Helprin's witty, ironic humor sometimes veers into farce (e.g., a banquet scene where bank officers are served steak and the narrator, in disgrace, must eat a turkey anus). To his credit, Helprin is endlessly inventive, and one expects his characters to behave as they do in fairy tales and fables, not in real life. Yet real life pulses so strongly in some scenes (especially the account of the events surrounding the death of the narrator's parents) that they could stand as set pieces, full and complete in their stark and immediate impact. For all of its excesses, there is enough magic in this story to keep readers actively engaged.

— Publishers Weekly
