= Fredericka =

Fredericka is a given name and may refer to:

- Fredericka Douglass Sprague Perry (1872-1943), American philanthropist and activist
- Fredericka Mandelbaum (1818–1894), New York entrepreneur and criminal fence operator
- Fredericka of Saxe-Gotha-Altenburg (1715-1775), German noblewoman and member of the House of Wettin
- Fredericka Elisabeth of Saxe-Eisenach (1669-1730), German noblewoman and member of the House of Wettin

== See also ==
- Frederica (disambiguation)
- Freddy and Fredericka, 2005 satiric novel by Mark Helprin
