= A City in Winter =

1996 novel by Mark Helprin

A City in Winter: The Queen's Tale
- Author: Mark Helprin
- Illustrator: Chris Van Allsburg
- Language: English
- Series: Swan Lake series
- Genre: Children's novel
- Publisher: Viking Juvenile
- Publication date: 1996
- Media type: Print (hardback & paperback)
- Pages: 144
- Preceded by: Memoir From Antproof Case

A City in Winter is a novel by American writer Mark Helprin, first published in 1996. Considered a children's novel, it is mixture of war novel and a satire of bureaucracy, telling the story of a 10-year-old queen's quest to regain her throne.

== Summary ==
All three books in this trilogy, Swan Lake, A City in Winter, and the final novel in the series, The Veil of Snows abound in winter season atmosphere and fairy tale magic. This imaginative novel continues the story of Swan Lake, in which an unnamed country girl hears from her beloved tutor the story of a prince and his beautiful lover Odette who are usurped from their kingdom by evil forces. By the book's end, the child has realized that she is the couple's daughter, and therefore, the rightful heir to the throne.

As A City in Winter begins, the youthful heir to the frosty kingdom is an adult, restored to the throne as queen. The story is told in flashback to her unborn child; she recalls her return to the city at age ten, and tells how the restoration came about. The events center on the period when the heroine slipped into the enormous city of the usurper, and took a job as a yam curler in the palace. The unnamed girl's foe, the usurper, is also never given a proper name: "His face was scarred and twisted, his towering form draped in black robes that flew in his wake like the wings of a crow that dies in midair and cartwheels to the ground. He wore a mask that made him look like death itself".

The girl finds in the capital city a million loyalists and former soldiers, all united by an oath of rebellion, waiting for a leader whose prophetic return will be heralded by a dimmed sun and a burning angel. In her quest to remove the usurper, the main character befriends a number of these outwardly obedient, inwardly rebellious people, including the baker-slave Notorincus and his slave-of-a-slave, Astrahn, a former general of the Damavand and renowned tactician, who brave terrifying odds with humor and selflessness to protect the protagonist, while unaware that she is their queen. For example, Notorincus reveals his cry of battle to be "I’ll never bake another waffle-torte for a single imperial soldier as long as I live!"

While the young girl does eventually regain the palace, her victory does not come without sacrifice. Near the novel's end, the child's tutor arrives in the city to aid her; knowing that the citizens will not accept her as queen without the prophetic appearance of a burning angel, the tutor douses himself with kerosene, lights a match, and as the people of the city watch, throws himself from an enormous tower to the city square below: "They say that as he fell, he flew, tumbling and wheeling in the air in slow motion, his arms outspread with all his strength, the fire trailing like the tail of a comet". It is not until this final act that the 10-year-old girl is able to open the doors of the palace to find the city bowing before her.

== Awards ==
A City in Winter won the World Fantasy Award for Best Novella in 1997.
