= Winter's Tale (novel) =

1983 fantasy novel by Mark Helprin

- The first edition cover
- Author: Mark Helprin
- Language: English
- Genre: Fantasy
- Published: 1983; Harcourt, Brace, Jovanovich (US); Weidenfeld & Nicolson (UK)
- Publication place: United States
- Media type: Print (hardback & paperback)
- Pages: 672 pp (hardback edition)
- ISBN: 0-297-78329-7 (hardback edition)
- OCLC: 11499502

Winter's Tale is a 1983 magic realism novel by Mark Helprin. It takes place in a mythic New York City, markedly different from reality, and in an industrial Edwardian era near the turn of the 20th century. Akiva Goldsman wrote a screenplay based on the novel and directed a feature film from the script, which was released in 2014.

== Plot ==
An immigrant couple who were denied admission at Ellis Island due to consumption are forced to return to the ship which had brought them. They break the display case containing a model of their ocean-going vessel and set their son Peter adrift in New York Harbor inside it. He is found in the reeds and adopted by the Baymen of the Bayonne Marsh, who send him off to Manhattan when he comes of age.

There he first becomes a mechanic and then is forced to become a burglar in a gang called the Short Tails. He soon makes a mortal enemy of their leader, Pearly Soames, and is constantly on the run from the gang. Early one winter morning, Peter is on the brink of being captured and killed by the gang when he is rescued by a mysterious white horse called Athansor, who becomes his guardian.

While attempting to rob a house, Peter meets and falls in love with Beverly Penn. The daughter of millionaire Isaac Penn, owner and publisher of the New York Sun, Beverly is eccentric, free-spirited, and enigmatic. This captivates Peter initially, but her deeper nature is revealed with her terminal consumption. Beverly never disappears from Peter's life, protecting him until the end. His love for the dying Beverly causes him to become obsessed with justice.

== Literary significance and reception ==
Winter's Tale was published in 1983. It was praised on the front cover of the New York Times Book Review (NYTBR) as "funny, thoughtful, passionate...large-souled."

People Magazine called it, "Entrancing, eccentric, hilarious, pierced by fantasy the way a storm is pierced by lightning." Joyce Carol Oates called it, "A dazzling modern fairy tale by a storyteller of seemingly effortless and artless grace." The reviewer for the New York Daily News said, "I have fallen in love with a book....The object of my affection is Mark Helprin's Winter's Tale....This sort of thing happens every now and then, usually about once a decade, and always, it seems, by surprise. The shock is all the greater when I find myself staying up, square-eyed from too much reading, until four in the morning, desperate to get to the end, at the same time hoping it never ends."

David Pringle, in the book Modern Fantasy: The 100 Best Novels, praised Winter's Tale as "a haunting piece of North American magic realism".

In May 2006, the New York Times Book Review published a list of American novels, compiled from the responses to "a short letter [from the review] to a couple of hundred prominent writers, critics, editors and other literary sages, asking them to identify 'the single best work of American fiction published in the last 25 years.'" Among the 22 books to have received multiple votes was Helprin's Winter's Tale.

== Film adaptation ==
The film adaptation was released on Valentine's Day, 2014, written and directed by Akiva Goldsman as his directorial debut. It starred Colin Farrell as Peter Lake, Russell Crowe as Pearly Soames, Jessica Brown Findlay as Beverly Penn, Jennifer Connelly as Virginia Gamely, and Will Smith as Lucifer though originally credited as "Judge". The cinematographer was Caleb Deschanel, and composer Hans Zimmer wrote the score.

Warner Bros. Pictures approved the picture in February 2011. The movie began filming in New York in October 2012 with a slight delay due to Hurricane Sandy. Shooting on the film ran through early 2013 and operated on a $60 million budget, down from the original $75 million budget. It is unknown when Helprin sold the movie rights.

Characters not appearing in the film include Jackson Mead, Virginia's son Martin, and both Vittorio and Hardesty Marratta.

== Representation in other media ==
The rock band The Waterboys published in 2004, in a reissue of their 1985 album This Is the Sea, a song called "Beverly Penn", directly inspired by the novel.
