= Freddy and Fredericka =

2005 novel by Mark Helprin

- Hardcover edition
- Author: Mark Helprin
- Language: English
- Genre: Fiction novel
- Publisher: Penguin Press
- Publication date: July 7, 2005
- Publication place: United Kingdom
- Media type: Print, e-book, audiobook
- Pages: 576 pp.
- ISBN: 978-1594200540

Freddy and Fredericka is a satiric novel by Mark Helprin. The book was initially published on July 7, 2005 by Penguin Press. In an interview, Helprin said that the idea for the story originated while he was in a restaurant in Portland, Oregon, while on book tour with his family to promote A Soldier of the Great War. The restaurant had a window through which patrons could see some people cooking and others washing dishes. One of Helprin's daughters asked if it was the Prince and Princess of Wales, who were in the news at the time, washing dishes.

== Plot ==
Freddy and Fredericka are a British royal couple similar to Prince Charles and Diana, Princess of Wales. The two are sent to America on a comic adventure to fulfill a quest to achieve Freddy's destiny.

== Critical reception ==
The novel was named by National Review to be one of the ten great conservative novels written by Americans since the 1950s.

The New Yorker said "at its best, the novel achieves genuine lightness," and The New York Times found it "great silly fun—a rowdy, rambunctious read that's part acid farce, part bittersweet fairy tale," but Allen Barra wrote in The Washington Post that it was "overwritten" and "never congeals as a fable, satire, farce or anything except a royal self-indulgence."
