= Great American Novel =

Canonical novel that is thought to embody the essence of America

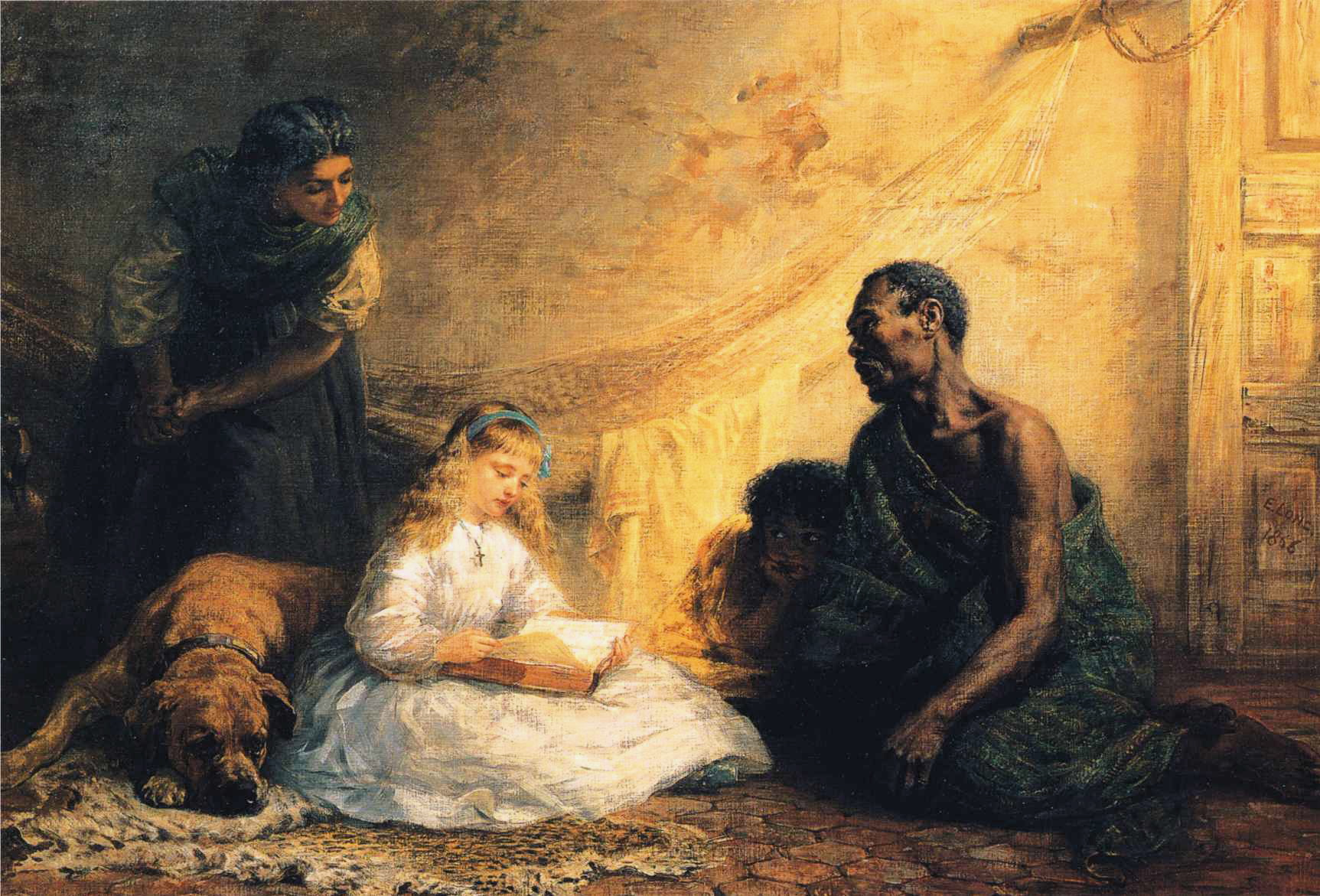
Uncle Tom's Cabin (1852) by Harriet Beecher Stowe is commonly cited as the Great American Novel—John William De Forest saw it as the closest possible novel.

The "Great American Novel" (sometimes abbreviated as GAN) is the term for a canonical novel that generally embodies and examines the essence and character of the United States. The term was coined by John William De Forest in an 1868 essay and later shortened to GAN. De Forest noted that the Great American Novel had most likely not been written yet.

Practically, the term refers to a small number of books that have historically been the nexus of discussion, including Moby-Dick (1851), Adventures of Huckleberry Finn (1884), The Great Gatsby (1925), and several others. Exactly what novel or novels warrant the title is without consensus and an assortment have been contended as the idea has evolved and continued into the modern age, with fluctuations in popular and critical regard. William Carlos Williams, Clyde Brion Davis and Philip Roth have all written novels about the Great American Novel—titled as such—with Roth's in the 1970s, a time of great interest in the concept.

Equivalents to and interpretations of the Great American Novel have arisen. Writers and academics have commented upon the term's pragmatics, the different types of novels befitting of title and the idea's relation to race and gender.

== History ==
=== Background and origin of the term ===
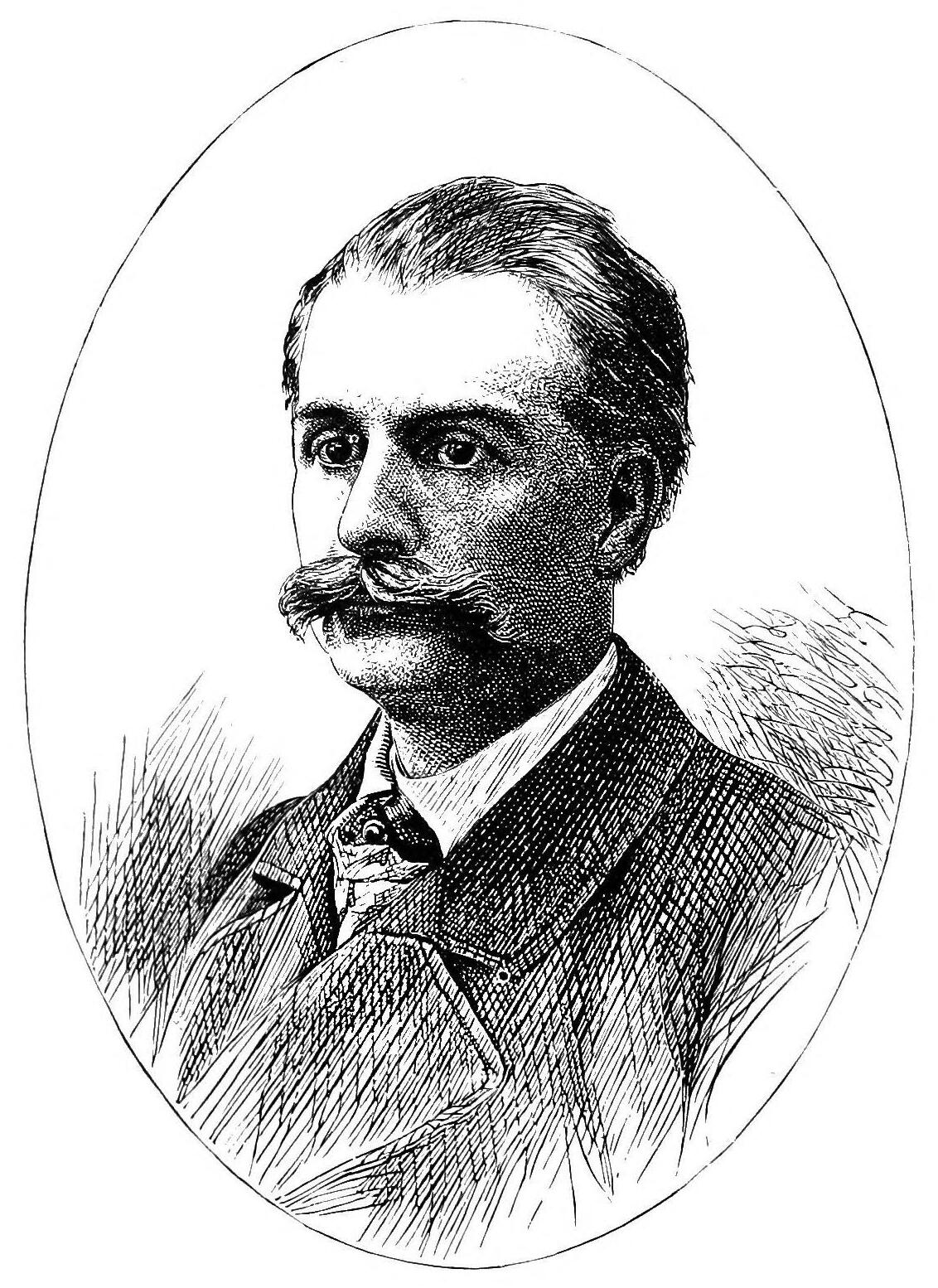
De Forest

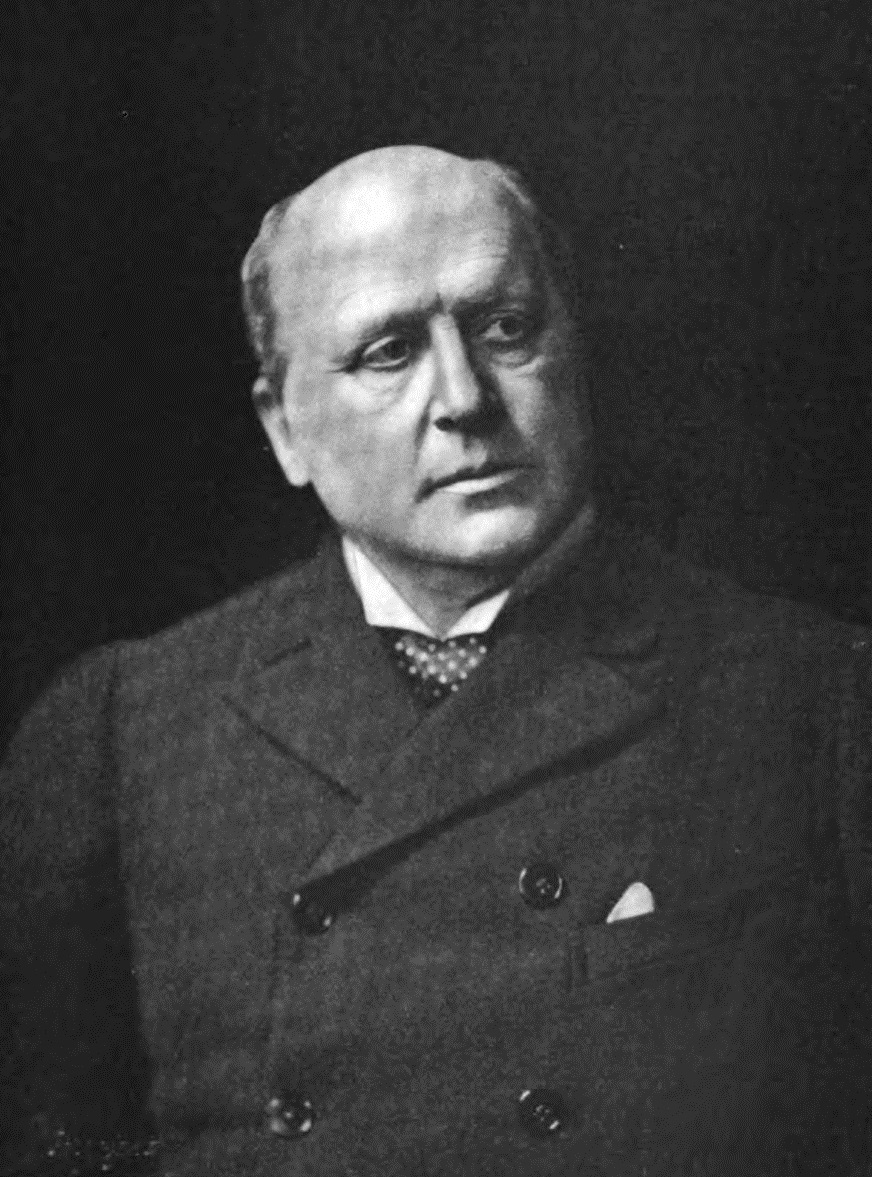
James

John William De Forest coined the term in 1868, and Henry James shortened it to GAN in 1880.

The development of American literature coincided with the nation's development, especially of its identity. Calls for an "autonomous national literature" first appeared during the American Revolution, and, by the mid-19th century, the possibility of American literature exceeding its European counterparts began to take shape, as did that of the Great American Novel, this time being the genesis of novels that would later be considered the Great American Novel.

The term "Great American Novel" originated in an 1868 essay by American Civil War novelist John William De Forest. De Forest saw it serving as a "tableau" of American society, and said that the novel would "paint the American soul" and capture "the ordinary emotions and manners of American existence". Similarly, Daniel Pierce Thompson said it had to be distinctly American. Although De Forest espoused praise and critique for contemporaneous novels, he ultimately concluded that the Great American Novel had yet to be written. The essay's publication coincided with the rising prestige of the novel. Previously, only five percent of American books were marked as novels, with most fictional works given the self-effacing title of a "tale". In 1880, writer Henry James simplified the term with the initialism "GAN".

=== Development ===
The term soon became popular, its ubiquity considered a cliché and disparaged by literary critics. Lawrence Buell stated that the concept was seen as a part of a larger national, cultural and political consolidation. According to JSTOR Daily's Grant Shreve, as the concept grew, concrete criteria for the Great American Novel developed:

- It must encompass the entire nation and not be too consumed with a particular region.
- It must be democratic in spirit and form.
- Its author must have been born in the United States or have adopted the country as his or her own.
- Its true cultural worth must not be recognized upon its publication.

Additionally, Shreve states, referencing Buell, that "several 'templates' or 'recipes' for the Great American Novel emerged. ... Recipe 1 is to write a novel that is 'subjected to a series of memorable rewritings.' ... Recipe 2 is what Buell calls 'the romance of the divide.' Novels of this kind ... imagine national (and geographic) rifts in the 'form of a family history and/or heterosexual love affair.' ... Recipe 3, a 'narrative centering on the lifeline of a socially paradigmatic figure ... whose odyssey tilts on the one side toward picaresque and on the other toward a saga of personal transformation, or failure of such.'"

From the turn of the century to the mid-twentieth century, the idea eluded serious academic consideration, being dismissed as a "naively amateurish age-of-realism pipe dream" not aligned with the culture of that time. Writers such as William Dean Howells and Mark Twain were equally blasé. Frank Norris too saw the concept as not befitting the time, stating that the fact of a great work being American should be incidental. Edith Wharton complained that the Great American Novel concept held a narrow view of the nation, simply being concerned with "Main Street". At this time, it also grew to become associated with masculine values.

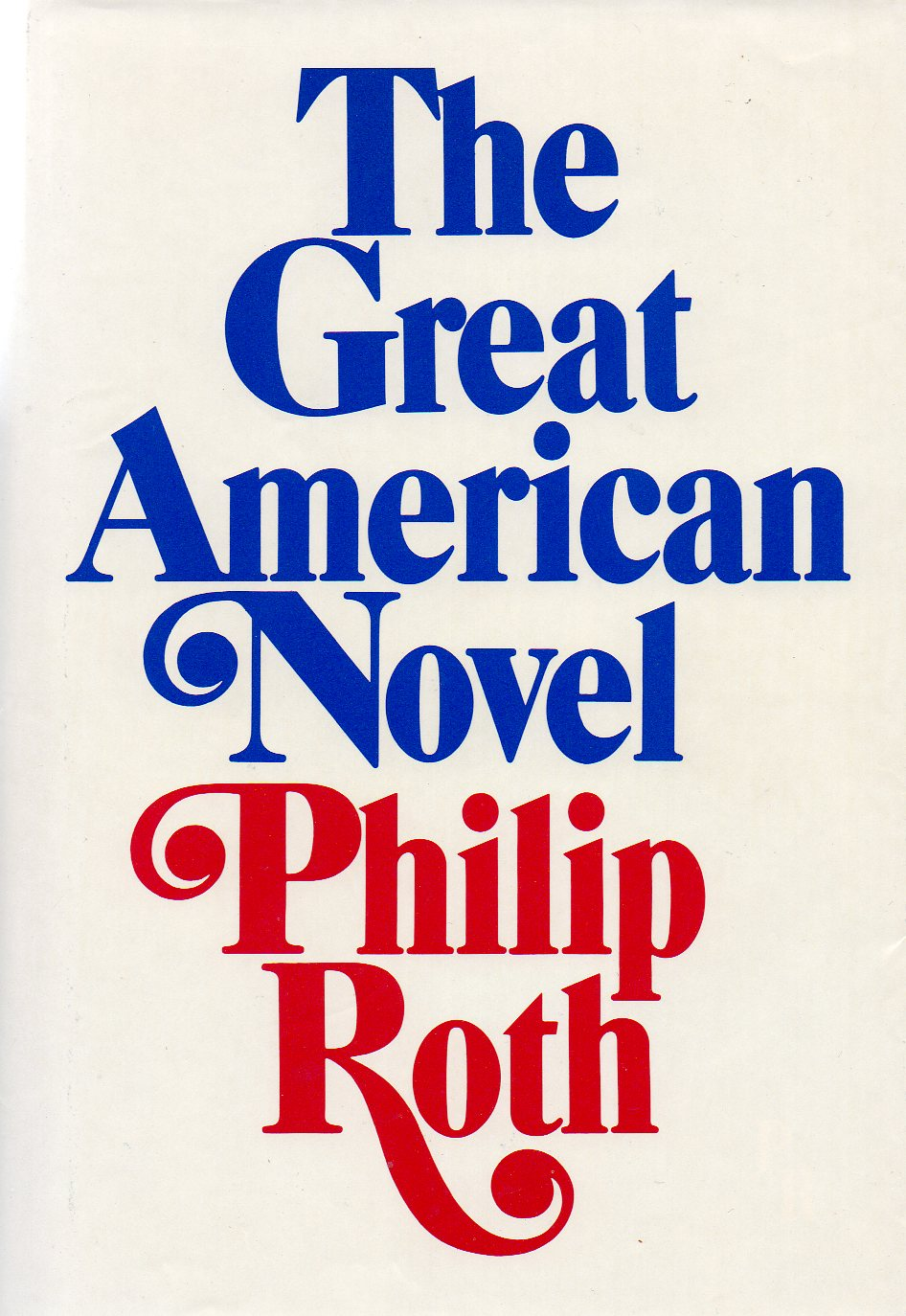
Philip Roth satirized the term with his 1973 novel The Great American Novel.

Despite this critical disregard, many writers, prepped with "templates" and "recipes" for the matter, sought to create the next Great American Novel. Upton Sinclair and Sinclair Lewis both sought to create the Great American Novel with The Jungle (1906) and Babbit (1924), respectively. William Carlos Williams and Clyde Brion Davis released satirical explorations both entitled The Great American Novel – Philip Roth would later release a novel of the same name. Bernard F. Jr. Rogers said that Kurt Vonnegut's "entire career might be characterised as an attempt to produce something like 'the GAN,' but of its own time". The 1970s saw a general resurgence of the concept, with The New York Times using the phrase the most in their history, a total of 71 times. (Note: This total excludes books with the phrase in their title.) The revival was perhaps the result of social change and related anxieties and the pursuit of a plateau between them.

In the 21st century, retaining its contention and derision, the concept has moved towards a more populist attitude, functioning as "catnip for a listicle-obsessed internet". (Note: According to Buell, the concept has always been "a more demotic than an academic enthusiasm".) Adam Kirsch noted that books such as Roth's American Pastoral (1997) indicate that writers are still interested in creating the Great American Novel. Commenting upon the Great American Novel's place in the 21st century, Stephens Shapiro said that "Maybe the GAN is a theme that rises in interest when the existing world system is amidst transformation, as America's greatness of all kinds swiftly fades away." When asked in a 2004 interview if the Great American Novel could be written, Norman Mailer—who had long been interested in the idea—said it could not, for the United States had become too developed of a nation. Tony Tulathimutte similarly dismissed it as "a comforting romantic myth, which wrongly assumes that commonality is more significant than individuality".

== Analysis ==
=== Racial and gender commentary ===
Multiple commentators have noted the concept's relation to racial and national identity, be it influence from by large-scale immigration, which brought forth authors closely aligned with the Great American Novel or novels detailing marginalized peoples, some furthermore trying to "bridge the racial divide". Commenting upon the idea's racial aspects and presence in popular consciousness, Hugh Kenner wrote in a 1953 issue of Perspective that:

The lad who was going to produce 'The Great American Novel' as soon as he had gotten his mind around his adolescent experience is part of the folklore of the 'twenties, and the prevalence of this myth documents the awareness of the young American of thirty years ago that the consciousness of his race remained uncreated.

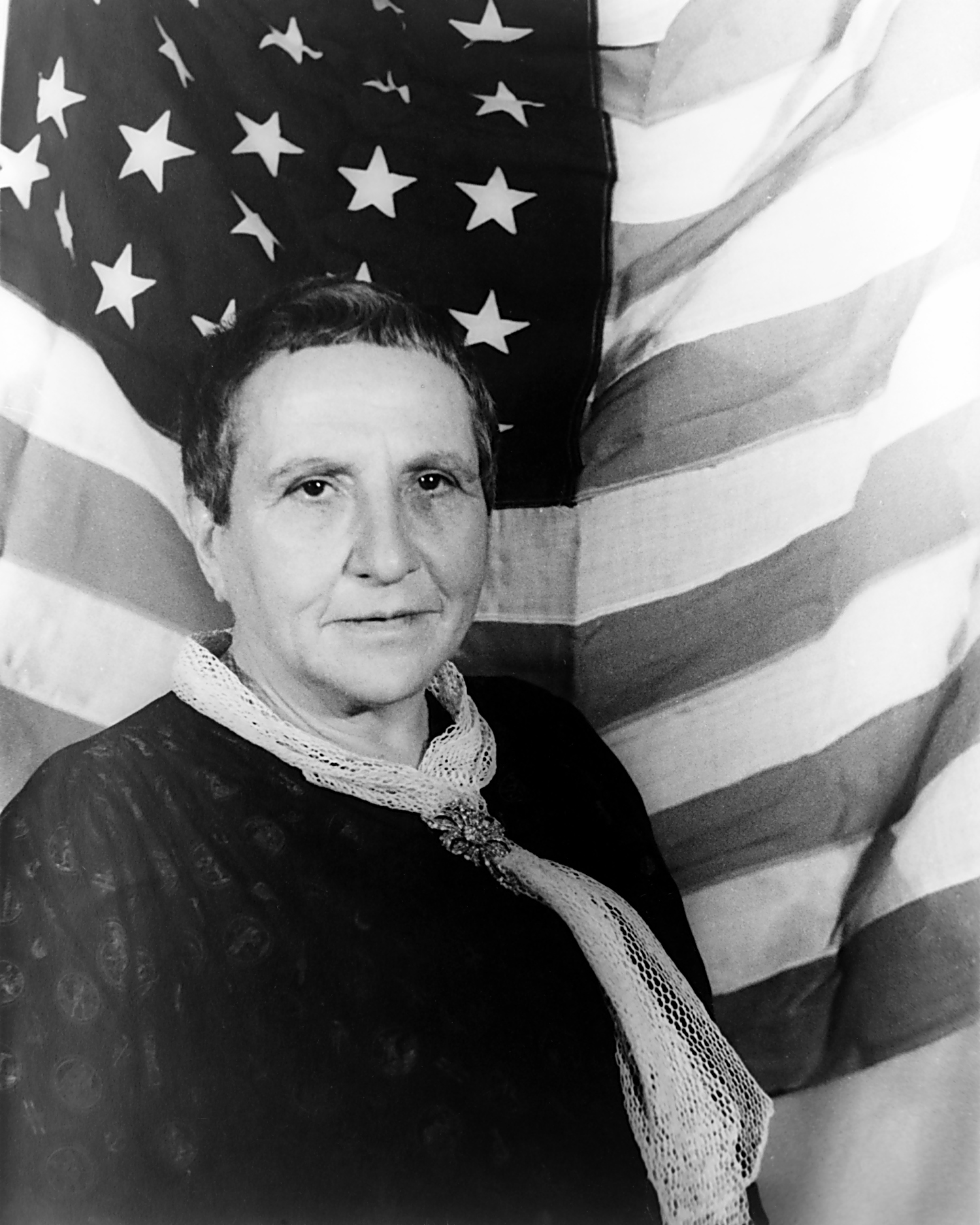
Stein

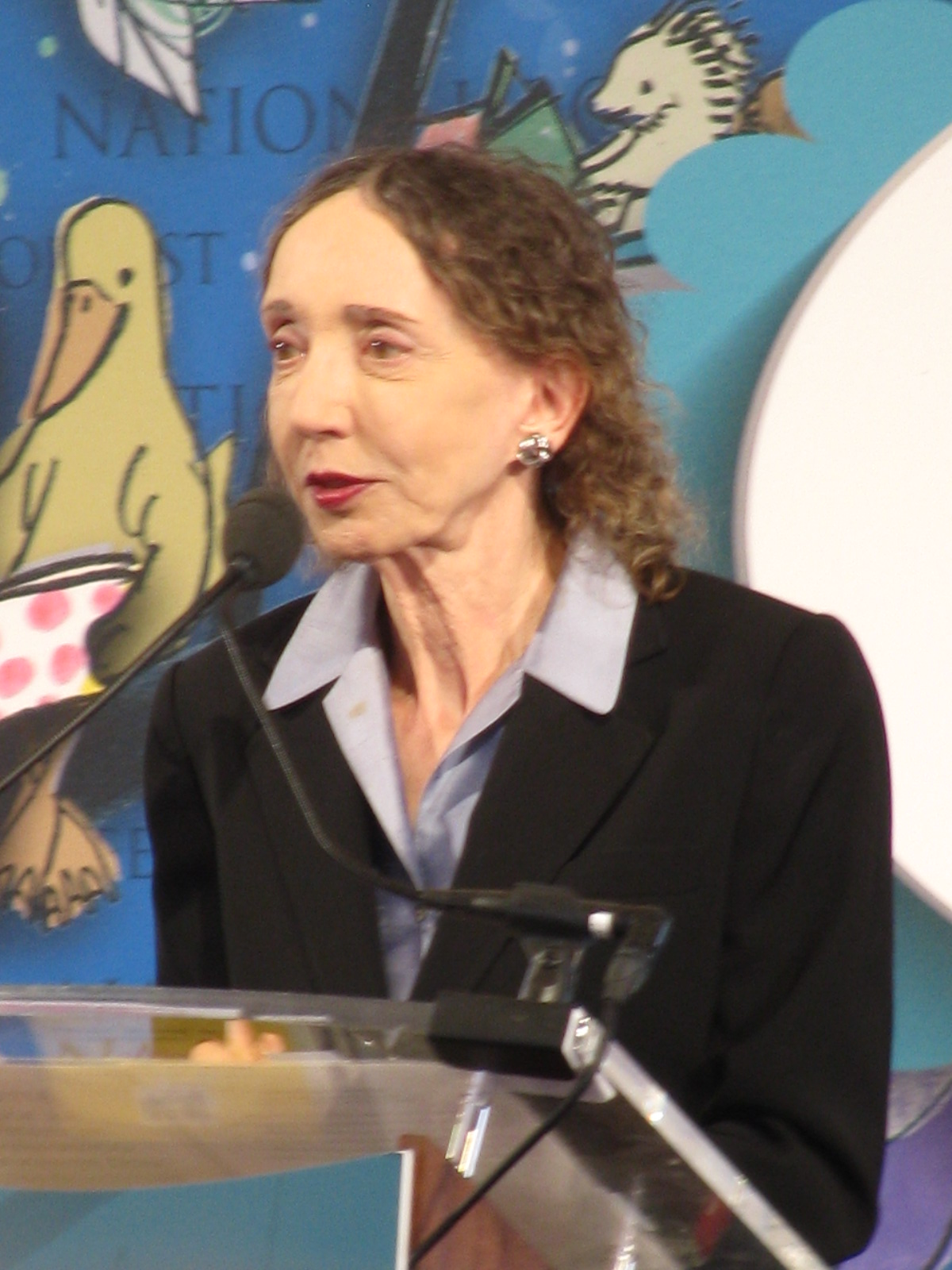
Oates

Gertrude Stein and Joyce Carol Oates are among women who have believed that the GAN was unattainable. Stein also thought her Jewish identity and homosexuality restricted her.

Perrin, Andrew Hoberek and Barbara Probst Solomon all noted that the '70s saw Jews pursue the GAN. Perrin said it was a boom decade for, what Hoberek called, the "Jewish GAN". Solomon was by 1972 sick of "nice Jewish sons who are writing the GAN". Aaron Latham, in a 1971 article, highlighted Roth and Mailer as Jews who wanted to the write the next GJN and GAN, respectively.

The Great American Novel's relation to masculinity was seen as a problem by female writers. Gertrude Stein once lamented that, as a lesbian Jewish woman, she would be unable to compose the Great American Novel. Joyce Carol Oates similarly felt that "a woman could write it, but then it wouldn't be the GAN". Viet Thanh Nguyen said that "[o]ne of the unspoken silences of the Great American Novel is the assumption that it can only be written by white men". Laura Miller wrote, in a Salon article, that "The presumption and the belligerence embodied in this ideal have put off many American women writers". She also noted that many characters in Great American Novel candidates are male: "the notion that a female figure might serve the same purpose undermines the very concept of the Great American Novel". Emily Temple of Literary Hub suggested that if the protagonist of Sylvia Plath's The Bell Jar (1963) were male it would likely be considered more seriously as a Great American Novel contender.

=== Interpretations ===
There are several different interpretations of what makes a Great American Novel. Some say that it depicts a diverse group facing issues representative of "epoch-defining public events or crises." John Scalzi felt that for a novel to be the Great American Novel it had to be ubiquitous and notable, and analyze the United States through a moral context. De Forest similarly saw the Great American Novel as having to capture the "essence" of America, its quality irrelevant. Norris considered the musings upon what made a novel "great" and/or "American" to showcase patriotic insecurity. Mohsin Hamid echoed the idea that the GAN is indicative of insecurity, connecting it to a "colonial legacy".

Commentators have said that the concept is exclusively American in nature. Journalist John Walsh offered a national equal in the form of Russian writer Leo Tolstoy's War and Peace (1869); Buell felt that Australia was the only country to replicate America's search. (Note: Shapiro speculated that this connection was because of their colonial past: "Perhaps nations founded on the genocide of indigenous people ... may strive to produce cultural works that can distract from the crimes of the past?") Scholes said that the Great American Novel has always been thought of adjacent to European literature. David Vann was of the belief that they had to be "anti-American". Rogers felt that it does not need to have American protagonists or be set in the United States and should not espouse patriotism or nationalism.

Buell identifies multiple types of Great American Novels. First is one who is subject to mysticism and stands the test of time. The second is "the romance of the divide", which imagines national rifts in the "form of a family history and/or heterosexual love affair"—race often plays a role. The third variety encapsulates the American Dream and sees its protagonist rise from obscurity. Fourthly, novels which are composed of a diverse cast of characters "imagined as social microcosms or vanguards" and who are placed with events and crises that serve to "constitute an image of 'democratic' promise or dysfunction". Buell also said speculative science fiction may be the basis for a possible fifth archetype.

Kasia Boddy wrote that, "[s]ince its initial formulation", the concept "has always been more about inspiration than achievement; the very fact that it has been attempted but remains 'unwritten' providing a spur to future engagement with both nation and national literature". Speculating on De Forest's intentions when devising the notion of the Great American Novel and commenting upon its development, Cheryl Strayed wrote that:

De Forest was arguing in hopes of not one Great American Novel, but rather the development of a literary canon that accurately portrayed our complex national character, has been lost on many, as generation after generation of critics have since engaged in discussions of who might have written the Great American Novel of any given age, and writers have aspired to be the one chosen — a competitive mode that is, I suppose, as American as it gets. It's also most likely the reason that the idea has persisted for so long. To think that one might be writing the Great American Novel, as opposed to laboring through a meandering 400-page manuscript...is awfully reassuring. I have a purpose! I am writing the Great American Novel!

Denoting an apocryphal state, film critic A. O. Scott compared the GAN to the Yeti, the Loch Ness monster and the Sasquatch.

== Notable candidates ==
Table containing possible Great American Novels
| Year | Cover or title page | Novel | Portrait | Author | Commentary | Ref. |
|---|---|---|---|---|---|---|
| 1826 | | The Last of the Mohicans | A drawn portrait of James Fenimore Cooper, based on a photograph | James Fenimore Cooper | Although John William De Forest critiqued Cooper's writing as boring, many consider The Last of the Mohicans to be the first GAN. It was influential in defining American literature and addresses themes which are common in later American works, including rugged individualism and freedom. | |
| 1850 | | The Scarlet Letter | A black-and-white photograph of Nathaniel Hawthorne, bearing a mustache and medium-length hair | Nathaniel Hawthorne | Although John William De Forest thought The Scarlet Letter unworthy of the label of GAN, it is now widely included on most lists. Lawrence Buell recognized it as a "reluctant master text"—his first GAN script. | |
| 1851 | | Moby-Dick | A photograph of Herman Melville seated at a chair, arms crossed and sporting combed-back hair and a blocky beard | Herman Melville | According to Hester Blum of Penn State University, "What makes Moby-Dick the Greatest American Novel, in other words, is that Melville can invoke the preposterous image of a sobbing, heart-stricken moose and we think, yes, I have come to know exactly what that sounds like, and I know what world of meaning is contained within that terrific sound". | |
| 1852 | | Uncle Tom's Cabin | A photograph of a seated Harriet Beecher Stowe, wearing a dress and a shawl | Harriet Beecher Stowe | Lawrence Buell claimed it to be the first novel to receive the acclaim of the GAN and that it was widely accepted that it was 'nearest approach to the desired phenomenon'. John William De Forest noted it as the only possible contender and as "a picture of American life". | |
| 1868 | | Little Women | A hazy photograph of Louisa May Alcott, with dark hair wearing a dress | Louisa May Alcott | According to Marlowe Daly-Galeano, what makes Little Women "such an amazing novel [and possible contender for the GAN] is that it gives women's voices and women's stories the prime position in a way that...[was] very new and fresh to readers in the...late 1860s," and suggests that the "strongest mark of Little Women's influence" lies in subsequent stories told about "circles of women" and "cool girl protagonists" which all seem to have a "direct link" to Little Women. Gregory Eiselein remarks that several aspects of Little Women (its inclusion of colloquialisms and grammatical errors in its dialogue, the familiarity of the March girls' struggles, etc.) make it "one of the founding documents of American literary realism." | |
| 1884 | | Adventures of Huckleberry Finn | A hazy photograph of Mark Twain, with white hair and mustache in a light-colored suit | Mark Twain | The Adventures of Huckleberry Finn was one of the first American novels to utilize a regional vernacular. In 1935, Ernest Hemingway stated that "All modern American literature comes from one book by Mark Twain called 'Huckleberry Finn'." William van O'Connor wrote, in a 1955 issue of College English, that "we are informed, from a variety of critical positions, that [it] is the truly American novel". | |
| 1895 | | The Red Badge of Courage | A photograph Stephen Crane in a suit, with parted hair and a mustache | Stephen Crane | Crane was among the earliest generation of American novelists to be influenced by John William De Forest and consciously strove to produce a "National Novel". Critic Robert Barr had named him the "most likely to produce the great American novel" only two years before Crane died suddenly at the age of 28. According to Yale professor of literature Jay Martin, Crane's war novel The Red Badge of Courage, set during the Civil War, "marks the culmination of the Great American Novel". | |
| 1925 | | The Great Gatsby | A photograph of F. Scott Fitzgerald with a slight smile and parted, slicked-back hair | F. Scott Fitzgerald | Emory Elliott wrote, in 1991, that it is "still frequently nominated as the GAN". Kirsch, in 2013, said it to be "one of the first titles to come to mind whenever the Great American Novel is mentioned". Deirdre Donahue of USA Today and Fitzgerald scholar James L. W. West III felt that its "embodiment of the American spirit", relevance and prose were the reasons as to why it's the GAN. | |
| 1925 | | Gentlemen Prefer Blondes | A photograph of Anita Loos, wearing a fur-lined dress and a large dress hat | Anita Loos | Edith Wharton and Frank Crowninshield proclaimed the novel to be the GAN. | |
| 1926 | | The Sun Also Rises | | Ernest Hemingway | Malcolm Cowley and Philip Young established the modern reputation of the novel, as one of the most important books in American canon, and the definitive portrait of the "Lost Generation". | |
| 1936 | | Absalom, Absalom! | A photograph of William Faulkner in a suit and with a mustached, reclined against a brick wall | William Faulkner | Absalom, Absalom! has been said to represent Lawrence Buell's "romance of the divide". | |
| 1936 | | Gone with the Wind | | Margaret Mitchell | Described by Lawrence Buell as another "romance of the divide". | |
| 1939 | | The Grapes of Wrath | A photo of John Steinbeck. His hair is slicked-back and closely shaved on the sides. He has a mustache and facial hair on his chin. | John Steinbeck | Jay Parini identified it as "a great American novel" due to its focus on United States during a crisis and the eclectic depiction of American life. Richard Rodriguez, similarly, felt that it was "the great American novel that everyone keeps waiting for" because of how it showed "the losers in America". Bill Kauffman declared it a possible candidate for the GAN alongside Moby Dick, Ole Rølvaag’s Giants in the Earth, and Frank Norris’s The Octopus. | |
| 1951 | | The Catcher in the Rye | A photograph of J.D. Salinger, wearing a suit and sporting dark, combed hair | J. D. Salinger | The Catcher in the Rye is an example of a writer setting out to write the GAN and receiving such praise. | |
| 1952 | | Invisible Man | Ralph Ellison is pictured sitting in a chair before a bookcase. He is wearing a suit and has a mustache and receding hair-line. | Ralph Ellison | Joseph Fruscione said that Invisible Man was the GAN because it can be "many things to many readers". | |
| 1953 | | The Adventures of Augie March | A photograph of Saul Bellow with an open book before a bookcase. He is wearing a suit and has somewhat curly hair. | Saul Bellow | Martin Amis thought that The Adventures of Augie March was the GAN because of its "fantastic inclusiveness, its pluralism, its qualmless promiscuity". | |
| 1955 | | Lolita | A photograph of Vladimir Nabokov. Wearing a collared shirt, Nabokov is pictured in his later years, with aging skin and white hair. | Vladimir Nabokov | Mary Elizabeth Williams called Lolita the GAN because of its prose and says "'Lolita' forever remains a thing of timeless beauty." | |
| 1960 | | To Kill a Mockingbird | A photograph of Harper Lee in an outdoor setting. She has short hair and appears to be examining something in the sand and grass. | Harper Lee | John Scalzi calls it a GAN in that it is a notable and ubiquitous work that also deals with morality and the American experience. Oprah Winfrey described it as "our national novel." | |
| 1973 | The silhouette of a row of buildings is situated at the bottom of this bright orange cover. "Gravity's Rainbow, Thomas Pynchon" is printed in bold text in the center. | Gravity's Rainbow | | Thomas Pynchon | Pynchon's postmodern novel of World War II is commonly cited as "the most important American novel" of the post-war era. It has been said to conform to Buell's fourth type of GAN. | |
| 1985 | | Blood Meridian | A title page reading "Blood Meridian or The Evening Redness in the West" with the author's name, "Cormac McCarthy", positioned below the title. | Cormac McCarthy | David Vann felt that Blood Meridian was a GAN because it explored the United States’ genocide of Native American people. William Dalrymple states "this book [is] the Great American Novel. It's a beautifully written, dark, bleak western—but unlike any western I'd ever known." | |
| 1987 | | Beloved | Toni Morrison is pictured in a turtle-neck. She is sporting an afro. | Toni Morrison | The novel is noted for its depiction of the psychological effects of slavery and racism. When Beloved topped a poll seeking "the best work of American fiction" published from 1980 to 2005, A. O. Scott remarked that "Any other outcome would have been startling, since Morrison's novel has inserted itself into the American canon more completely than any of its potential rivals." Beloved has been noted to align with Buell's third type of GAN. | |
| 1991 | | American Psycho | Bret Easton Ellis is pictured standing on front of a stone wall and greenery. He is wearing a blazer over a blue collared shirt and has a lanyard on his neck. | Bret Easton Ellis | Julia Keller saw the novel's inclusion of "brand names and sex and social anxiety" as part of the reason why it is the GAN. | |
| 1996 | | Infinite Jest | David Foster Wallace is pictured with shoulder-length hair and a short beard. Wearing frameless glasses, he is speaking at a microphone and is wearing a black denim jacket over a t-shirt. | David Foster Wallace | Lawrence Buell noted that "For an appreciable number of turn-of-the-twenty-first-century readers...Infinite Jest [is] the GAN of our days". | |
| 1997 | | Underworld | An elderly and spectacled Don DeLillo is pictured reading from paper at a microphone. He is wearing a sweater over a collared shirt. | Don DeLillo | According to Robert McCrum, it developed a reputation as the GAN almost immediately after its publication. | |

== See also ==
- Encyclopedic novel
- Literary fiction
- Postmodern literature

== Notes and references ==
=== Works cited ===
- Buell, Lawrence (2014). The Dream of the Great American Novel. The Belknap Press of Harvard University Press. ISBN 9780674051157. OCLC 871257583.
- Martin, Jay (1967). Harvests of Change: American Literature, 1865-1914. Prentice-Hall. ASIN B0000CNMVK.
- Weisenburger, Steven C. (2006). A Gravity's Rainbow Companion: Sources and Contexts for Pynchon's Novel. University of Georgia. ISBN 9780820328119.
