= A Soldier of the Great War =

1991 novel by Mark Helprin

- Paperback edition
- Author: Mark Helprin
- Language: English
- Genre: War novel
- Publisher: Harcourt
- Publication date: May 1991
- Publication place: United States
- Media type: Print (hardback & paperback)
- Pages: 804 pp
- ISBN: 978-0151836000
- OCLC: 22308235
- Dewey Decimal: 813/.54 20
- LC Class: PS3558.E4775 S65 1990

A Soldier of the Great War is a novel by American writer Mark Helprin. It tells the story of an Italian World War I veteran, and his numerous experiences during "The Great War". It was published in May 1991 by Harcourt.

== Overview ==
The book focuses on an aged World War I veteran who recounts his life and adventures while traveling with a young man he meets after the two of them are thrown off a bus, the former leaving after the latter is refused entry, as the older man marches toward a visit with his granddaughter, neither knowing the outcome of their journey.

As a young man, Alessandro Giuliani foresees Italy's entry into the Great War and joins the navy rather than waiting to be drafted into the more dangerous infantry. This reasoned and logical course of action has no place in a world gone mad, and Alessandro's life, loves, friendships and fortunes all take bizarre and often tragic turns. Still, Alessandro is able to find beauty not so much because he is a professor of aesthetics (though he is) but because he is profoundly spiritual. As he nears the end of his life story, Alessandro tells his young companion, "And yet if you asked me what [the truth] was, I can't tell you. I can tell you only that it overwhelmed me, that all the hard and wonderful things of the world are nothing more than a frame for a spirit, like fire and light, that is the endless roiling of love and grace. I can tell you only that beauty cannot be expressed or explained in a theory or an idea, that it moves by its own law, that it is God's way of comforting His broken children."

== Literary significance and reception ==
The book spent eight weeks on Publishers Weekly bestseller list. Thomas Keneally, writing for the New York Times, praised Helprin as a "brilliant iconoclast", and the novel a "mischievous, idiosyncratic and powerful book." Reviewer Eugene Larson wrote, "Helprin’s works are life-affirming, humanistic tales of heroic adventures." Publishers Weekly wrote, "Energetic prose, poetic images of great intensity and an antic imagination combine in this gripping moral fable narrated by a septuagenarian irrevocably altered by WW I."

Bruce Bawer in The New Criterion included the novel in a group of works that "soar above the shallow level at which most American literary fiction operates nowadays."
