= List of neighborhoods in Newark, New Jersey =

Populated places in Essex County, New Jersey, US

The following is a list of neighborhoods in Newark, New Jersey, United States within its five political wards. each with distinct neighborhoods.

== North Ward ==
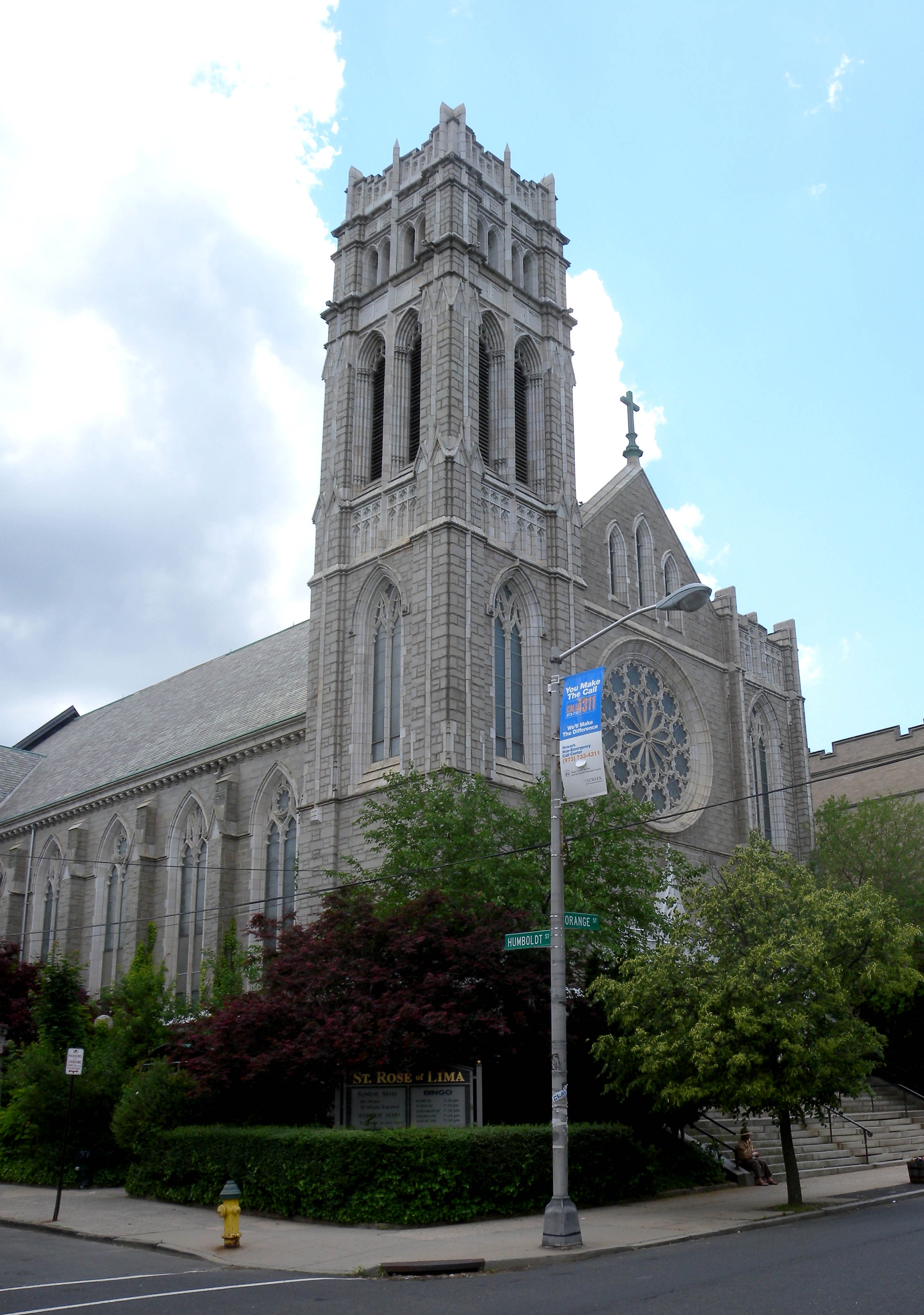
St. Rose of Lima Church in Roseville

- Broadway
- Forest Hill
- Mount Pleasant
- Roseville
- Seventh Avenue
- Woodside

== South Ward ==
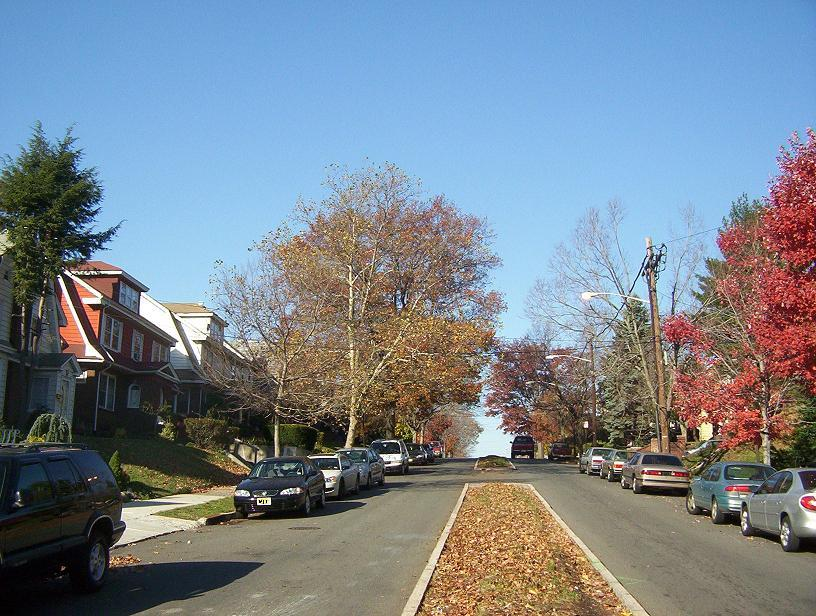
A residential street in Weequahic

- Clinton Hill
- Dayton
- Port Newark
- South Broad Valley
- Weequahic

== Central Ward ==
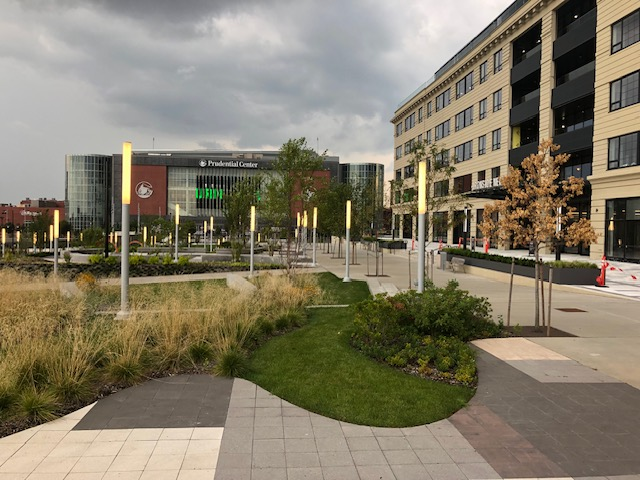
Mulberry Commons and Prudential Center, Downtown Newark

- The Coast/Lincoln Park
- Downtown Newark
- Government Center
- Springfield/Belmont
- University Heights
- Teachers Village
- Essex County Government Complex
- James Street Commons Historic District
- Four Corners

== East Ward ==
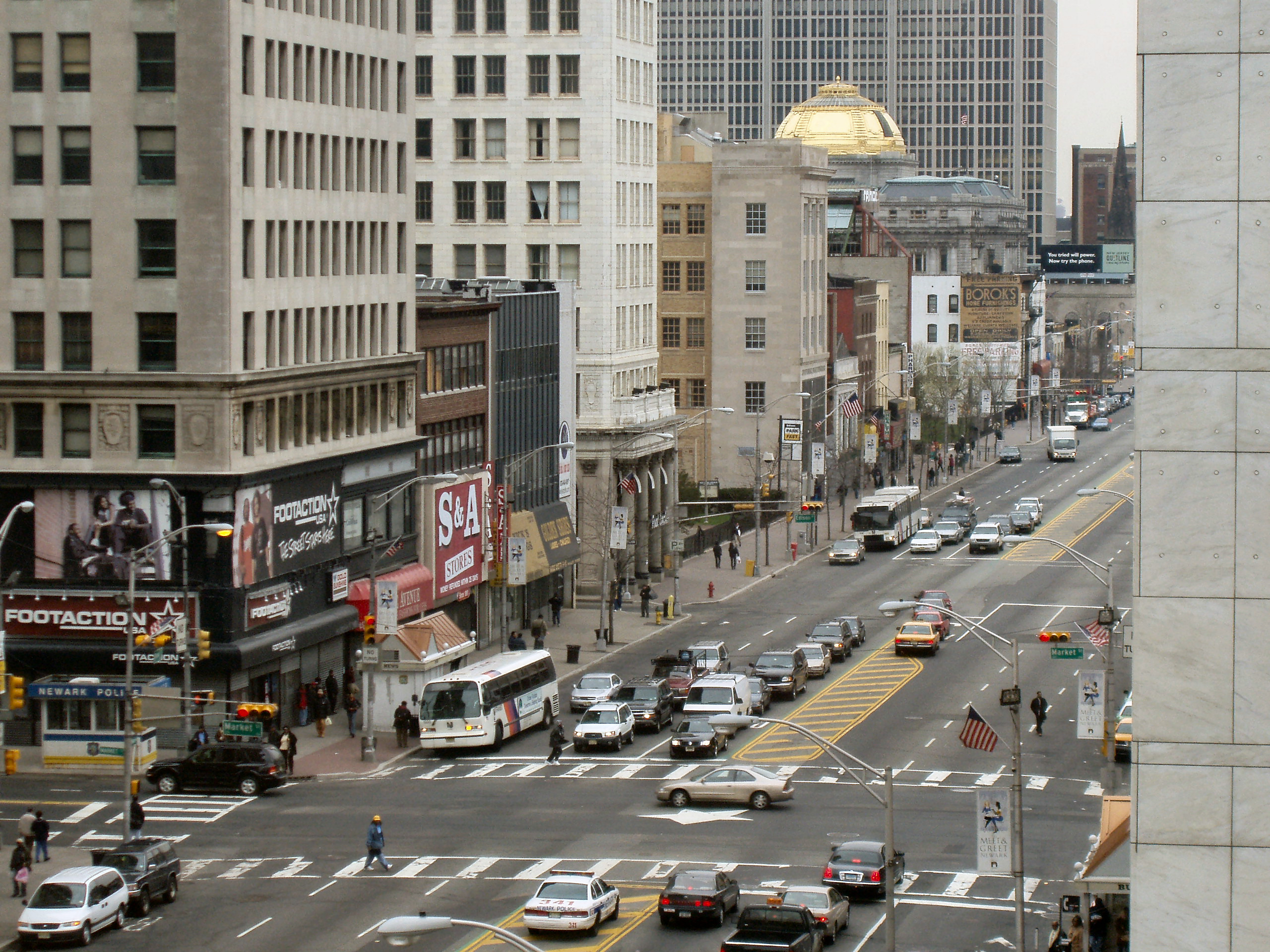
Four Corners

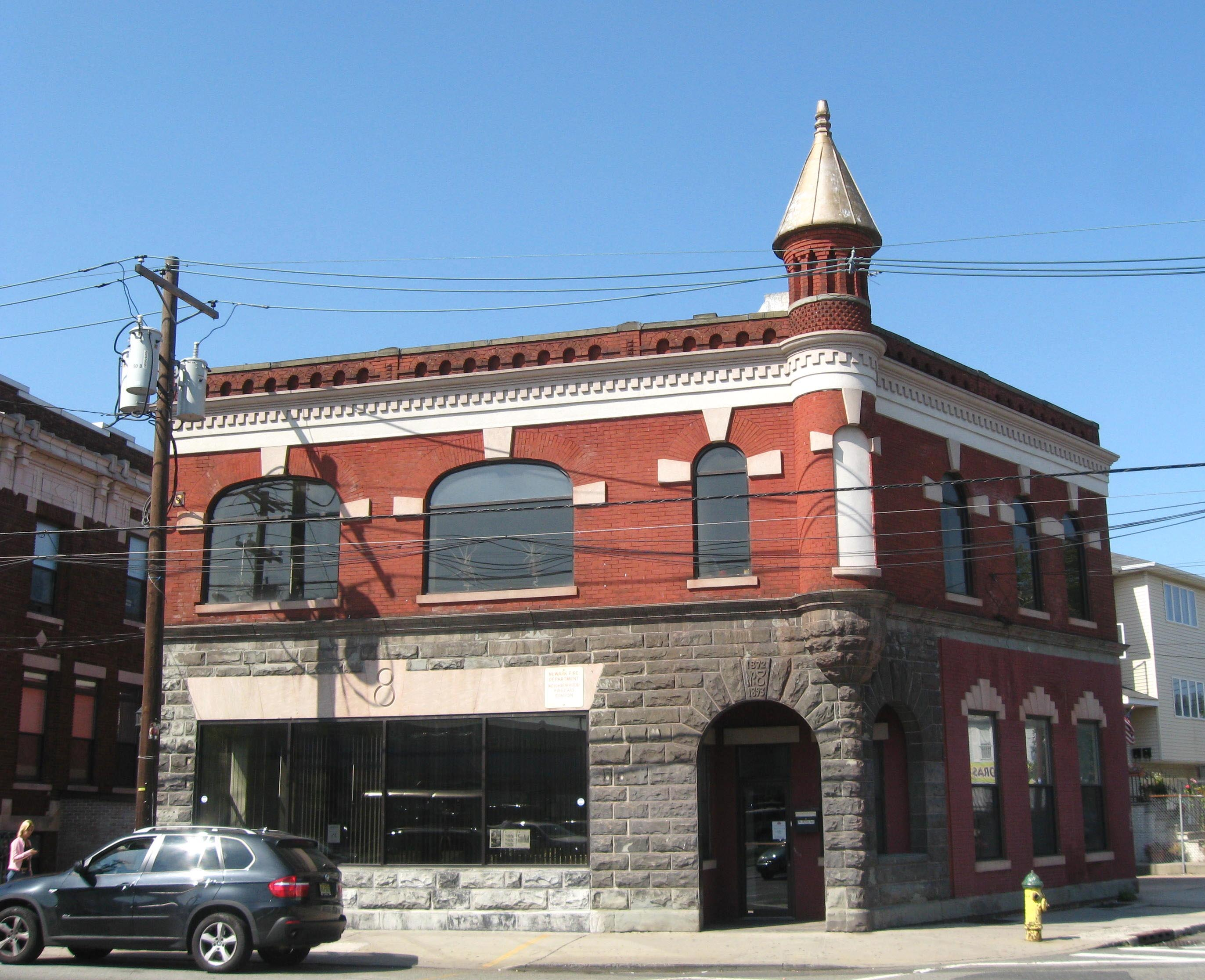
Former Engine 8 quarters of the NFD, located in the Ironbound

- Four Corners
- Five Corners
- Gateway Center
- The Ironbound

== West Ward ==
- Fairmount
- Ivy Hill
- Vailsburg
- West Side
