= Newark Fire Division =

Emergency services in New Jersey, United States

Coordinates: 40.73355°N 74.19439°W

Operational area
- Country: United States
- State: New Jersey
- City: Newark

Agency overview
- Annual budget: $65,840,150 (2013)
- Staffing: Career
- Fire chief: Del Ortiz
- EMS level: Basic Life Support (BLS)
- Motto: "Public Safety First"

Facilities and equipment
- Divisions: 1 Division
- Battalions: 6 Battalions (Four Fire Suppression Battalions, One Safety Battalion and One Special Operations Battalion)
- Stations: 16 Firehouses
- Engines: 16 Engine Companies
- Trucks: 8 Truck Companies
- Platforms: 1 Platform Truck
- Rescues: 1 Heavy Rescue Company
- Tenders: 1 Water Tender Truck
- HAZMAT: 3 Hazardous Materials Units
- USAR: 2 Urban Search And Rescue Units
- Wildland: 1 Wildland Unit
- Fireboats: 2 Fireboats
- Rescue boats: 2 Rescue Boats
- Light and air: 1 Light And Air Unit

Website
- Official website

The Newark Fire Division provides Fire Protection Services, Hazardous Materials Mitigation Services, Emergency Medical Response Services and Specialized Rescue Services in the city of Newark, New Jersey. In all the division is responsible for protecting 26.107 sq mi (67.617 km). Originally separate departments, the Police, Fire, Office of Emergency Management and Homeland Security were consolidated into a Department of Public Safety under Mayor Ras J. Baraka. The Division is part of the Metro Urban Search And Rescue (USAR) Strike Team which is composed of nine north Jersey fire departments working together to address major emergency and rescue situations.

== Organization ==
The Newark Fire Division is the second largest municipal fire department in the state of New Jersey. The division comprises Six Battalions, three division offices, and nine special operations units. The division offices are the Administration Office, Special Operations Facility, and Special Services Division. The Special Operations Units are the Hazardous Materials Response, De-Contamination Unit, Mobile Lab Unit, Medical Ambulance Bus, Urban Search and Rescue, High Angle Rope Rescue and Confined Space Rescue, Marine Division, Arson Squad, and Fire Preventions Bureau.

== Operations ==
The Newark Fire Division is the second largest fire department in the state of New Jersey, and protects NJ's largest city with a population of 311,549 as of 2020, and a land area of 26.107 square miles. As a part of the Firefighting Division, the Newark Fire Department currently operates 16 Engine Companies, 8 Ladder Companies, and 1 Rescue Company operating out of 16 firehouses, located throughout the city. These Companies are organized into 4 firefighting Battalions (Battalions 1,3,4, and 5), which are commanded by one Battalion Chief each shift. The Specialized Units are under the Command of the Special Operations Battalion Chief (Battalion 6). The Safety Battalion Chief (Battalion 2) provides Safety Services at major Incidents. There is a Deputy Chief, also known as a Tour Commander, who commands all of the Battalion Chiefs each shift.

The division is part of the Metro Urban Search And Rescue (USAR) Strike Team, which consists of nine northern New Jersey fire departments and other emergency services divisions working to address major emergency rescue situations.

== Stations and apparatus ==
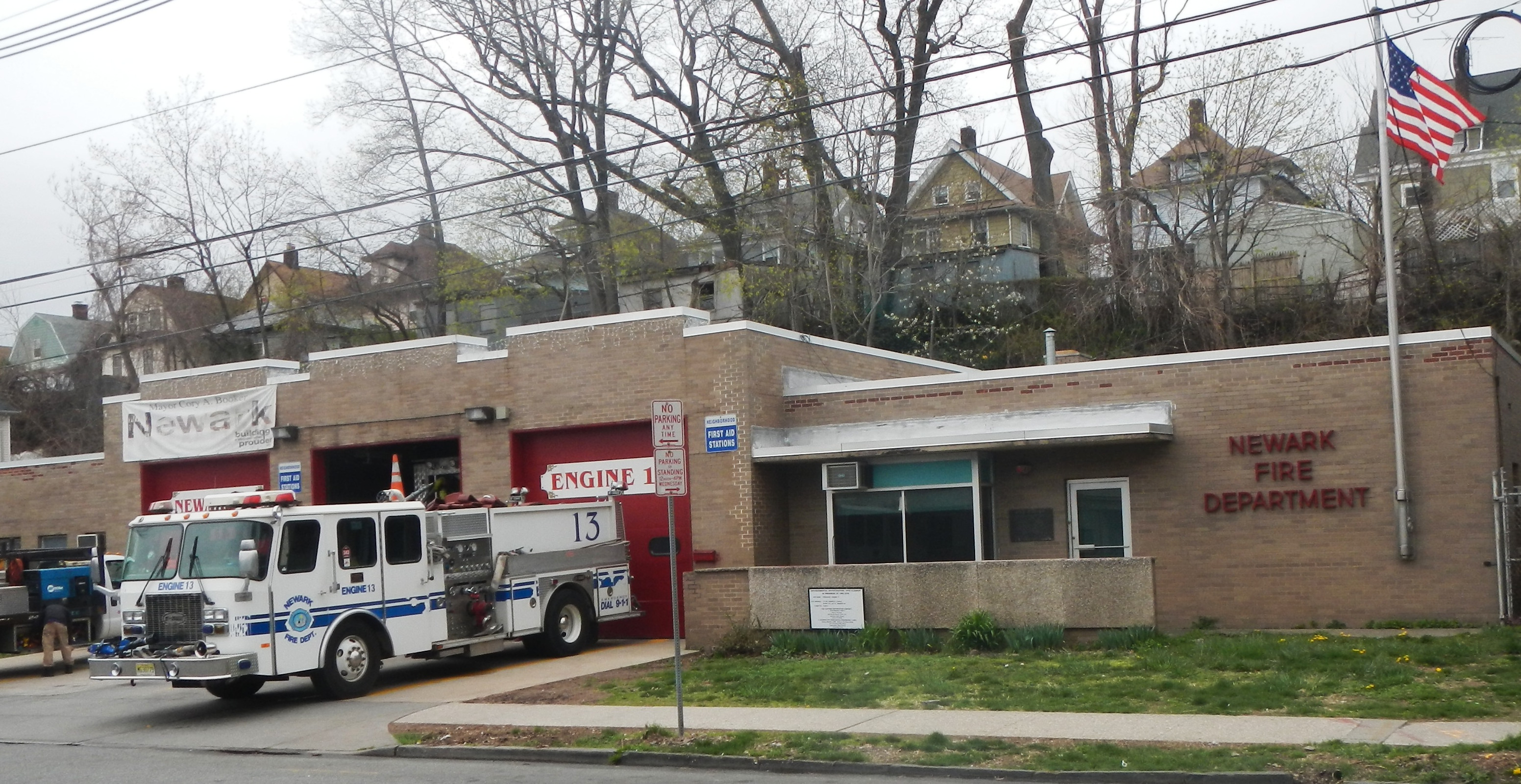
The quarters of Engine 13 & Ladder 6 on Mt. Prospect Ave.

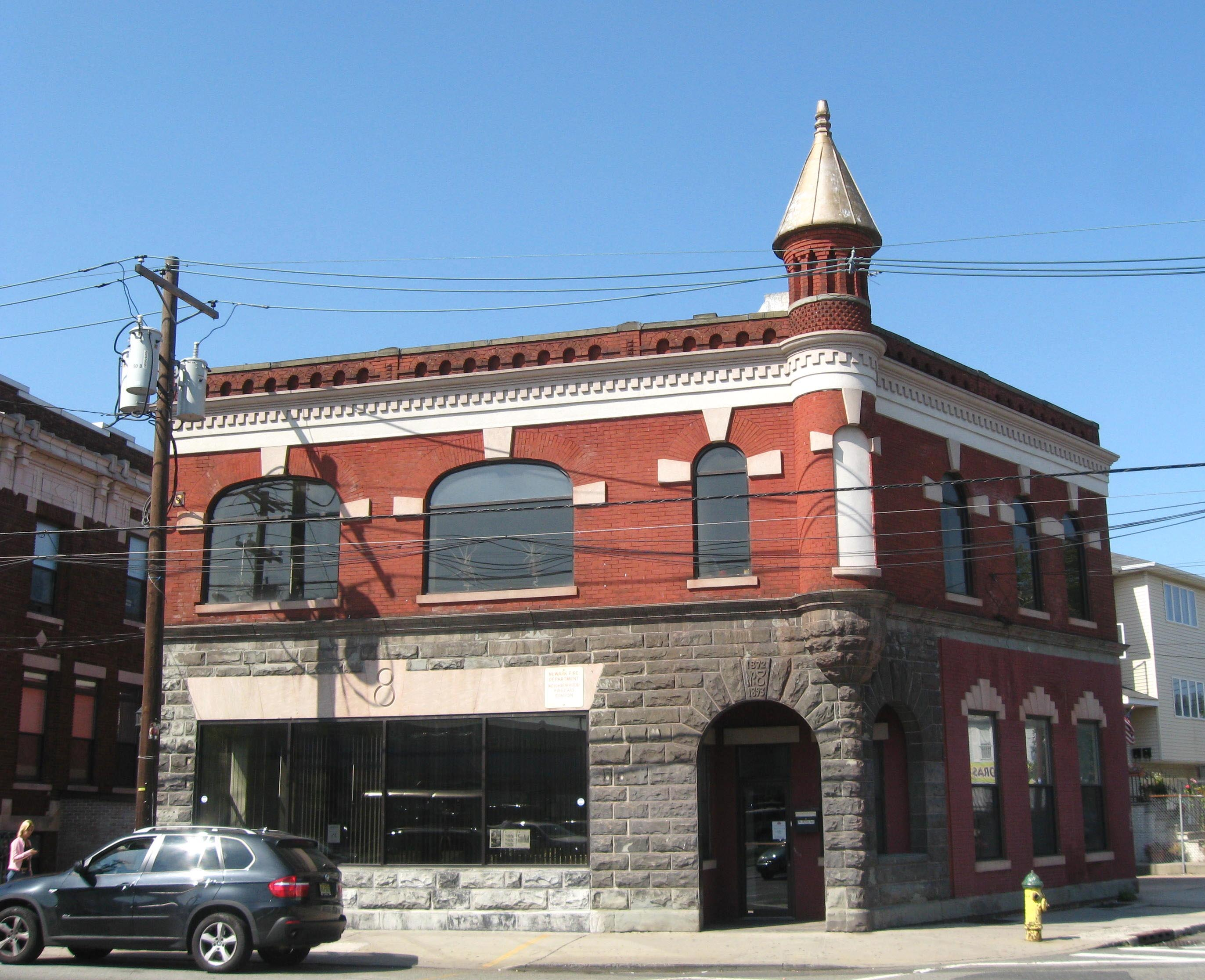
The former quarters of Engine 8 on Ferry St.

Below is a list of all fire companies and firehouses in the city of Newark. All Special Operations, Haz-Mat, support, spare and reserve apparatus, are all housed at 191 Orange St. unless otherwise noted below.

| Engine Company | Ladder Company | Special Unit | Deputy Chief or Battalion Chief Unit | Battalion | Address | Neighborhood |
|---|---|---|---|---|---|---|
| Engine 5 | | | | 5 | 65 Congress St. | North Ironbound |
| Engine 6 | | | Deputy Chief 1 (Tour Commander) | 1 | 344 Springfield Ave. | Springfield/Belmont |
| Engine 7 | | Haz-Mat 1 | Battalion Chief 1 | 1 | 241 W. Market St. | University Heights |
| Engine 9 | | | Battalion Chief 3 | 3 | 197 Summer Ave. | Mount Pleasant |
| Engine 10 | Ladder 5 | Rescue 1, Rescue 2 (Metro USAR Collapse Rescue Strike Team Unit), Special Operations Support Unit, Headquarters 52 (Arson Unit) | Battalion Chief 4 | 4 | 360 Clinton Ave. | South Broad Valley |
| Engine 11 | Ladder 11 | Haz-Mat. Decon Unit, Haz-Mat. Spill Unit | | 1 | 345 S. 9th St. | Fairmount |
| Engine 13 | Tower Ladder 6 | Medical Ambulance Bus 10 | | 3 | 718 Mt. Prospect Ave. | Forest Hill |
| Engine 14 | | Quick Attack Response Vehicle 1(QRV) | | 5 | 71 Vesey St. | South Ironbound |
| Engine 15 | Ladder 7 | | | 3 | 271 Park Ave. | Lower Roseville |
| Engine 16 | Ladder 8 | Urban Flood Unit & Rescue Boat 16(Zodiac) | | 5 | 473 Ferry St. | North Ironbound |
| Engine 18 | | Foam Unit 1 | Battalion Chief 2 (Safety Battalion Chief) | 4 | 395 Avon Ave. | West Side |
| Engine 19 | | Brush Fire Unit 1, Urban Flood Unit & Rescue Boat 19(Zodiac) | | 5 | 528 Frelinghuysen Ave. | Dayton |
| Engine 26 | Ladder 12 | | Battalion Chief 6 (Special Operations Battalion Chief) | 1 | 420 Sanford Ave. | Vailsburg |
| Engine 27 | Ladder 4 | | Battalion Chief 5 | 5 | 89 Elm Rd. | South Ironbound |
| Engine 28 | | | | 3 | 691 N. 6th St. | Upper Roseville |
| Engine 29 | Ladder 10 | | | 4 | 1028 Bergen St. | Weequahic |
| | | Marine Unit 1, Marine Unit 2 (Fireboats) | | 6 | Port St. & Corbin St. | Port Newark |

=== Disbanded Fire Companies ===
Below is a list of NFD fire companies that have been disbanded due to budget cuts or departmental reorganization:

- Engine 1 - 188 Mulberry St. - Disbanded 1980
- Engine 2 - 39 Centre St. - Disbanded 1974
- Engine 3 - 188 Mulberry St. - Disbanded 1956
- Engine 4 - 241 High St. - Disbanded 1985
- Engine 8 - 296 Ferry St. - Disbanded 1997
- Engine 12 - 360 Clinton Ave. - Disbanded 2010
- Engine 17 - 86 Clinton Pl. - Disbanded 2006
- Engine 20 - 15 Prince St. - Disbanded 1974
- Engine 21 - 420 Sanford Ave. - Disbanded 2006
- Engine 22 - 199 New St. - Disbanded 1956
- Engine 23 - 44 Mt. Prospect Ave. - Disbanded 1957
- Engine 24 - 188 Mulberry St. - Disbanded 1943
- Engine 25 - 395 Avon Ave. - Disbanded 1933
- Engine 30 - 44 Mt. Prospect Ave. - Disbanded 1933
- Engine 31 - 69 Vesey St. - Disbanded 1935
- Engine 32 - 270 Port St. - Disbanded 1983
- Ladder 1 - 191 Orange St. - Disbanded 2010
- Ladder 2 - 241 High St. - Disbanded 1982
- Ladder 3 - 241 W. Market St. - Disbanded 1980
- Ladder 9 - 395 Avon Ave. - Disbanded 2006
- Battalion 4-1 - 395 Avon Ave. - Disbanded 1972
- Deputy 2 - 65 Congress St. - Disbanded 1994
- Deputy 3 - 44 Mt. Prospect Ave. - Disbanded 1974
- Water Tower 1 - 39 Centre St. - Disbanded 1944
- Searchlight 1 - 56 Prospect St. - Disbanded 1969
- Salvage 1 - 65 Congress St. - Disbanded 1972
- Salvage 2 - 213 Belmont Ave. - Disbanded 1972
- Tactical Unit 1 - 15 Prince St. - Disbanded 1980
- Tactical Unit 2 - 241 W. Market St. - Disbanded 1976
