= Henry Moskowitz =

Henry Moskowitz may refer to:

- Henry Moskowitz (activist) (1875–1936), civil rights activist
- Henry Moskowitz (real estate investor) (1905–2008), New York-based real estate investor
