= Oheb Shalom Congregation =

Conservative Jewish synagogue in New Jersey, United States

- Location in Essex County, New Jersey

Religion
- Affiliation: Conservative Judaism
- Ecclesiastical or organisational status: Synagogue
- Leadership: Rabbi Abigail Treu
- Status: Active

Location
- Location: 170 Scotland Road, South Orange, Essex County, New Jersey
- Country: United States
- Administration: United Synagogue of Conservative Judaism
- Coordinates: 40°44′55″N 74°15′18″W

Architecture
- Established: 1860 (as a congregation)
- Completed: 1884 (Prince Street); 1911 (High Street); 1958 (Scotland Road)

Website
- ohebshalom.org
- Prince Street Synagogue
- New Jersey Register of Historic Places No. 1299
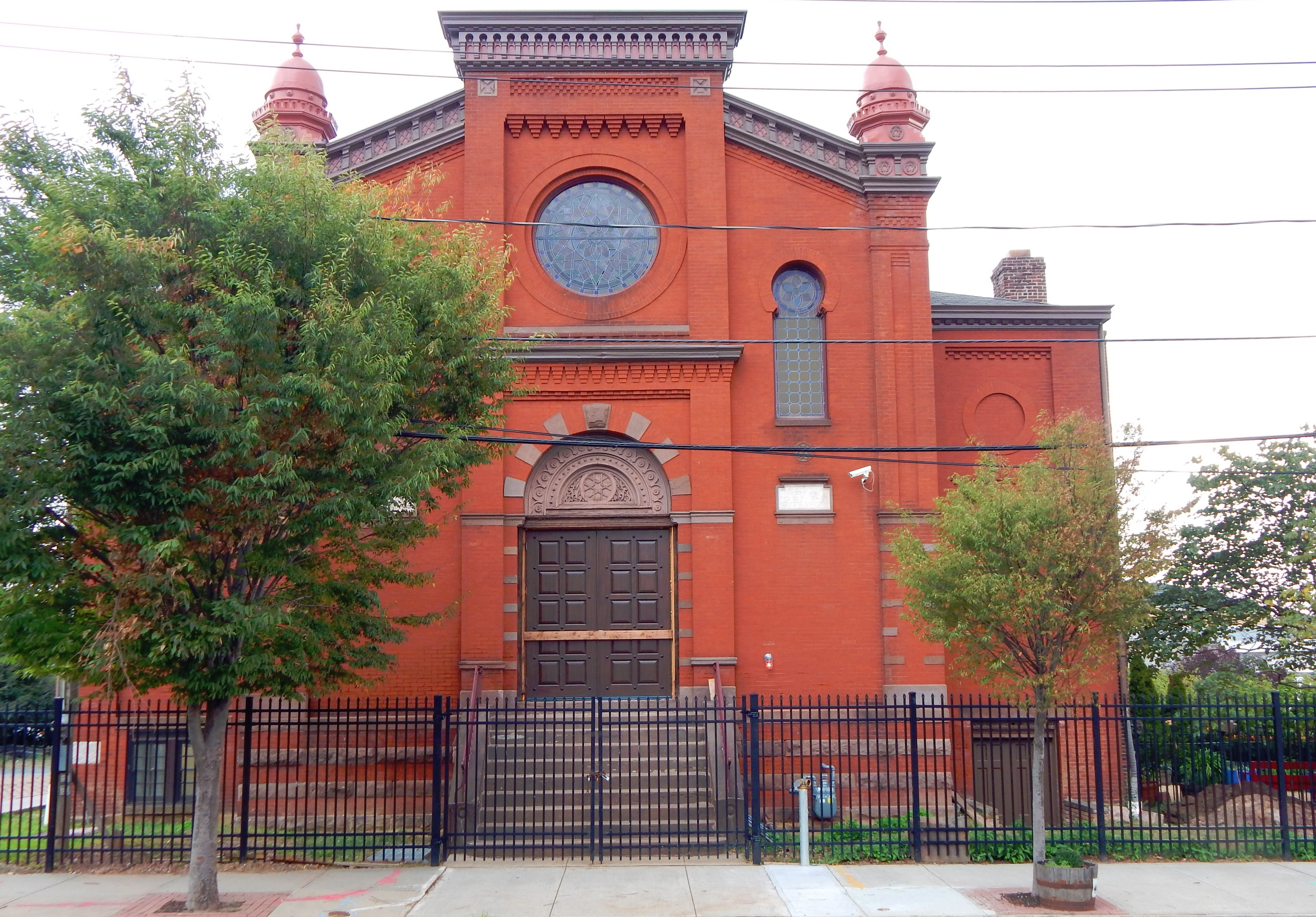
- Former Prince Street Synagogue, in 2018
- Location: 32 Prince Street, Springfield/Belmont, Newark, Essex County, New Jersey
- Coordinates: 40°44′10″N 74°11′07″W
- NJRHP No.: 1299
- Designated NJRHP: January 16, 1990

Oheb Shalom Congregation (transliterated from Hebrew as 'Lovers of Peace') is an egalitarian, Conservative Jewish congregation and synagogue located in South Orange, Essex County, New Jersey, in the United States. The synagogue is affiliated with the United Synagogue of Conservative Judaism.

Its historic former synagogue building, built in 1884, located on Price Street, is one of the oldest synagogues in the United States and was listed on the New Jersey Register of Historic Places in 1990.

== History ==
The congregation was founded in Newark in September 1860 by a group of Bohemian Jews, the congregation's members have lived in and served Essex County and the broader community for over 160 years.

The modest Moorish Revival building at 32 Prince Street in the Springfield/Belmont neighborhood was built in 1884. It is one of the oldest synagogues in the United States.

Documentation records note Prince Street in Newark as a being one of the earliest, relatively clandestine places of Jewish settlement and worship (primarily Sephardic Jews of Spanish, Portuguese, or Italian descent) in the colonial and early American eras. The later arriving Ashkenazi Jews of Newark accommodated to the areas in and around Prince Street, named for one of the original anglicized Sephardic family names.

In 1911, the congregation moved to High Street (later renamed Dr. Martin Luther King, Jr. Blvd.) and subsequently relocated to Scotland Road in South Orange in 1958.

The Prince Street building served as the home of the Metropolitan Baptist Church from 1940 to 1993. In 1990 it was slated for destruction as part of land clearance to enable the construction of Newark's Society Hill housing development. Mark W. Gordon, a historic preservationis, led a movement to preserve the historic building.

It was restored by Greater Newark Conservancy and is now used as an environmental center. It was listed on the New Jersey Register of Historic Places on January 16, 1990. The brick synagogue features windows with Horseshoe arches, an entrance arch with red and white Voussoirs, and twin towers topped by modest domes.

The rabbi, since July 2021, is Rabbi Abigail Treu; and the cantor is Eliana Kissner.

== See also ==
- List of the oldest buildings in New Jersey
- Jewish Museum of New Jersey at Ahavas Sholom
- Congregation Adas Emuno (New Jersey)
- Woodbine Brotherhood Synagogue
