= Garden of the Righteous Among the Nations =

Garden in Jerusalem, Israel

Coordinates: 31.7734°N 35.1722°E

- Yad Vashem
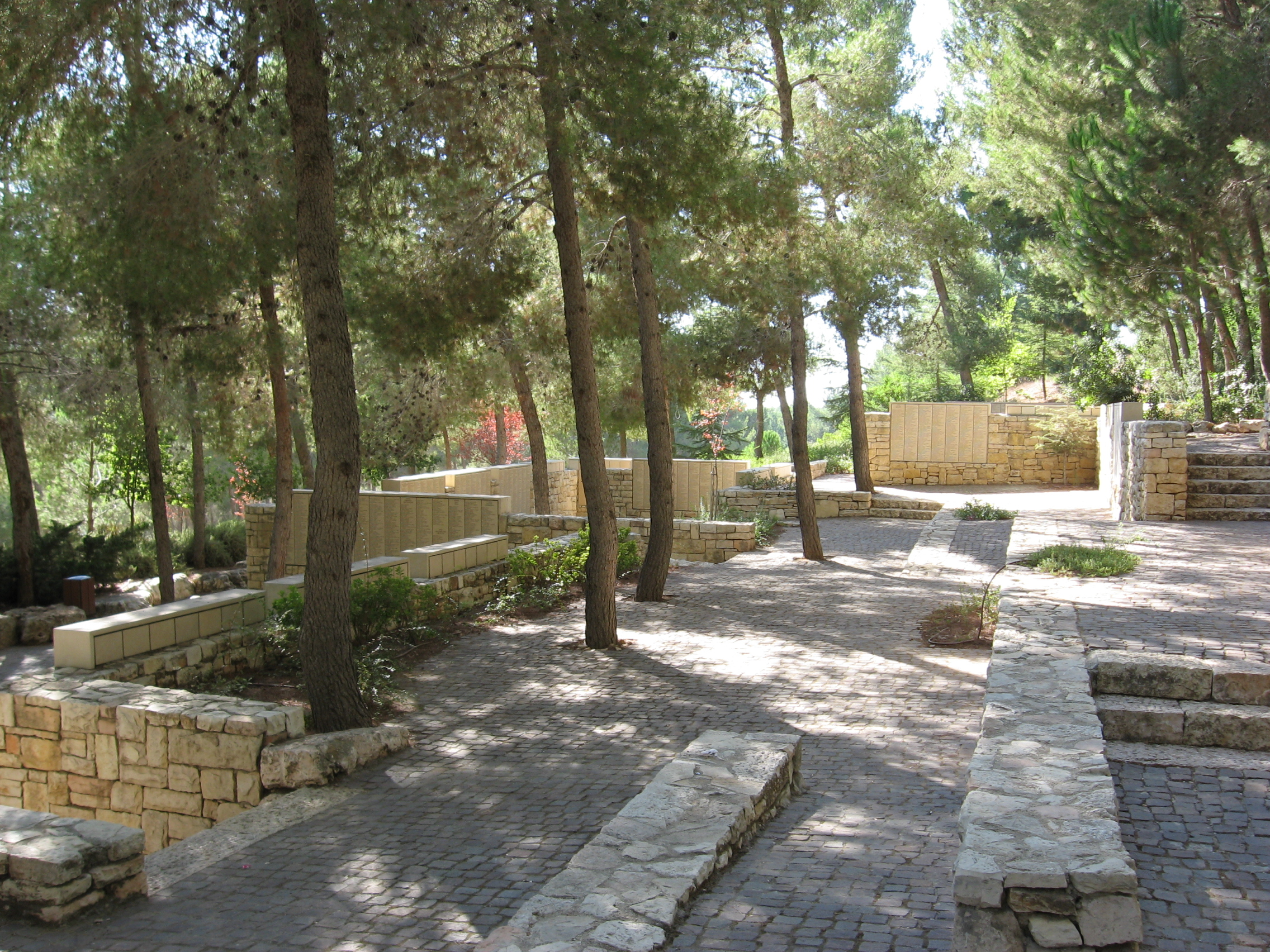
- The Garden of the Righteous with Wall of Honor in the background

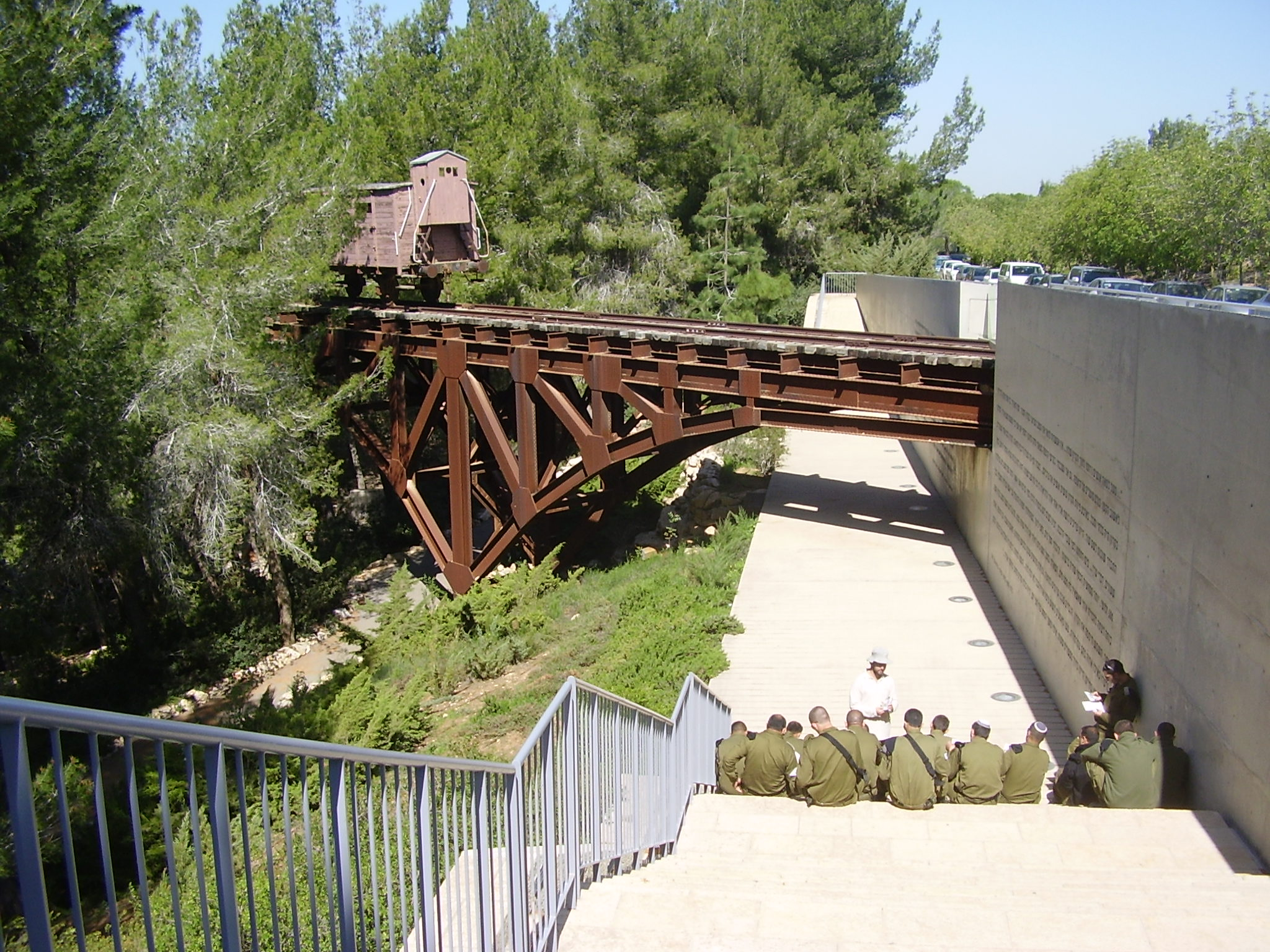
- The Cattle Car Memorial to the Deportees adjacent to the Garden of the Righteous

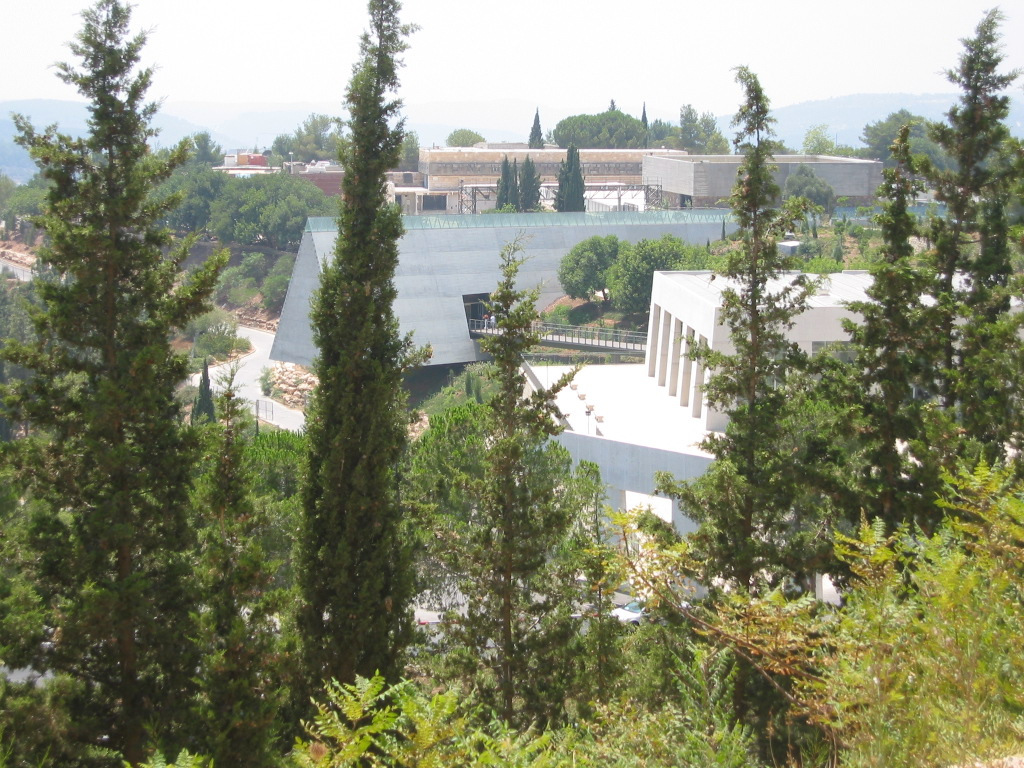
- Panorama of Yad Vashem complex.

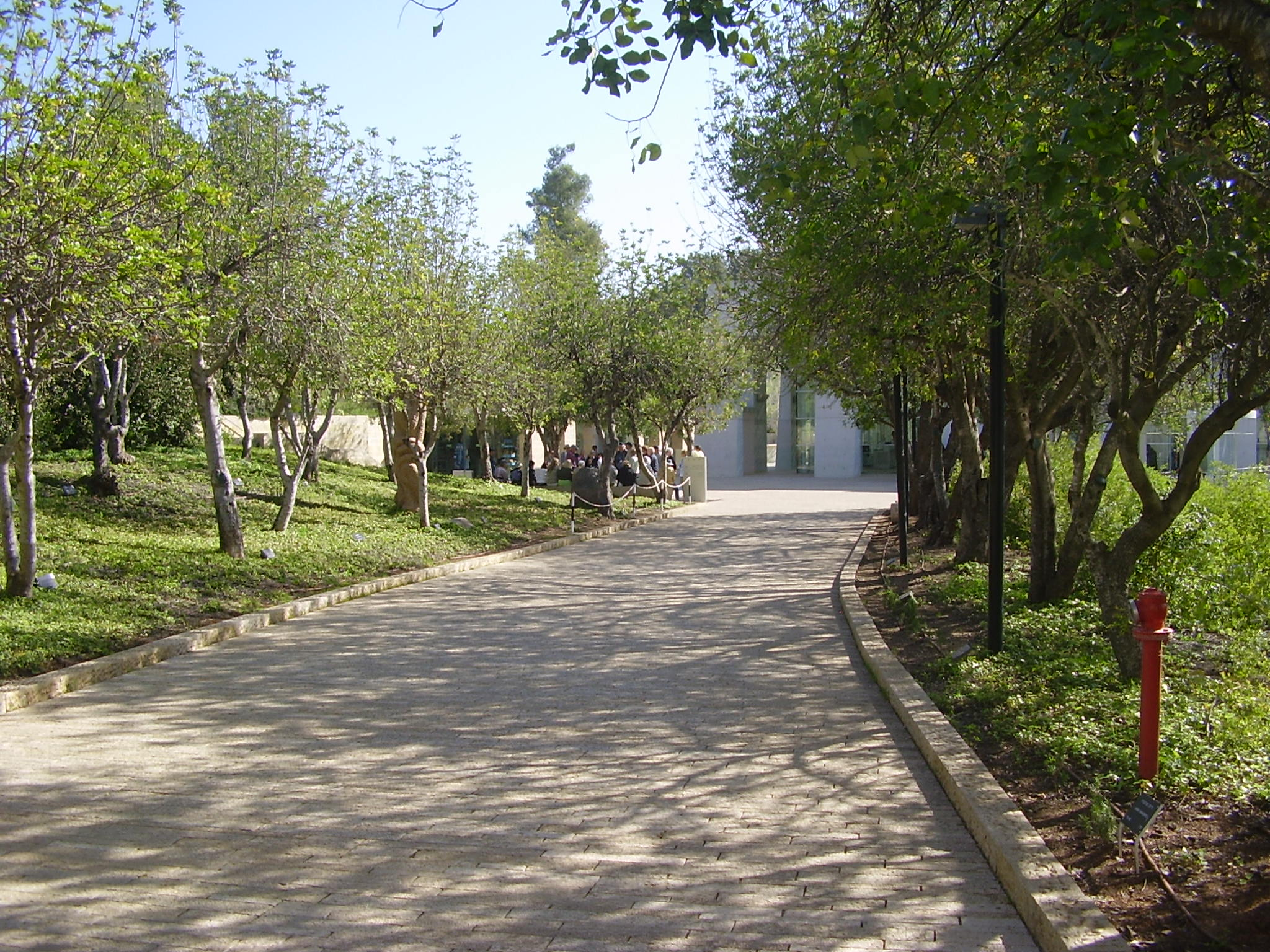
- The Avenue of the Righteous

The Garden of the Righteous Among the Nations (Hebrew: גַן חֲסִידִי אוּמות הָעוֹלָם) is part of the much larger Yad Vashem complex located on the Mount of Remembrance in Jerusalem. Along with some two dozen different structures within the Yad Vashem memorial – which is the second most-visited destination in the country after the Western Wall – the Garden of the Righteous is meant to honor those non-Jews who during the Holocaust risked their lives to save Jews from extermination by the Nazis.

The Garden was designed by landscape architects Lipa Yahalom and Dan Zur after a decision to construct a memorial where the names of the Righteous Among the Nations would be perpetuated. A site integrated into the natural surroundings of the hills, the Garden consists of a series of walls creating open rooms, where the names of all the Righteous who had no trees planted in their honor are engraved in alphabetical order on the walls according to their countries of origin. By the time the Garden was dedicated on August 7, 1996, close to 14,000 Righteous had been honored by Yad Vashem. Since then new names are being added every year. In 2011, the Garden was expanded and new walls were constructed.

The entire site receives one million visitors annually.

== Background ==
The Garden of the Righteous initiative was launched in 1992 by Rabbi Jeffrey Wohlberg. Around the site trees are planted everywhere, with plaques attached to each one with names and countries of origin of those being honored. They are most prominent in the Avenue of the Righteous Among the Nations (also pictured) meant specifically for that purpose, with around 2,000 trees.

Other points of interest in the complex aside from the Garden include: the Visitors' Center, Book and Resource Center, the Holocaust History Museum, the Hall of Names, the Square of Hope, the Holocaust Art Museum, the Synagogue, the Exhibitions Pavilion, the Visual Center, the Learning Center, Hall of Remembrance, Pillar of Heroism, Children's Memorial, Janusz Korczak Square, Archives and Library Building, Family Plaza, International School for Holocaust Studies, Administration and Research Building, Monument to the Jewish Soldiers, Partisans' Panorama, Valley of the Communities, the Cattle Car Memorial to the Deportees, Warsaw Ghetto Square, the Wall of Remembrance and others.

== Commitment ==
The Garden prominently features the Wall of Honor for each country on which the names of the Righteous are inscribed. Also, the ceremonies of granting the awards are held in the Garden. There are three degrees of reverence granted to rescuers including those already deceased and their relatives; the presentation of the Title usually in the recipient's country by an ambassador, a special Medal in their name with Diploma awarded in Jerusalem, and the planting of a tree in the Garden of the Righteous. In 2010, the Square of Hope was dedicated in the honor of New York and Israeli real estate investor Henry Moscowitz.

== Notes and references ==
- "The gardens of the Righteous". The virtual Gardens of Europe's Righteous. Gariwo.
