= Jewish Museum of New Jersey =

- Ahavas Sholom
- U.S. National Register of Historic Places
- New Jersey Register of Historic Places
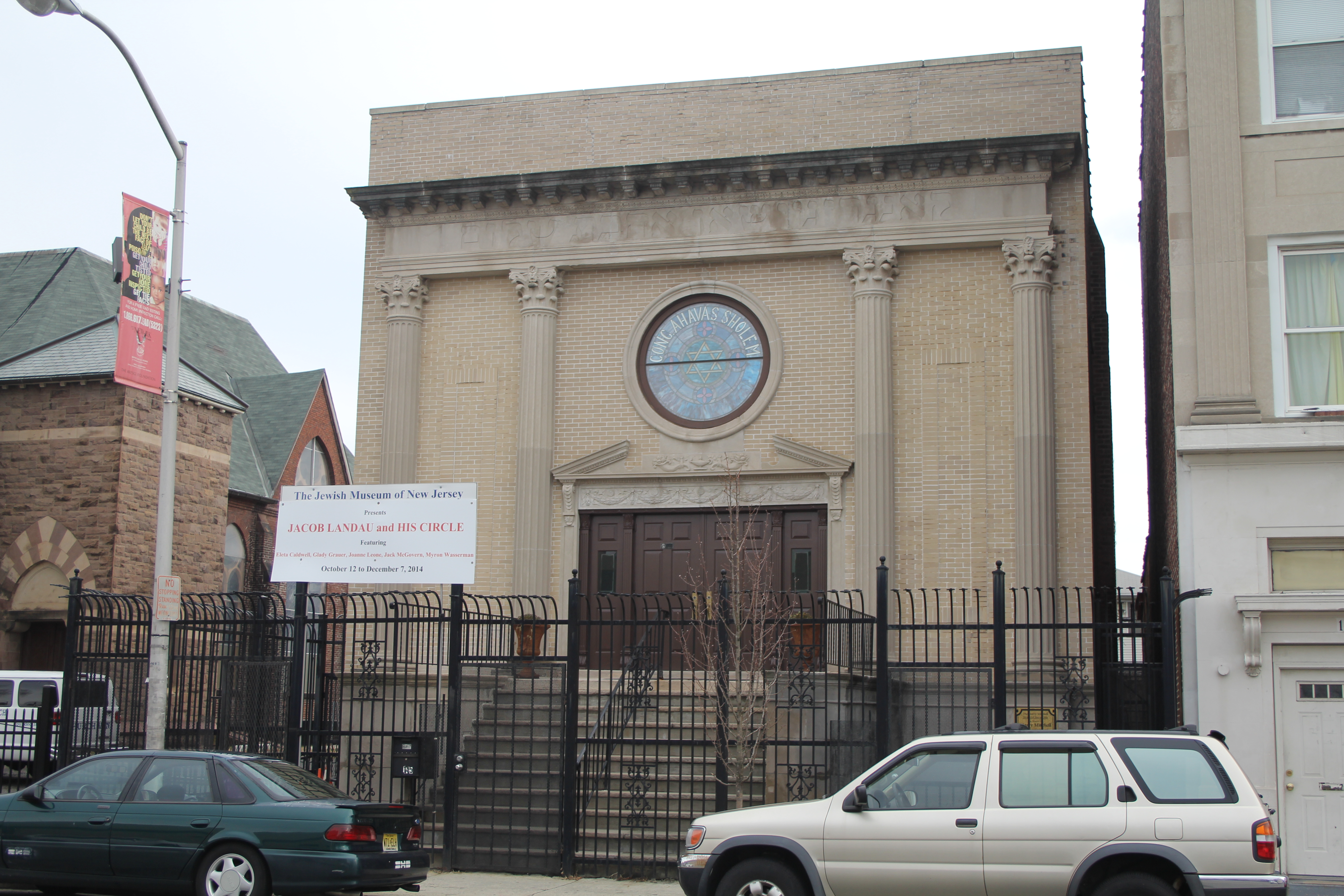
- Ahavas Sholom building in 2014

- Location within Essex County, New Jersey Location within New Jersey Location within the United States
- Location: 145 Broadway; Newark, New Jersey
- Coordinates: 40°45′19″N 74°10′12″W
- Area: 0.1 acres (0.040 ha)
- Built: 1923
- Architectural style: Classical Revival
- NRHP reference No.: 00001530
- NJRHP No.: 3702

Significant dates
- Added to NRHP: December 13, 2000
- Designated NJRHP: November 6, 2000

The Jewish Museum of New Jersey, at Ahavas Sholom, is located at 145 Broadway in Newark, Essex County, New Jersey, United States.

The Museum was founded in 2003 and the museum's inaugural opening was in 2007. The historic building in the Broadway neighborhood is the longest continually operating synagogue in the city. It was built in 1923 and added to the National Register of Historic Places on December 13, 2000, for its significance in art, religion, and social history. The two-story brick building features Classical Revival architecture. It is one of fifty synagogues that once stood in Newark, serving a Jewish population of 70,000, once the sixth largest Jewish community in the United States.

From the gallery space of the Museum, one has a view of the majestic Aron Kodesh, or Holy Ark. Constructed in the 1870s for Congregation Beth-El, later Rodeph Sholom, at their second location on Lexington Avenue and 63rd Street in New York City, the hand-carved wooden Aron Kodesh was installed at its present location in Newark in the 1920s and is the oldest in the state of New Jersey.

The Museum creates and curates rotating and traveling exhibitions, utilizing photographs, paintings, panel displays, artifacts, text, music and multi-media. The Museum also features topics such as local Holocaust survivors, Jewish Immigration in the state, and history of Sephardim in New Jersey. The Museum is open for special exhibits and programs, as well as by appointment.

New Jersey has the fourth largest Jewish population in the country and it can trace back its Jewish roots to the 17th century. Mr. Joseph Selzer, the founder and former board president had taken a visit to the Jewish Museum of Florida which is located in a restored 1936 synagogue. Selzer realized that despite New Jersey having such a high population of a practicing Jewish population, there was no Jewish museum to preserve the state's Jewish history.

There are over one-half million Jewish people in New Jersey and the creation of the museum will create the first centralized location with permanent, rotating, and traveling installations for the research, presentation, and exhibition of more than 400 years of Jewish History in New Jersey.

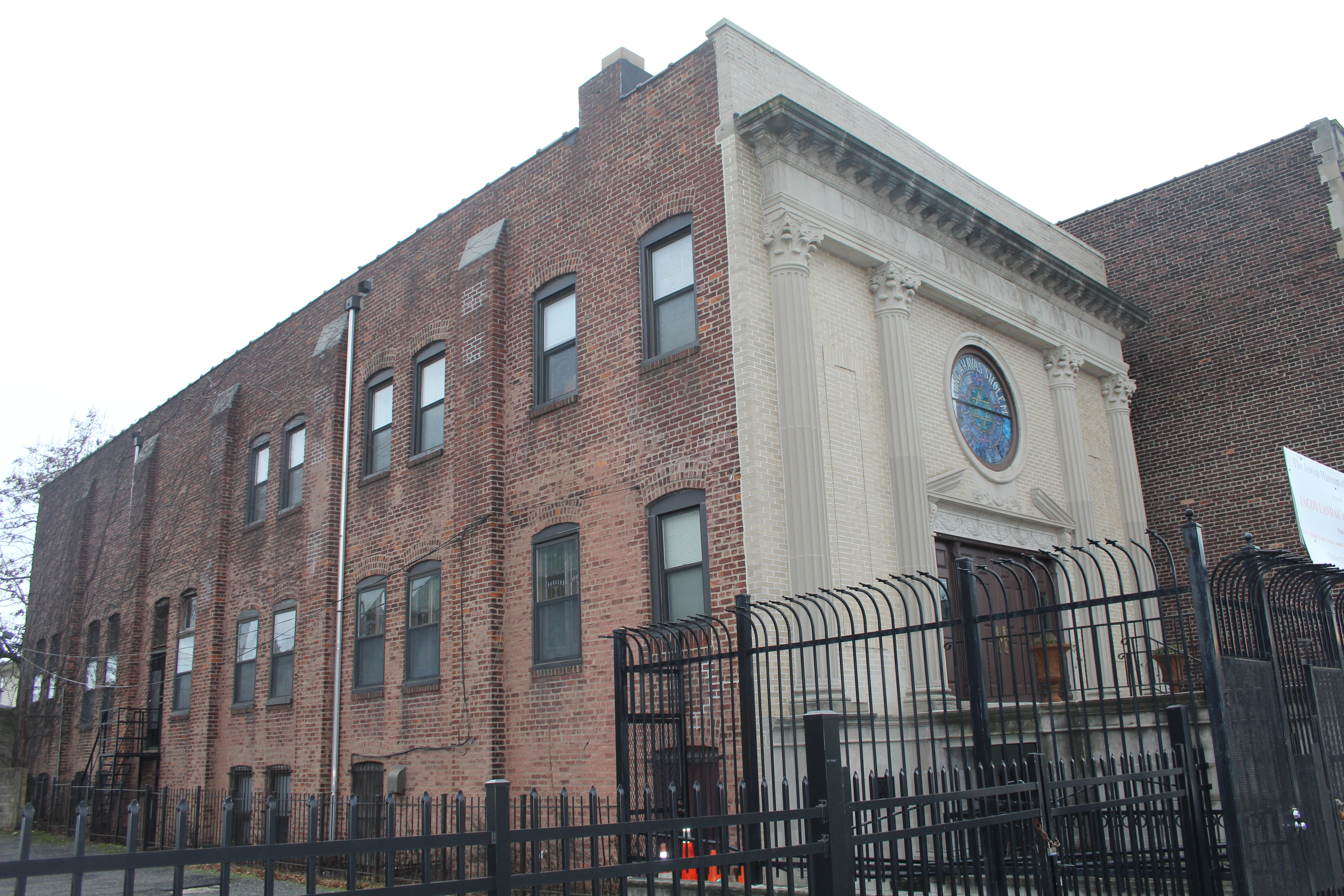
Side view

== See also ==
- Prince Street Synagogue
- National Register of Historic Places listings in Essex County, New Jersey
- Newark Museum
- New Jersey Historical Society
