= Clinton Hill, Newark =

Populated place in Essex County, New Jersey, US

Coordinates: 40°43′04″N 74°11′51″W

Clinton Hill is a neighborhood within the south-central portion of the city of Newark in Essex County, New Jersey. It takes its name from the no-longer extant Clinton Township, of which the neighborhood was once part. Its main thoroughfare is Clinton Avenue. It is roughly bounded by Irvington to the west, Interstate 78/Weequahic to the south and Avon Avenue/Springfield/Belmont to the north. At Elizabeth Avenue it overlaps South Broad Valley.

== Upper Clinton Hill ==
Upper Clinton Hill is predominantly residential, with many of the homes also being the offices of professionals. Most retail activity along Clinton and Hawthorne Avenues with a shopping centers on Chancellor Avenue and nearby Springfield Ave. Nearest to the commercial streets, the housing is largely two- and three-family conversions, while the interior streets include many large, well-maintained single-family houses. To the south, near I-78, are several vacant and abandoned properties. There is some light industry in the southeastern part of the neighborhood. Upper Clinton Hill neighborhood was served by the Newark Public Library's Madison branch until 2010 when it was closed due to budget cuts. Woodland Cemetery lies its northern edge.

The Newark Police Department is headquartered in Upper Clinton Hill.

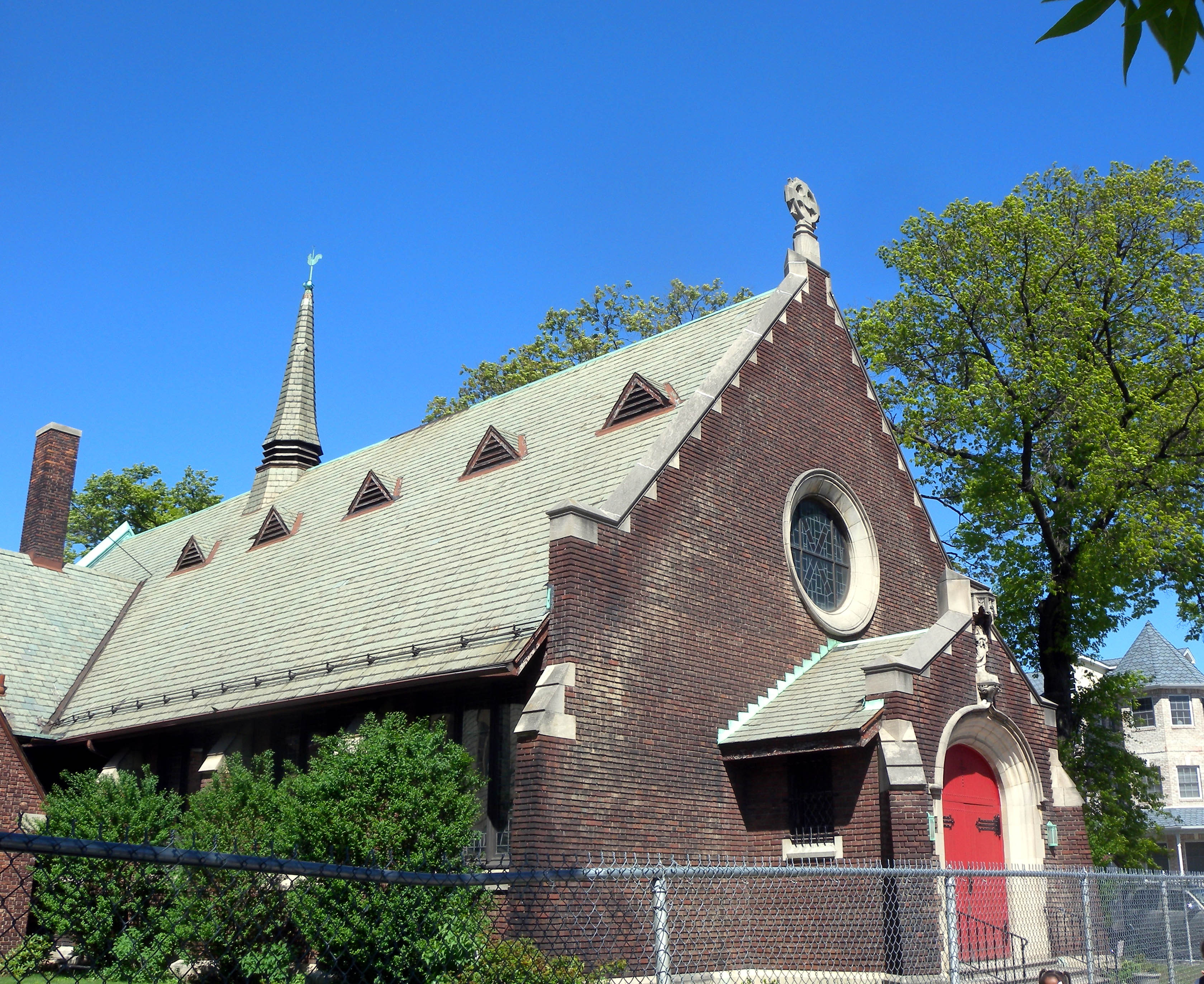
St Andrews

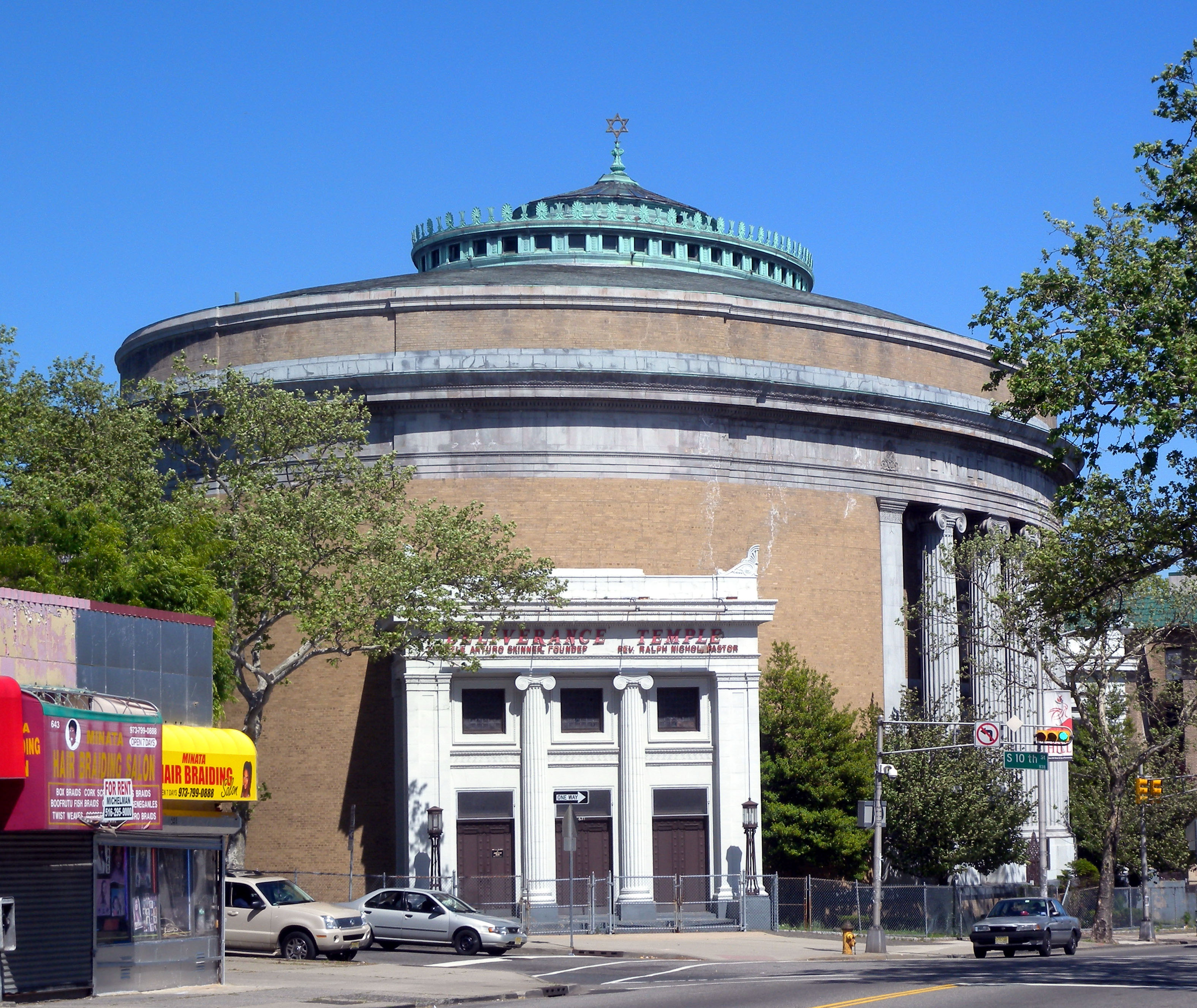
Bnai Abraham Deliverance Temple, a former synagogue on Clinton Avenue

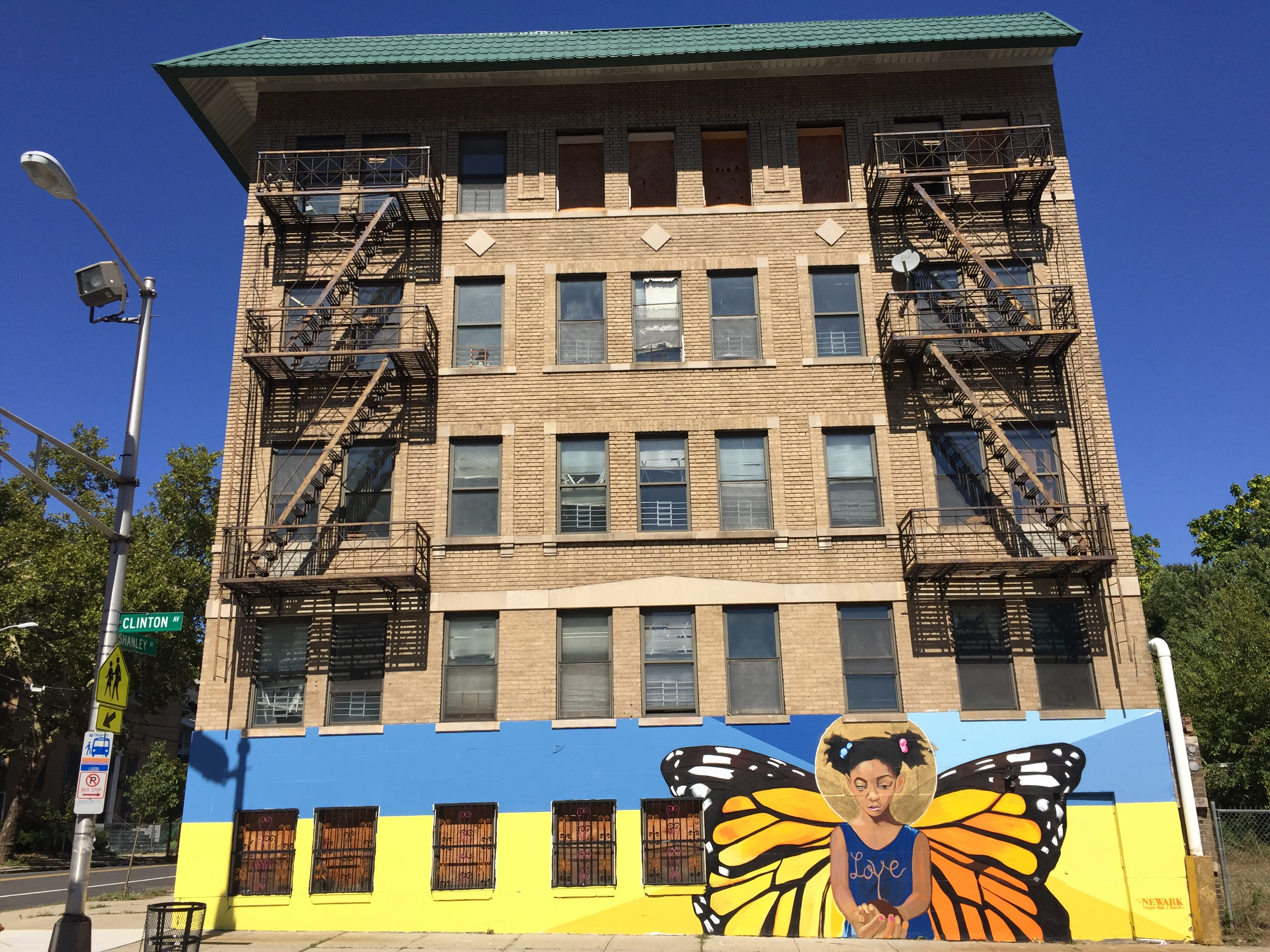
Clinton at Shanley Street

=== Hawthorne Hill ===
Hawthorne Hill is the southwest section of Upper Clinton Hill.

== Lower Clinton Hill ==
Newark's highest concentration of vacant land and empty buildings can be found in the Lower Clinton Hill neighborhood, much of it cleared of all but a few clusters of older residences. For example, M&M's first factory was at 285 Badger Avenue and is now a vacant lot. There is some commercial activity along Avon Avenue and at the intersection of Peddie Street and Elizabeth Avenue and a scattering of small, convenience-oriented businesses on Clinton Avenue and Bergen Street. The Lower Clinton Hill neighborhood was served by the Newark Public Library's Clinton branch before its closure in 2021. The Gant-Gilbert Arts Collective opened in 2022.

=== South Broad Valley ===
South Broad Valley, or simply South Broad Street, is a small mostly residential area at the eastside of Lower Clinton Hill, south of Lincoln Park. It is bordered by the McCarter Highway/Northeast Corridor Line on the east and Interstate 78 at the south. Malcolm X Shabazz High School is in neighborhood.

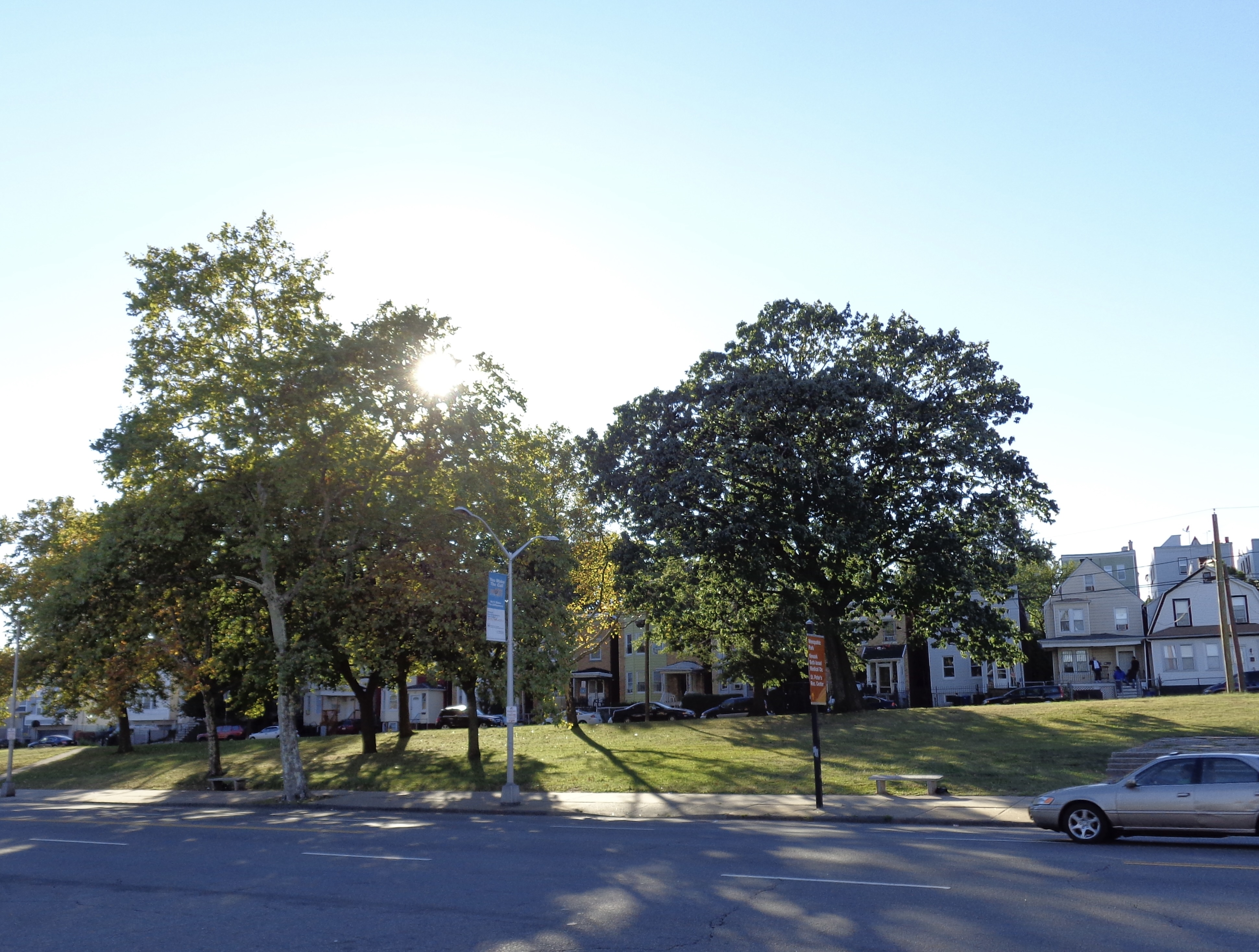
SchieflerPark on Elizabeth Avenue

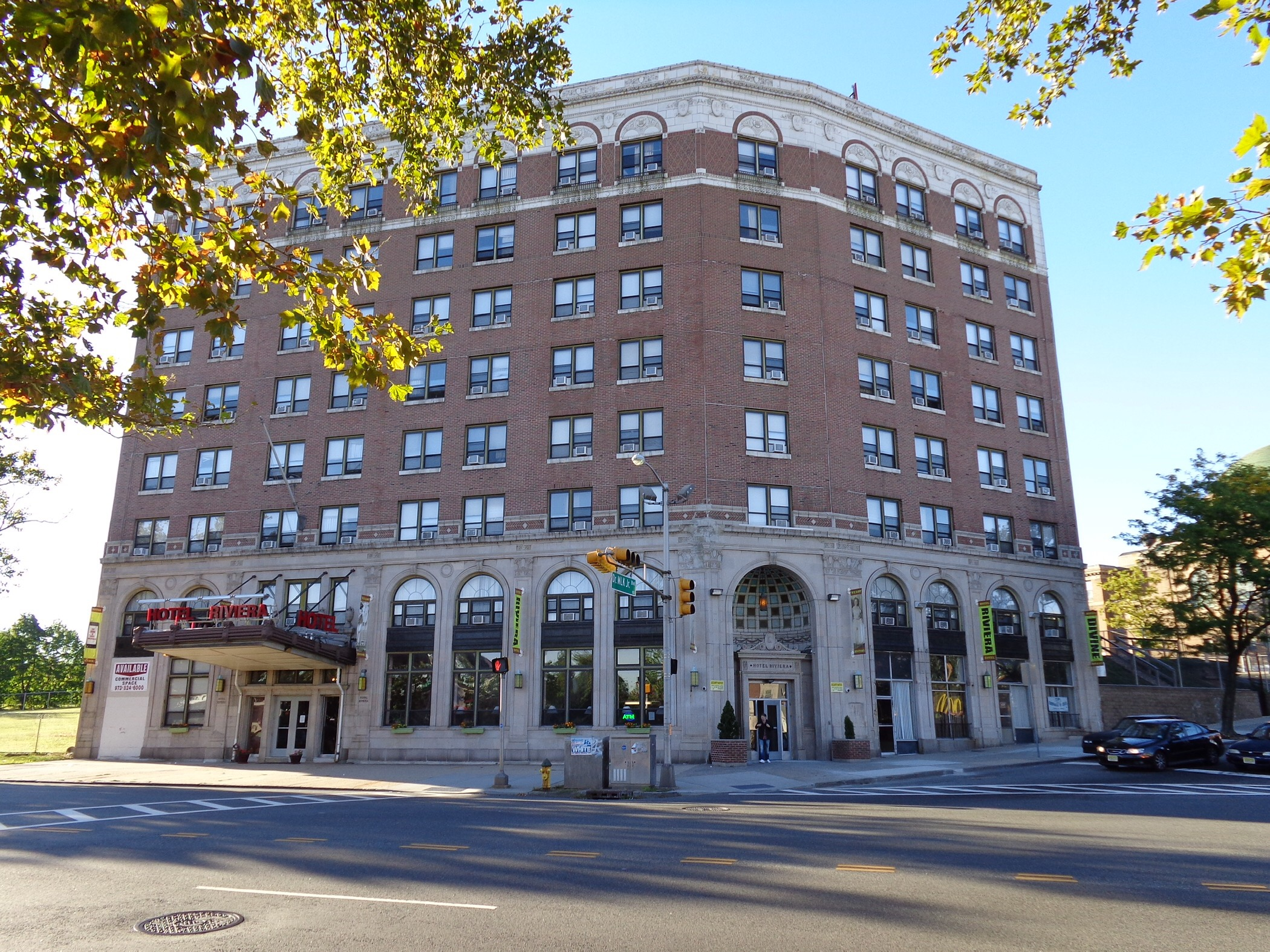
Riveria Hotel on Clinton Avenue

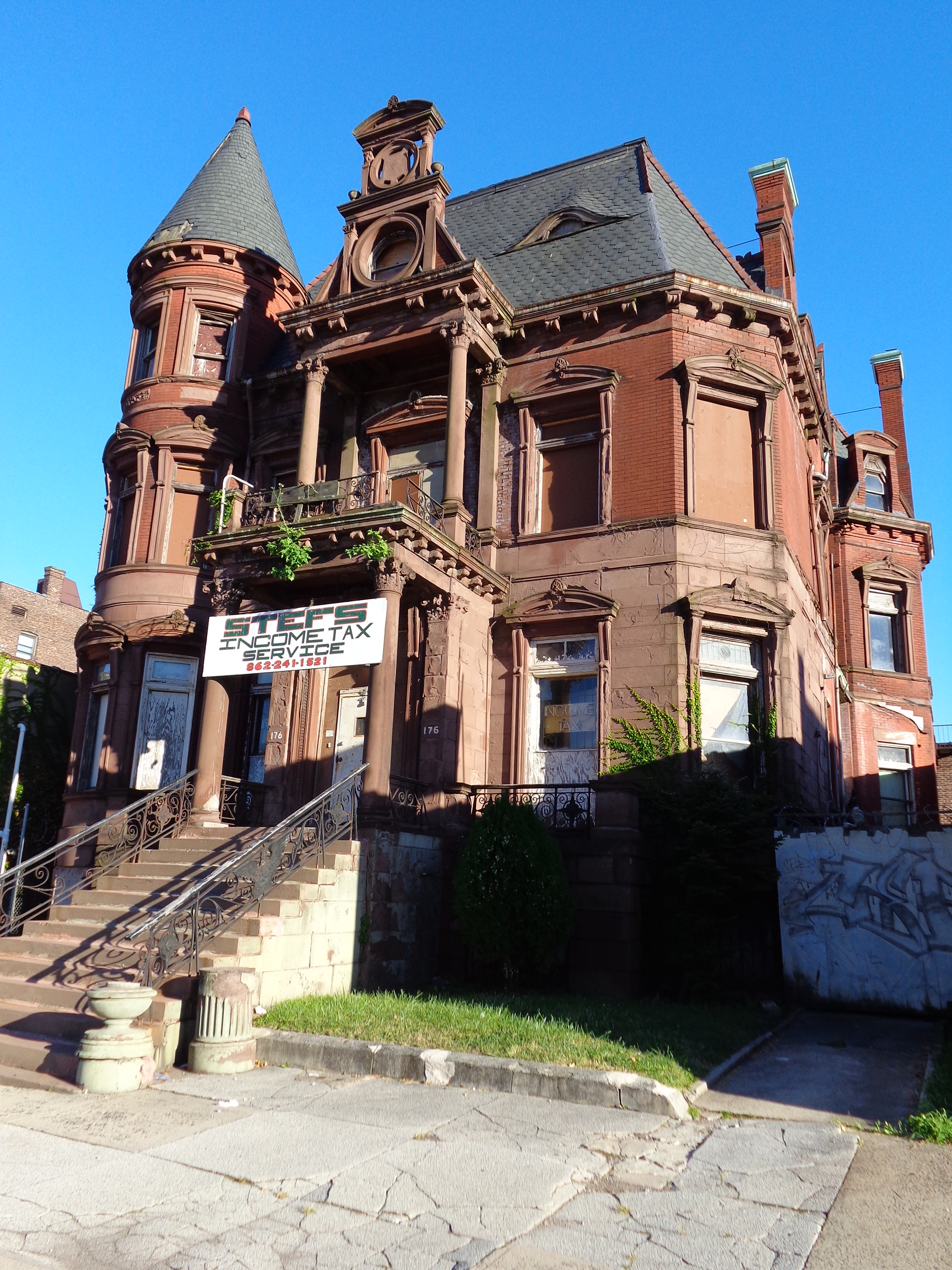
Former Kastner Mansion on Clinton

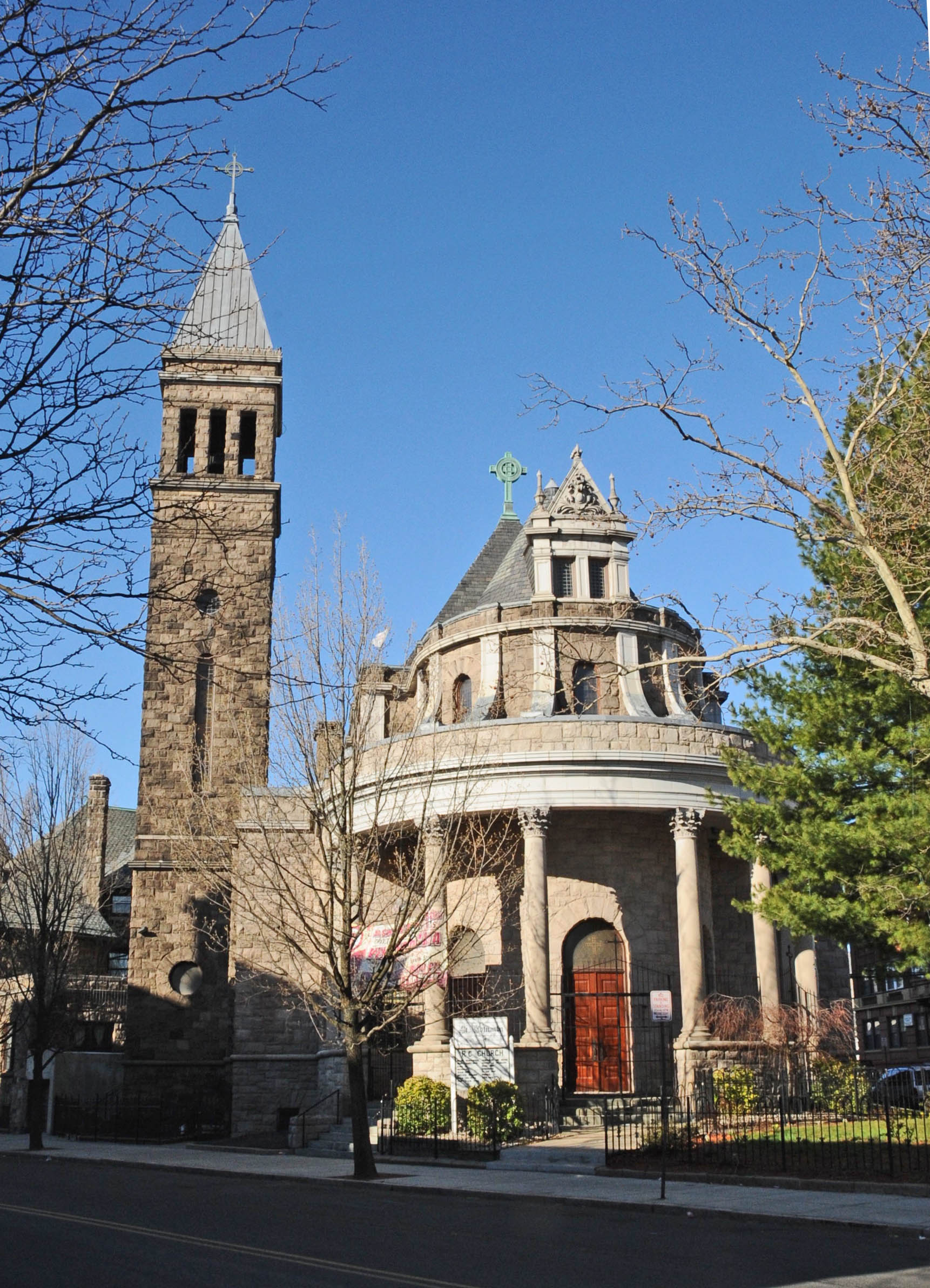
Saint Columba's Church

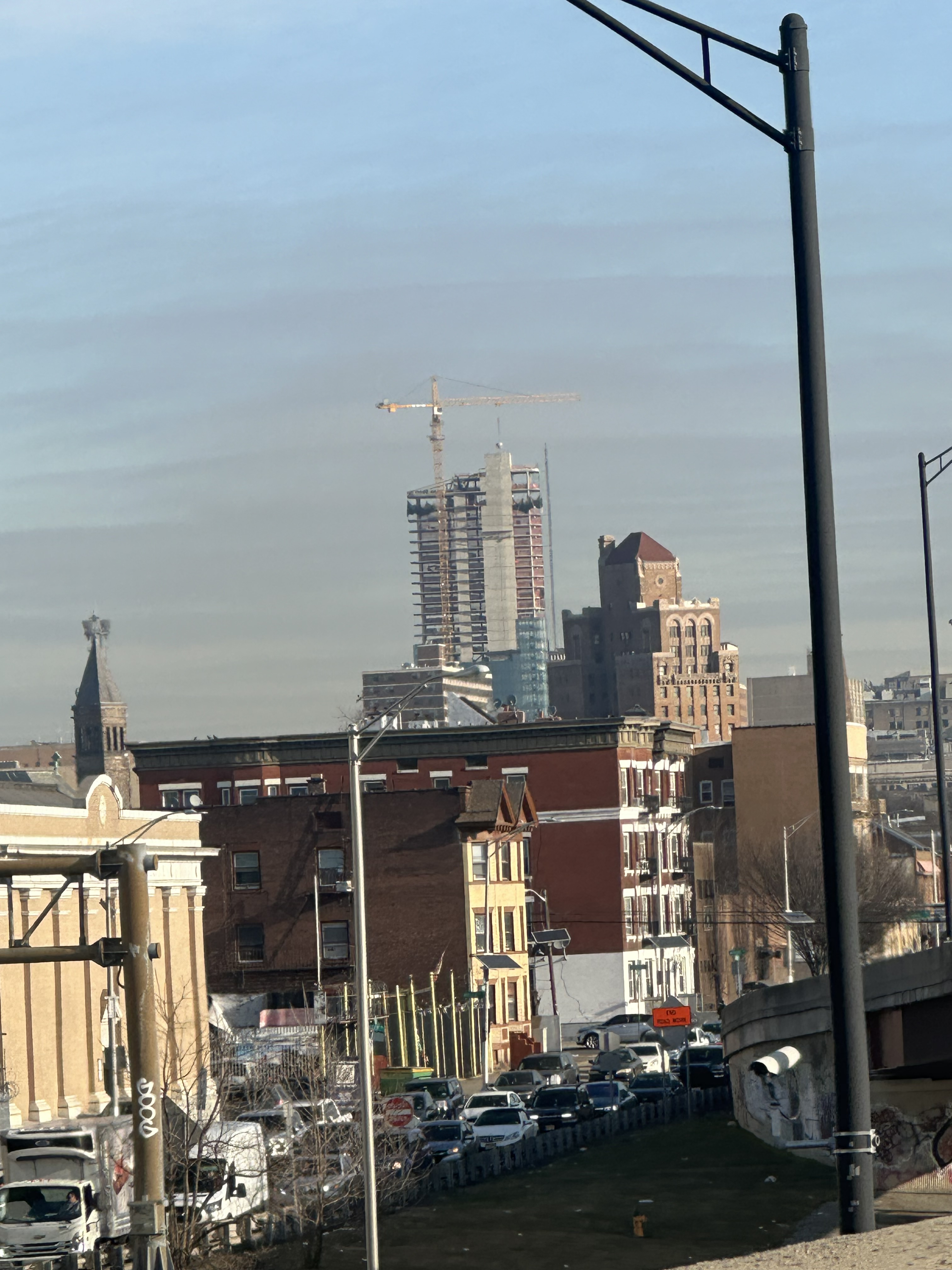
End of South Broad Street

== History ==
A three-block long street that extends from Runyon St. is called Tillinghast Street, believed named after Philip Tillinghast, who moved there in 1854 or early 1855 with his family of seven children from Manhattan. Philip was a well-to-do commission merchant and broker who worked in the Wall Street area and lived near fashionable Washington Square in the 1840s. As commercialization and immigration overtook such Dutch and English Old New York Protestant neighborhoods, wealthy families moved further uptown into free-standing mansions or townhouses made of newly discovered chocolate sandstone (Brownstone) from Paterson, New Jersey.

Others were influenced by writers like Andrew Jackson Downing and Davis who advocated villa living in semi-rural areas in the Bronx, Brooklyn, Staten Island, and the Orange area of New Jersey, where Llewellyn Park was created in West Orange. Tillinghast also joined the land speculators during this era to establish a suburban enclave of wealthy families in what was then Clinton Township. His home, thought to be called Hawthorn Hill, was located in this area with green spaces and punctuated by churches such as St. Andrews Episcopal and First Presbyterian on Clinton Ave. to serve the WASP (white Anglo-Saxon Protestant) population that inhabited the new neighborhood. Philip was ruined in the Panic of 1873.

A daughter, Mary Elizabeth Tillinghast, was a famous embroidery and stained glass window artist (Grace Church, New-York Historical Society, St. Vincent's Hospital chapel) who had been a partner of John La Farge before going on her own. She moved back to NYC after Philip died in 1879, and lived at 3 N. Washington Square, near her old house. When she died in 1912, her studio was taken by Edward Hopper.

Gradually, immigration spread out from Newark and surrounded this enclave, whose inhabitants moved further westward to West Orange (and St. Mark Episcopal church and 'new' Presbyterian church on Main Street). Left behind were mostly lower middle-class Ukrainian-Americans and Jewish-Americans. Now it is mostly African-American.
