= Henry Moskowitz (real estate investor) =

Businessperson

- Born: 1905; Kielce, Poland
- Died: September 7, 2008 (aged 102–103)
- Occupations: Real estate investor and developer
- Known for: Founder of The Argo Corporation
- Spouse: Rose Moskowitz
- Children: Sonia Moskowitz; Jacob Moskowitz; Mark Moskowitz; Dan Moskowitz

Henry Moskowitz (1905 – September 7, 2008) was a New York-based real estate investor and founder of The Argo Corporation. He also contracted and owned hotels in Israel.

== Personal life ==
Moskowitz was born to a Jewish family in Kielce, Poland. He lost his first wife, daughter, both parents, and a brother in the Holocaust. In December 1944, he was interned in the Sachsenhausen concentration camp.

In 1948, he remarried in Germany to his second wife, Rose. They had two children in Germany, Sonia and Jacob. In 1951, the family immigrated to the United States, settling on the Upper West Side of Manhattan and had two more children: Dan and Mark.

In 1998, he was recognized by former Israeli Prime Minister Benjamin Netanyahu with the Foreign Investor Jubilee Award. Although raised Hassidic, after World War II, he practiced Modern Orthodox Judaism.

In 2008, the Broadway Mall Association dedicated the Henry Moskowitz North Mall in his honor. Moskowitz was a strong supporter of Israel. In 2010, the Square of Hope in the Garden of the Righteous Among the Nations at Yad Vashem was dedicated in his honor. He was also a supporter of the Givat Haviva Educational Institute in Israel and the USC Shoah Foundation Institute for Visual History and Education.

== Career ==
In 1952, pooling the assets of over 100 investors, many of them Holocaust survivors, he founded The Argo Corporation and began investing in real estate in New York City. The partnerships' early investments were all rentals and Argo was hired by the partnerships to manage them.

In 1955, he purchased the Ivy Hill Park Apartment complex in the Ivy Hill neighborhood in Newark, New Jersey; the complex consisted of ten fifteen story buildings and was New Jersey's largest privately owned apartment complex.

Argo eventually converted most of its buildings in Manhattan into cooperative ownership during the 1960s and 1970s, typically keeping the management contract thereafter. In the 1980s, the Argo Corp. expanded into third party management of buildings.

In 1997, he made his first condominium conversion. He also owned hotels in Israel.

He grew the business to become one of the largest independent real estate management companies in New York City. As of 2013, Argo owns 5,500 units and manages 6,500 units on behalf of condominiums and cooperatives. In addition to management and the conversion of rental buildings to cooperatives and condominiums, Argo continues to invest in building ownership and also purchases individual unsold units in buildings for rental. His son, Mark Moskowitz, now runs the company. Moskowitz was known for not selling any of his buildings.
