= Fairmount, Newark, New Jersey =

Populated place in Essex County, New Jersey, US

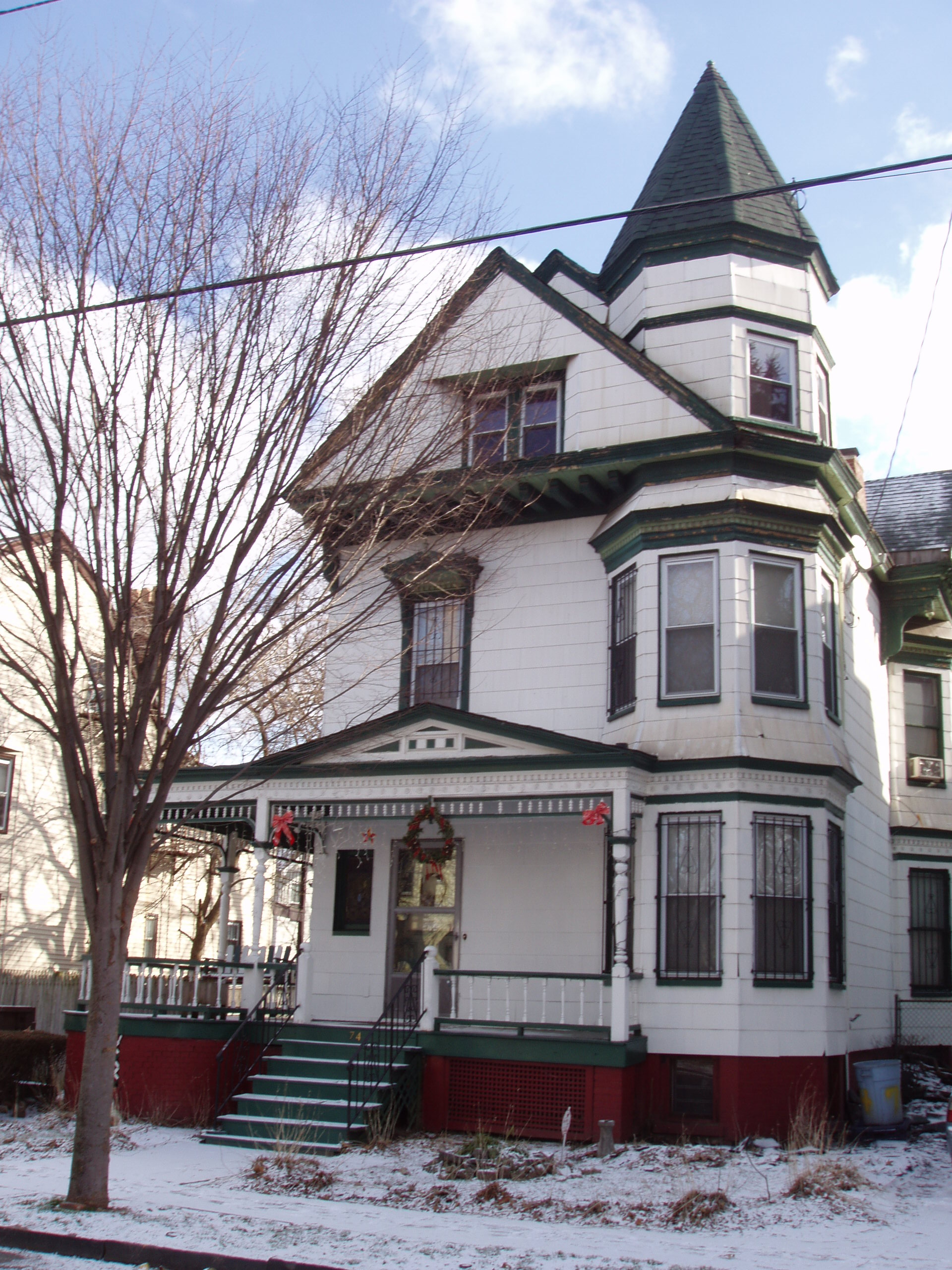
A well-maintained Victorian House in Fairmount

Fairmount is a neighborhood in the city of Newark in Essex County, in the U.S. state of New Jersey. It is part of the West Ward. Its population is mostly African American . Central Avenue is the major street, though its commerce is considerably reduced from the Industrial Era heyday. The neighborhood is bounded by South Orange Avenue on the south, the Garden State Parkway on the west, Interstate 280 on the north, West Market Street on the north-east, and the University of Medicine and Dentistry of New Jersey on the east.

== Landmarks ==
Major landmarks include West Side High School, the 1864 St. Barnabas Episcopal Church at West Market Street and Sussex Avenue and Mosque No. 25 is on South Orange Avenue. The old Pabst Brewing Company brewery was torn down during the mid-2000s.

Holy Sepulchre Cemetery borders the neighborhood at the Garden State Parkway.

=== Fairmount Cemetery ===
This Victorian Fairmount Cemetery, was founded in 1854 and is currently maintained as a nonprofit. According to the cemetery's official website: "In the late 1880’s the remains of early settlers of the City of Newark were removed from the Old Burying Ground located on Broad Street and placed in a tomb at Fairmount Cemetery. The City of Newark erected a Monument to the First Settlers of Newark, which has become commonly known as the Old Settlers Monument. This monument was first dedicated December 19, 1889 and, under the care of the Newark Preservation & Landmark Committee, was rededicated in 2004. The monument stands today as a tribute to the early settlers of the City of Newark."

=== Fairmount Heights Switching Station ===
The Fairmount Heights Switching Station (40°44′48″N 74°11′34″W) was built by Public Service Enterprise Group. The includes public art: a 30 feet (9.1 m) wall of murals and a colonnade with works by Adjaye Associates and 14 others.

== 20 Littleton Avenue ==
A project which combines health care and housing.
