= Woodland Cemetery (Newark, New Jersey) =

Cemetery in Newark, New Jersey

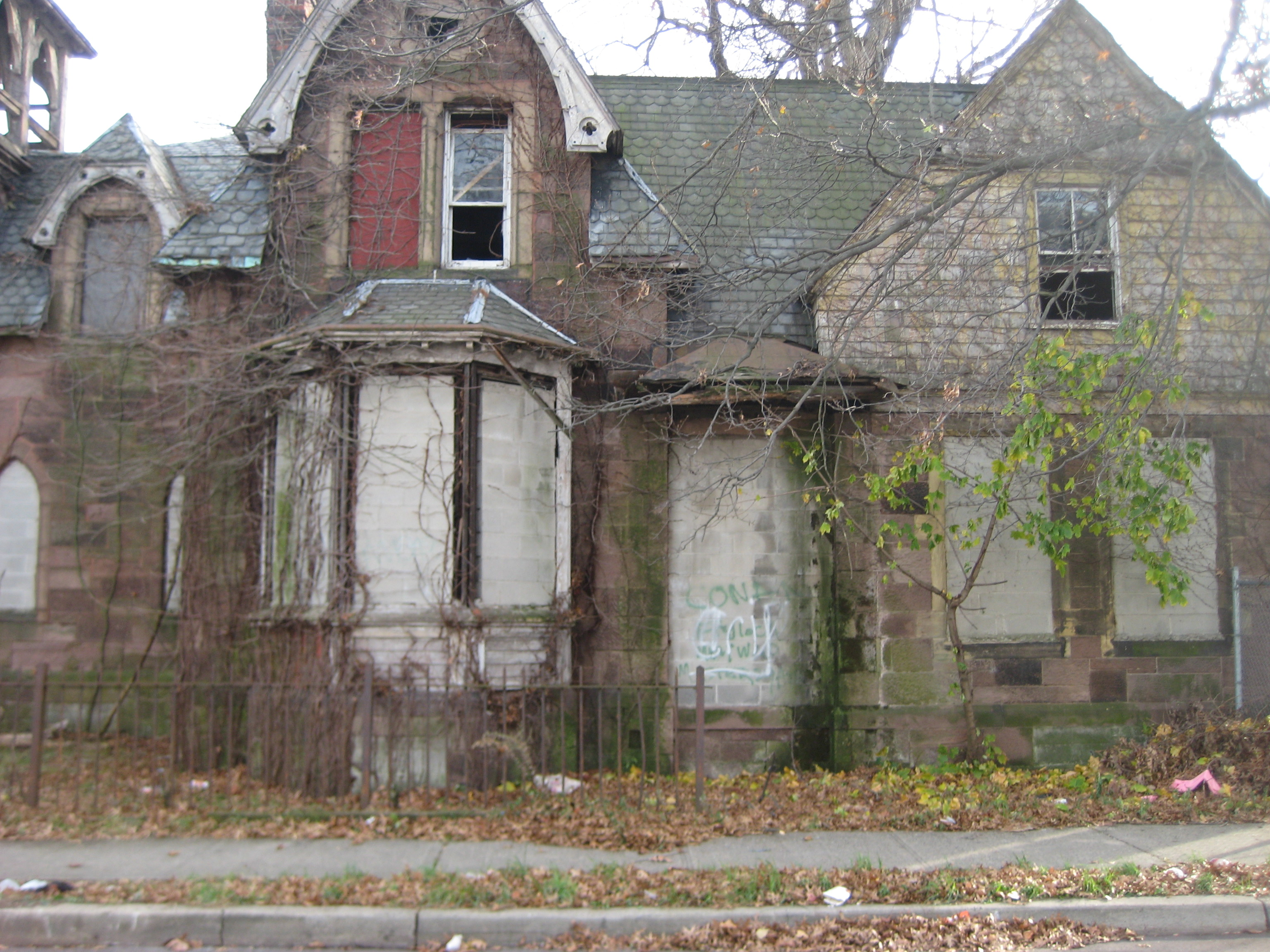
- Gate House, Woodland Cemetery
- Interactive map of Woodland Cemetery

Details
- Established: 1855
- Location: Newark, New Jersey
- Country: United States
- Coordinates: 40.7289°N 74.2022°W
- Type: Non-denominational
- Owned by: Woodland Cemetery Company
- Size: 36.5-acre (0.148 km^{2})
- No. of graves: 80,000+ burials
- Website: woodlandcemeterynnj.org
- Find a Grave: Woodland Cemetery

Woodland Cemetery (also known as West Newark Cemetery or the German Cemetery) is a 36.5-acre (0.148 km^{2}) nonsectarian burial ground located at 670 South 10th Street in the city of Newark, New Jersey. Established in 1855 and active until the 1980s, the cemetery served the city's German immigrant population and their descendants, and later served a large number of Greek immigrant and African-American graves. The cemetery has had significant vandalism and many efforts to clean it up. It reopened for new burials in 2016.

== Overview ==
The cemetery is owned by its lot owners. It has a board of managers who have family buried in the cemetery.

About 70,000 to 80,000 people have been buried there. The cemetery includes hundreds of veterans, including from the Civil War up to the Vietnam War. To help people find the graves of relatives, volunteers compiled a searchable database based on burial ledgers held by the New Jersey Historical Society.

== History ==
Woodland Cemetery is one of Newark's oldest cemeteries. Since the 1960s and the urban decline of Newark, many of the descendants of the German immigrants and families buried here moved away from the city. As early as the 1950s, and accelerating in the 1960s, Woodland Cemetery experienced vandalism and the toppling of several thousand gravestones.

In 1980, the cemetery closed to new burials, and after that its only income was interest on its trust fund, which was inadequate for maintenance.

In the mid-1990s, some people with family members buried in the cemetery organized a Friends and Family of Woodland Cemetery group to recruit and organize volunteers and donations for clean-up work, including resetting gravestones. Volunteers coordinated annual clean-up days between around 1999 and 2012, canceled in 2013 because the board could not cut the grass.

In 2008, local residents gathered to protest the large amount of trash and illegal activity in the cemetery, asking the cemetery board and the city to clean it up. Between 2001 and 2011, at least four people were killed in the cemetery or adjacent to it. Neighbors also complained about drug dealing and prostitution on the grounds.

In 2011, more than 80 volunteers spent two days picking up trash, cutting grass, and clearing branches, organized by the New Jersey Youth Corps and Greater Newark Conservancy. In 2013, the board of managers discussed plans for maintenance and finding additional funding, and they asked for help from volunteers. In 2016, a community group organized volunteers for cleanup projects, but the community group and board disagreed on approach.

Another person was found dead in the cemetery in 2018.

== Notable burials ==
- Ike Quebec (1918–1963), tenor saxophonist and jazz musician
