= West Side, Newark, New Jersey =

Populated place in Essex County, New Jersey, US

Coordinates: 40°44′03″N 74°12′12″W

The West Side is a neighborhood in the city of Newark in Essex County, in the U.S. state of New Jersey.

== Location ==
It is bounded on the east by Bergen Street, on the south by Rose Terrace and Avon Avenue, on the west by Irvington and on the north by South Orange Avenue. The main roads running through the neighborhood are Bergen Street, South Orange Avenue and Springfield Avenue. The mostly residential neighborhood is home to Woodland Cemetery and West Side Park. West Side High School and Chad Science Academy (closed down in 2005) (7-12) are also in this neighborhood.

== West Side Park ==
The area between 14th Street, 17th Avenue, 12th Avenue and Avon Avenue, once called Wolf's Harbor, is now the area around West Side Park. The area of Wolf's Harbor was once a large marsh that was home to several wolves. The area was renamed Magnolia Swamp after the tree when the wolves disappeared from the swamp. The swamp was filled in over time and eventually 14th Street cut through the middle of it after land was repeatedly filled in by Edward Keogh (an area that later was called Keogh's Hole). West Side Park, a county run park, was originally situated on a hill full of linden trees overlooking a lake, but the lake was later filled in to accommodate fields. Today the west side of the park remains elevated over the clear flat east side of the park and the hill was once used for skiing. There were once performances at the park, including Dionne Warwick and Whitney Houston.
