= Ivy Hill, Newark, New Jersey =

Neighborhood of Newark, New Jersey, US

Coordinates: 40°44′24″N 74°14′27″W

Ivy Hill is a neighborhood of Newark, Essex County, in the U.S. state of New Jersey. It is a diverse neighborhood in the city's West Ward bordering South Orange, Maplewood and Irvington. The Ivy Hill neighborhood is often considered a section of the Vailsburg area.

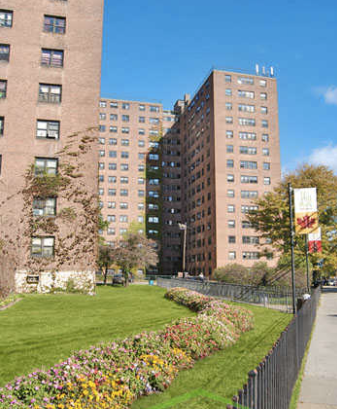
Ivy Hill Apartments

== History ==
The Ivy Hill area had been part of the South Orange Township known as Maplewood until 1890 when the city of Newark bought this land. In 1926, another 110 acres (0.45 km^{2}) was annexed by Newark. In the 1960s, novelist Philip Roth in his 1997 book American Pastoral, described the community as family-oriented and safe.

== Schools ==
Mount Vernon Elementary School and Ivy Hill Elementary School are located in Ivy Hill.

== Mount Sinai Congregation ==
Mount Sinai Congregation and Jewish Senior Center is located in Ivy Hill. Several hundred Russian Jews live in the area.

== Ivy Hill Park ==
In 1927, the City of Newark designated 18 acres (7 ha) of land to establish Ivy Hill Park in order to accommodate the recreational needs of Maplewood, Newark, South Orange, and Irvington.

Due to a 25-year, no-cost lease agreement between Seton Hall University and Essex County Parks for one acre of University tennis courts, this brings the total number of courts in the park to 10. In exchange, the County rehabilitated the tennis courts and allows Seton Hall University use of the park's facilities.

The area hosts softball competitions.

Ivy Hill Park also includes hard surface tennis courts, softball/baseball fields, a combination football/soccer field, a lighted basketball court, a playground, a shelter, and a band concert area.

== Politics ==
The Ivy Hill Neighborhood Association was formed several decades ago and hosts forums for public debate. In 2010, concerns voiced by members included issues such as "increased police presence, job creation, failing schools, recreational facilities for children, control of the Newark watershed, and residency requirements for city employees." Many city workers do not live within the city limits, according to one report.

== Residential ==
The area has many well kept single-family, duplex homes and apartment buildings of various sizes.

The Ivy Hill Park Apartments consists of ten fifteen-story buildings on Mount Vernon Place and Manor Drive. It is a privately managed facility which spreads out for half a mile. "Groundbreaking for the Ivy Hill Apartments took place in September 1951, with the first tenants moving in November of the next year. The developers were Arthur Pedula and Ralph Solow. Though forgotten today, Pedula was one of Newark's largest developers. The Ivy Hill Apartments were built with federal and city assistance. The City of Newark sold Pedula and Solow the 31 acres for the apartments, and the federal government, through the Federal Housing Administration, provided $17 million in low interest loans to the developers. Newark further facilitated the apartment buildings construction to allow for cheaper reinforced concrete, rather than structural steel. It is also a nuclear fallout shelter. In 1955, the complex was sold to New York real estate investor and manager Henry Moscowitz, owner of the Argo Corporation. The Ivy Hill apartments were originally solidly middle-class. Nearly a fifth of all residents were transplants from New York City and 22% of the residents commuted into the great metropolis. Throughout the years, it became home to an extremely diverse resident base. In 2011, residents from over 40 countries were represented, totaling up to 10,000 residents, with the sense of the complex being like a mini "United Nations". Of the 10,000 residents, 1,000 of them are Russian speakers. Due to its walking proximity to Seton Hall University, many undergraduate and graduate students live here too. There are also a number of retirees. The complex is New Jersey's largest privately owned apartment complex. There is a shopping center on nearby Irvington Ave.

== Notable residents ==
- Rah Digga, rap music artist
- Andre de Krayewski, artist
- Teri Shields, mother of actress and model Brooke Shields, who was born in the neighborhood
- Randy Foye, NBA Guard who grew up in the Ivy Hill Apartment Complex
- Ahmad Rahami, Chelsea bomber

== Public transportation ==
- The 1 or 361X connects Ivy Hill with Jersey City and Newark Penn Station. Number 1 buses run almost every half-hour starting at 4:34 am. 361X express buses run during the morning rush at 7:16, 7:23, 7:30, 7:37, 7:44, 7:51, 8:00, 8:14, 8:24, 8:40.
- Service on the 107 begins at 4:45 am on weekdays and the last bus to arrive from New York arrives at 2:49 am. It is the second stop, after the South Orange Train Station, on the number 107. bus to New York.
- The loop is the first stop on the number 37 bus to Newark Liberty International Airport, which begins at 4:04 am on weekdays. The last bus to arrive from Newark Airport arrives at 12:12 am.

== Crime ==
The area has been plagued by high rates of crime in the past few decades, with numerous muggings and murders. There was a murder of a 26-year-old man in 2008 and a woman in 2011.

In 2007 there was a triple execution-style murder of three college-bound students behind the Mount Vernon school which generated national attention. The murdered students became known as the Mount Vernon 3. They had been bound for Delaware State University. The shooting happened in a parking lot behind the Mount Vernon School just across Manor Drive from Ivy Hill Park Apartments. It led to lawsuits against the school for inadequate security as well as protests from residents about lack of police presence, an underused police facility, and lack of surveillance cameras.

The Ivy Hill Park Apartment complex has had serious problems with crime, although there are conflicting reports whether the crime rate is improving. Some court cases involving these apartments include Kuzmicz v. Ivy Hill Park Apartments, Ivy Hill Park Apts. V. GNB Park. Corp, Ivy Hill Park Apts. V Sidisin, etc.

There was a homicide victim in building 55. There is a report of residents who were "often afraid to approach their own apartments because of the gauntlet of gang members lurking around the doorways of the buildings." Some buildings were plagued by "garbage and mischief". Illegal immigrants have lived in the Ivy Hill Park Apts. According to longtime residents, the management has recently changed for the better, but it is a slow process. There are also unmarked police cars parked around the area.

According to one newspaper account:

Drug dealing nearby is hardly uncommon. Parties could get out of hand. Cars were stolen. Lights were broken. Fists could fly, and weapons could be brandished.

— report in The New York Times, 2007

The complex management had trouble dealing with gang members who used the extensive complex as a hideout. Security guards for the complex, including off-duty Newark police officers, gave "little resistance" to gang activity, according to one report. Evictions did not seem to matter since gang members returned to the complex to menace residents.

There were always problems in those apartments. I wanted to protect my sons.

— resident of Ivy Hill Apartments in 2007

The complex was described as "rough" with an "atmosphere of fear." Criminal gangs either lived or robbed there, sometimes who slipped through apartment doors "cracked barely open by frightened residents." One gang did stickups in elevators and parking lots to extort cash from victims.

In March 2018, the city opened the first police precinct in the neighborhood in 100 years, and the situation is improving. The area is much cleaner and tenants are not afraid to go out to the grocery store or anyplace else. Police patrols have been stepped up.
