= Vailsburg, Newark =

Populated place in Essex County, New Jersey, US

Coordinates: 40°44′26″N 74°13′08″W

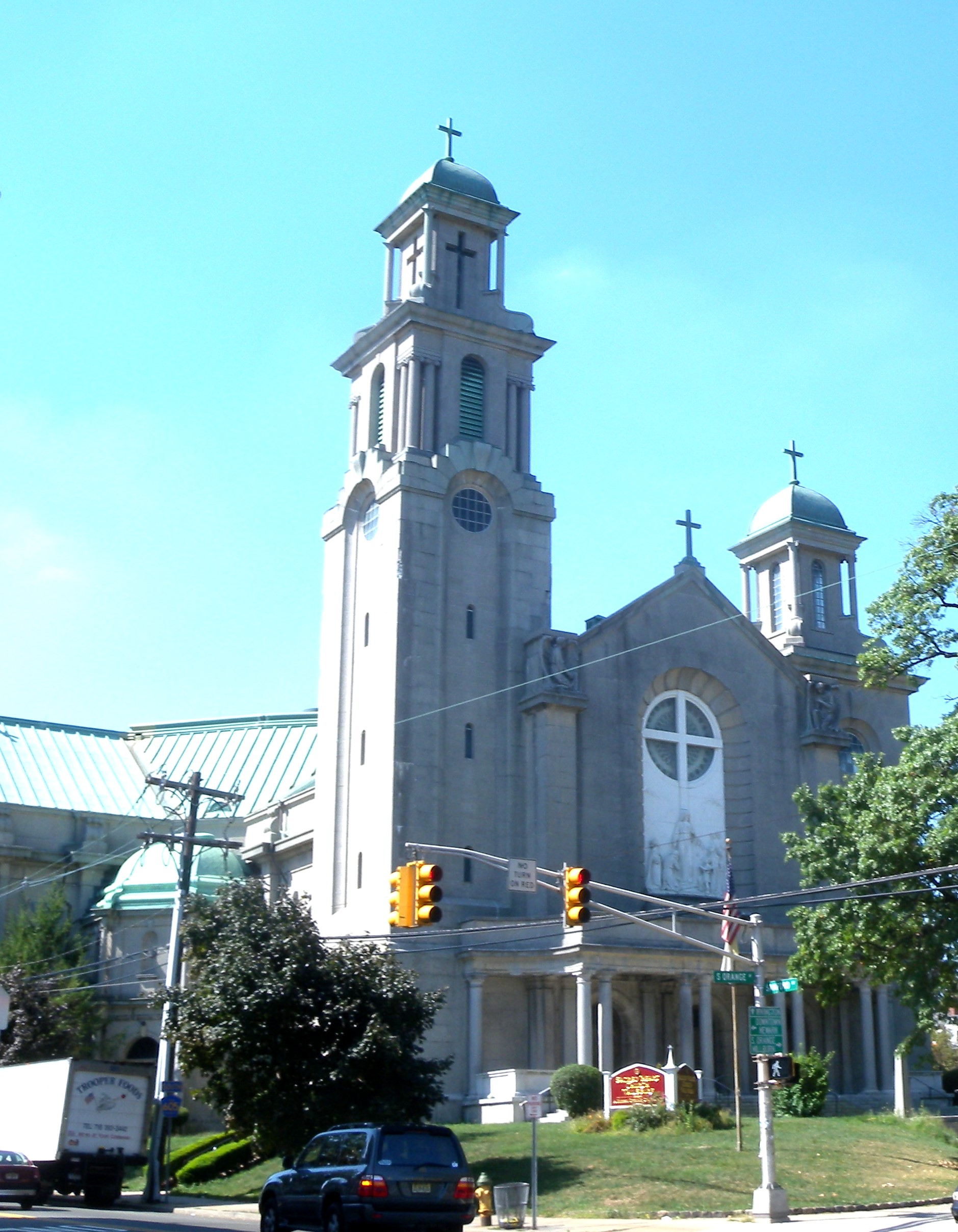
Sacred Heart Church on the border between Upper and Lower Vailsburg

Vailsburg is a neighborhood in the city of Newark in Essex County, in the U.S. state of New Jersey. Part of the West Ward, its elevation is 280 feet (85 m). As of 2000, Vailsburg had a population of 34,348. The Vailsburg section of Newark is on a hill which closely aligns with the suburban and park areas outside it. Vailsburg includes the two smaller neighborhoods of upper Vailsburg and lower Vailsburg, both of which have Sanford Avenue as a focal point. Upper Vailsburg is closer to Maplewood and South Orange.

== History ==
Vailsburg had existed as an independent municipality, and was incorporated as a borough by an act of the New Jersey Legislature on March 28, 1894, from portions of South Orange Township. Vailsburg was annexed by Newark on January 1, 1905, based on the results of a special election held on April 12, 1904. The borough was named for Dr. Merit H. Cash Vail, a physician and politician who was a major landowner and advocate for an independent municipality.

In the mid-1890s, Vailsburg had been proposed as one of the municipalities that would form a "Greater Orange", in an effort to avoid piecemeal annexation by an expanding Newark. Vailsburg was the last independent suburb to be annexed to Newark, in 1905, during a failed attempt by the mayor of Newark to absorb Kearny, East Orange, Belleville, and Harrison. The district today stands out from the rest of Newark like a peninsula and is separated from the rest of the city by the trench of the Garden State Parkway.

== Today ==
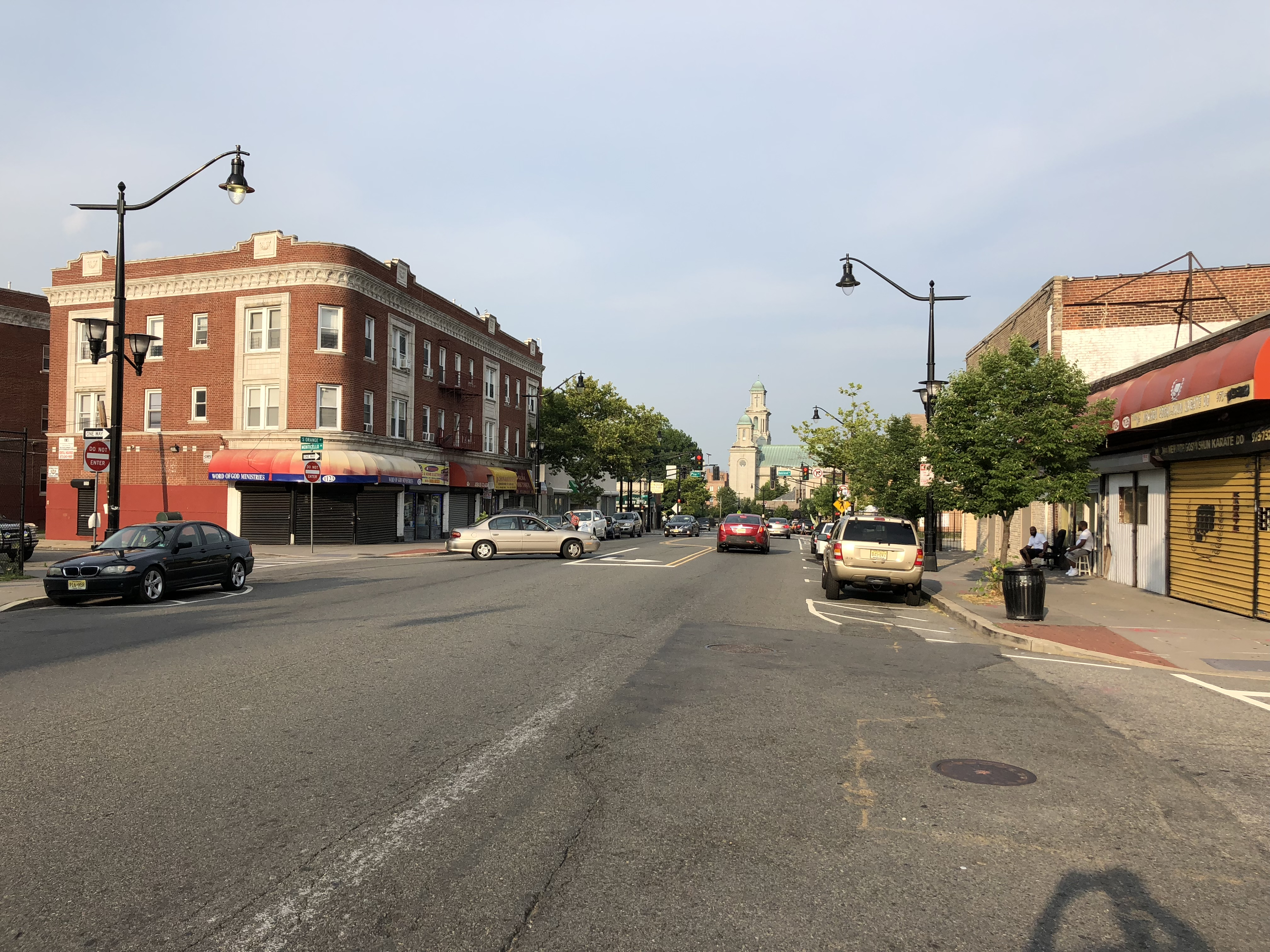
South Orange Avenue

Vailsburg has a significant stock of Dutch Colonial and Victorian inspired homes, mostly built between 1945 and 1947. Upper Vailsburg consists largely of single-family homes, while Lower Vailsburg consists of both single-family and two-family housing units. The area is also home to the Ivy Hill Apartments, New Jersey's largest rental complex. Vailsburg has some abandoned property and other signs of urban decay, but many parts feel suburban. There are many well maintained homes and streets. Its commercial streets, particularly South Orange Avenue, underwent street-scape improvements at the turn of the 21st century and many businesses renovated their storefronts. Many mom-and-pop businesses line the avenue, giving the sense that entrepreneurial activity is greater than most other neighborhoods of Newark. Residents are mainly middle class, and with more than 37 block associations, Vailsburg is known for its strong sense of community.

The primary service and advocacy organization in Vailsburg is Unified Vailsburg Services Organization (UVSO). Founded as an ecumenical coalition with a mission to stabilize the neighborhood in 1972, UVSO now serves an average of 1,200 Vailsburg residents every day through a wide range of programs. These include three preschool centers, four public school-based after school programs, a teen center, a senior center, transportation, meals on wheels, home makers and visiting nurses, community organizing, and housing development. UVSO opened a new child development center in 2015.

Recording artist Lauryn Hill mentions the neighborhood in one of her songs.

== Demographics ==
Vailsburg's population today consists largely of immigrants from West Africa and the West Indies. Haitian, Guyanese and Jamaican establishments particularly have a high profile in this section of Newark. Immigrants from Nigeria and Liberia are also a growing Vailsburg constituency. There is also a large Ukrainian presence in the neighborhood as well, as evidenced by the construction of St. John the Baptist Ukrainian Catholic Church between 1963 and 1965 and the associated parish school in 1953, many still reside in the Ivy Hill complex, although nowadays Ukrainians in New Jersey typically live in Morris County and other suburban areas.

== Education ==
=== Primary schools ===
==== Public schools ====
Newark Public Schools operates area schools. Five elementary and K-8 schools, schools serving Vailsburg include, Ivy Hill School, Lincoln School and Mount Vernon School.

=== Public libraries ===
Newark Public Library's Vailsburg Branch Library serves the Vailsburg neighborhood. The first library in Vailsburg opened in 1906 as a deposit station in the store of William Fisher on the southeast corner of South Orange Avenue and Sanford Avenue. Two hundred fifty to three hundred books were housed in a revolving case. The branch was closed in 1914 due to a lack of funds. Later, The Newark Public Library placed 3,000 books in the three schools in the area. The idea of a Vailsburg Branch Library was discussed several times in the following years, but it was not until November 1924 that the library board of trustees decided to place a branch in the Vailsburg area. In October 1927 the Vailsburg Branch Library opened at the present site of 75 Alexander Street. The building was a modified type of Georgian architecture with red brick and white trim. The newly renovated Vailsburg Branch was opened to the public on May 20, 2003.

== Parks ==
There are two parks located in the neighborhood which include the Vailsburg Park and Ivy Hill Park. Vailsburg Park is located on South Orange Avenue and Oraton Parkway, running alongside the Garden State Parkway. A mid-sized park heavily used primarily by neighborhood residents, it lies in the Vailsburg area of Newark and is the tenth largest park in the county park system. Ivy Hill Park is a neighborhood park on the westernmost border of Newark, between Seton Hall University and Mt. Vernon Place. Like Independence Park in the Ironbound, Ivy Hill Park is a small, unadorned park, yet one heavily used.

== Local landmarks ==
One major landmark of Vailsburg is Vailsburg Park. The land for Vailsburg Park was originally "Electric Park," an amusement park owned by the Krueger brewing family. The residents of Vailsburg believed that Electric Park harmed the peace of the neighborhood and lobbied to have the amusement park converted into a park for passive recreation. A velodrome across from the park was built at the turn of the 20th century and was taken down in the late 1920s.

Now closed, Sacred Heart Roman Catholic Church, on the west side of Sandford Avenue at the corner of South Orange Avenue, is the most prominent structure on the street and was the largest parish church in Newark. The parish itself was founded in 1892, prior to the Newark annexation in 1905 and the construction of the Sacred Heart Basilica, which explains the use of the same name as the great North Ward cathedral. The present church was built in the 1920s and was designed by Neil J. Convery, who also designed St. Lucy´s Church in the North Ward. The church celebrated its 115th anniversary on June 10, 2007, and closed on July 1, 2010, due to a decline in parishioners.

St. John the Baptist Ukrainian Catholic Church, located on Sandford Avenue, is one of Newark´s most interesting congregations and beautiful churches. The building is a combination of modern and Byzantine architecture. The stained glass and mosaics of St. John´s tell the story of Christianity in Eastern Europe.

Newark Gospel Tabernacle, is a South Orange Avenue landmark and official historic building. It was formerly the Stanley Theater, and is the best-preserved 1920s-era movie palace in Newark. The façade that´s visible from South Orange Avenue is misleading; the structure is much larger on the inside. A side view of the structure better illustrates how far back the theater actually extends. The building was designed by architect Frank Grad, the principal of one of Newark´s two most prominent architectural firms. The interior of the church/theater is reminiscent to a Mediterranean-style courtyard, with the main auditorium designed to look like the square of a Spanish village. The large auditorium sat 1,200 people when first built.

== Notable people ==
- Raymond M. Durkin (1936–2014), politician who served as chairman of the New Jersey Democratic State Committee.
- Dan Gutman (born 1955), writer, primarily of children's fiction.
- Mach-Hommy
