= Mount Pleasant, Newark, New Jersey =

Neighborhood in Essex County, New Jersey, US

Coordinates: 40°45′29″N 74°10′10″W

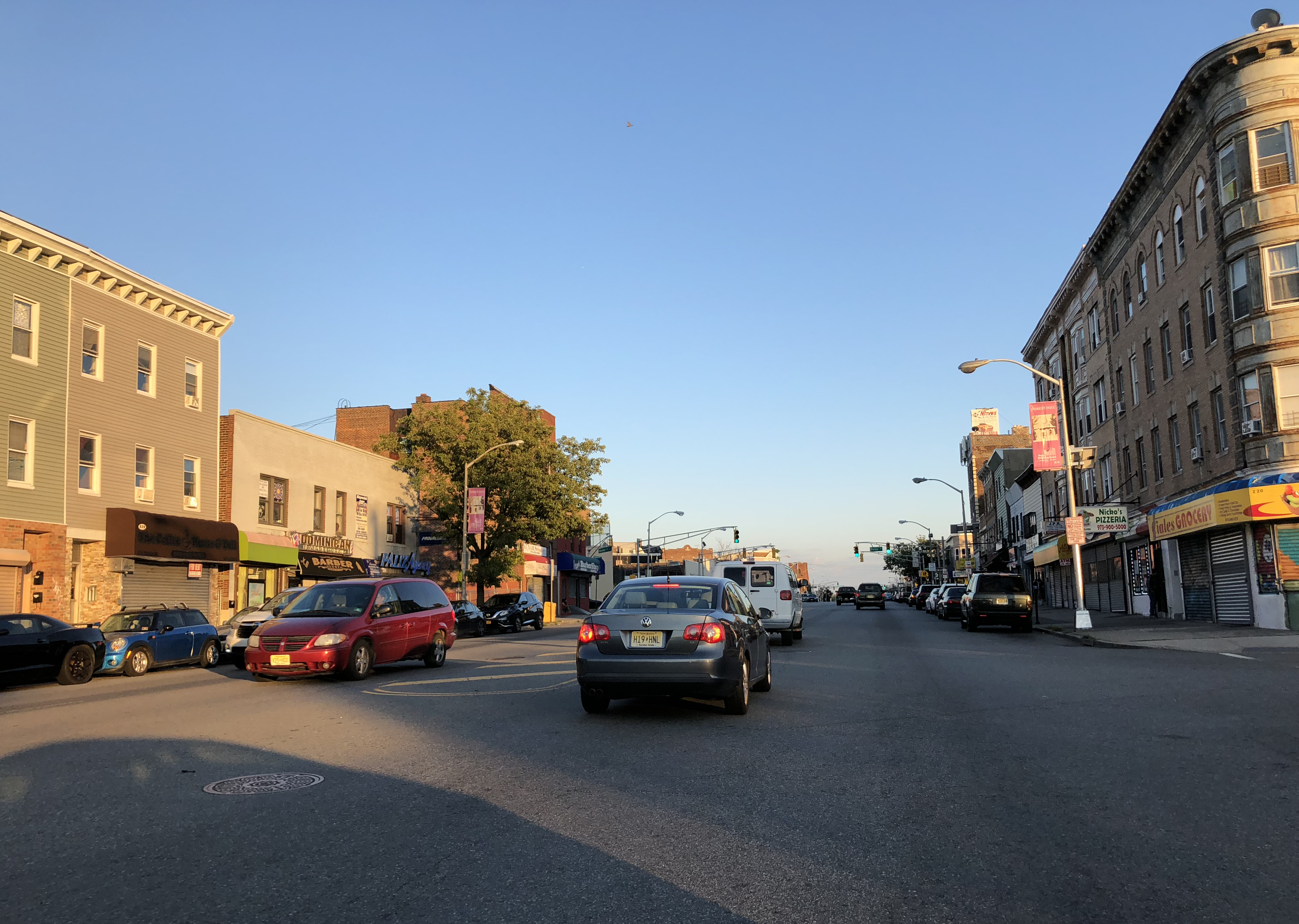
Bloomfield at Highland

Mount Pleasant is a neighborhood in Newark in Essex County, in the U.S. state of New Jersey. It is east of Branch Brook Park and north of the Lower Broadway neighborhood. It is named for the hill overlooking the Passaic River on which it rests.

A number of landmarks in the neighborhood include the former Newark Teachers College, located on the corner of Broadway and 4th Avenue, and is today Technology High School. It also served as the temporary home of Arts High School in the mid-1990s. The open and raised Erie Lackawanna (Norfolk Southern) railroad's NX Bridge, which appeared in the film Annie overlooks over the neighborhood. Erie Lackawanna discontinued passenger service on the Newark Branch in '66, there was a small station at 4th Avenue near Passaic Street as was a small freight yard and tower. Today the branch is freight only and operated by Norfolk Southern Railroad.

The neighborhood is home to the Mount Pleasant Cemetery, a historic cemetery listed on the national register of historic places. The cemetery dates back to the 1800s. Another historic feature of the neighborhood is the original headquarters of the Mutual Benefit Life Insurance Company, built in 1927.

== See also ==
- Broadway, Newark, New Jersey
- Mount Pleasant Cemetery, Newark
