= Springfield/Belmont, Newark, New Jersey =

Populated place in Essex County, New Jersey, US

Coordinates: 40°44′35″N 74°11′04″W

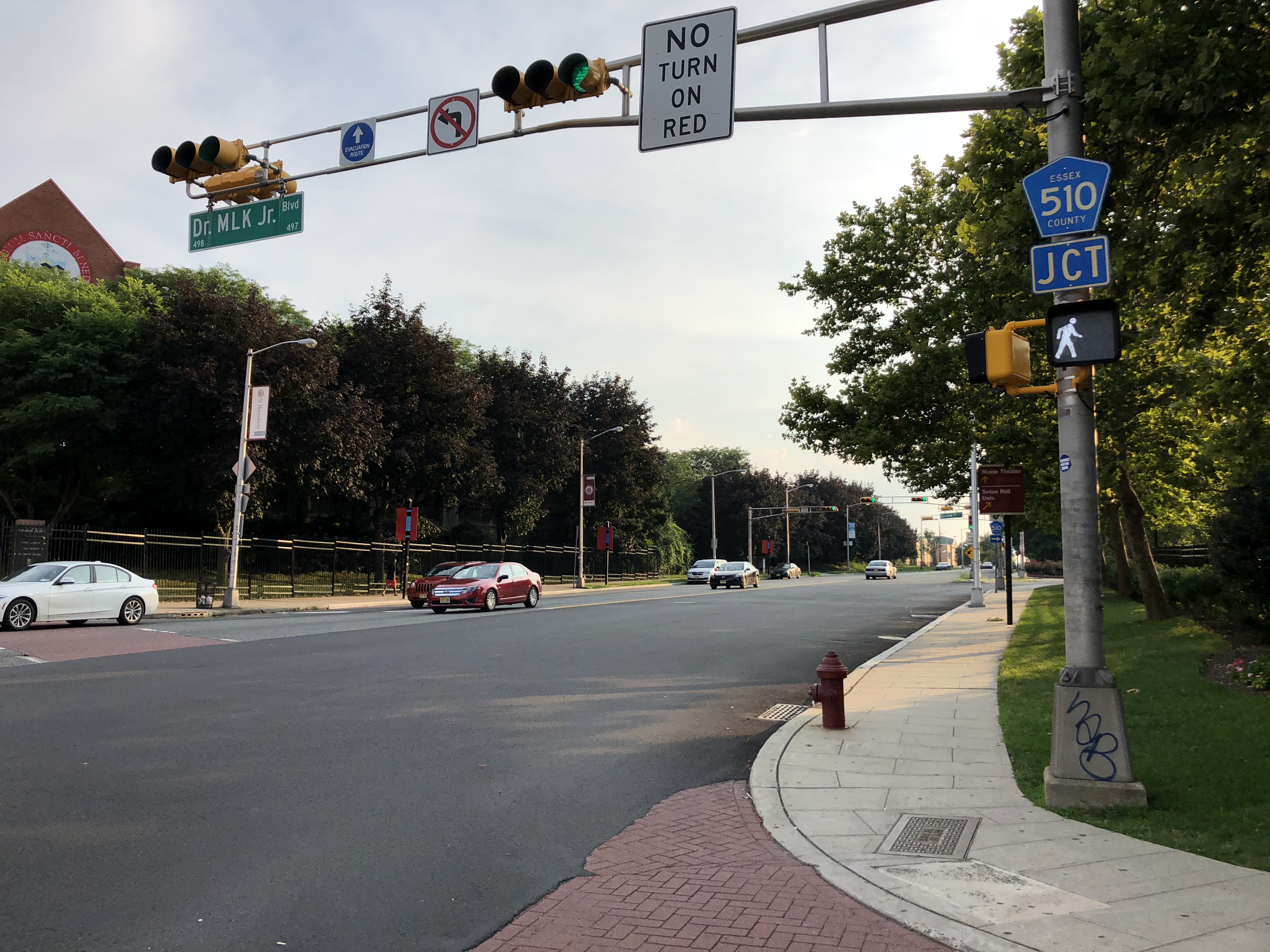
Namesake Springfield Avenue

Springfield/Belmont is a neighborhood in the city of Newark in Essex County, in the U.S. state of New Jersey. Part of the Central Ward, it is unofficially bounded by South Orange Avenue in the north, Avon Avenue in the south, Martin Luther King Boulevard and University Avenue on the east, and Bergen Street in the west. The neighborhood derives its name from the intersection of Springfield Avenue and Irvine Turner Boulevard, formerly known as Belmont Avenue.

At one point, this was the "shtetl" of Eastern European Jews. The Jews of Newark were distinct from the Jews of New York City in that most worked as peddlers, grocers, tailors, mechanics, technicians, artisans, jewelers, and repairmen, as opposed to factory workers. Gradually, the Jews of Newark grew in affluence, and many moved south to Weequahic and Hillside, though lower middle-class Jews were to be found in the neighborhood as late as the 1950s. From the 1940s on, many African Americans from Virginia and the Carolinas moved here during the Great Migration (African-American), attracted by the World War II boom for such local corporations as Westinghouse. By the 1967 Newark civil unrest, this was a slum, with a high concentration of housing projects in the section east of Bergen Street.

Springfield/Belmont's projects were demolished in the 1990s and replaced by small scale public and private housing. Springfield/Belmont is close to 100% African American, and one of Newark's neighborhoods most drastically affected by white flight.

Springfield/Belmont contains many historic buildings along Martin Luther King Boulevard, formerly known as High Street. Describing the street from north to south, a visitor would see the Art-Deco extravagance of Arts High School, classically inspired St. Agnes Greek church, the magnificent Victorian architecture of the Krueger-Scott Mansion, the Beaux-Arts Feigenspan Mansion, a Neo-Classical former synagogue, and finally the Moorish Revival Prince Street Synagogue. Built for a German brewer, the Krueger-Scott mansion was the most expensive home ever built in Newark. Plans are afoot to turn it into an American cultural center.

The 1884 Prince Street Synagogue, former home of Congregation Oheb Shalom, later Metropolitan Baptist Church, at 32 Prince Street, has been restored and converted to a nature center for Newark by the Greater Newark Conservancy. The yard of the old synagogue has been turned into a beautiful community garden. It also features a pond with fish, frogs, turtles, and salamanders in it.

The most severe destruction from the Newark civil unrest occurred on Bergen Street between Clinton Avenue and Springfield Avenue. Since the millennium, new construction of Society Hill and the Springfield Marketplace have replaced many abandoned lots. A Food desert is a neighborhood where there is a shortage of places to buy food. Despite the closure of a new supermarket one year after its opening, several have opened or are planned to open in the city.

The Springfield branch of the Newark Public Library is located in the Springfield/Belmont neighborhood. The Springfield Avenue Marketplace is a $94 million mixed-use development that opened in 2016 and features a variety of stores. There are other new retail establishments on lower Springfield Ave.

Saint Benedict's Preparatory School and the Metropolitan Baptist Church are also located in the neighborhood.
