= Lionsgate Studios =

Canadian-American film and television production conglomerate

Lionsgate Studios Corp.

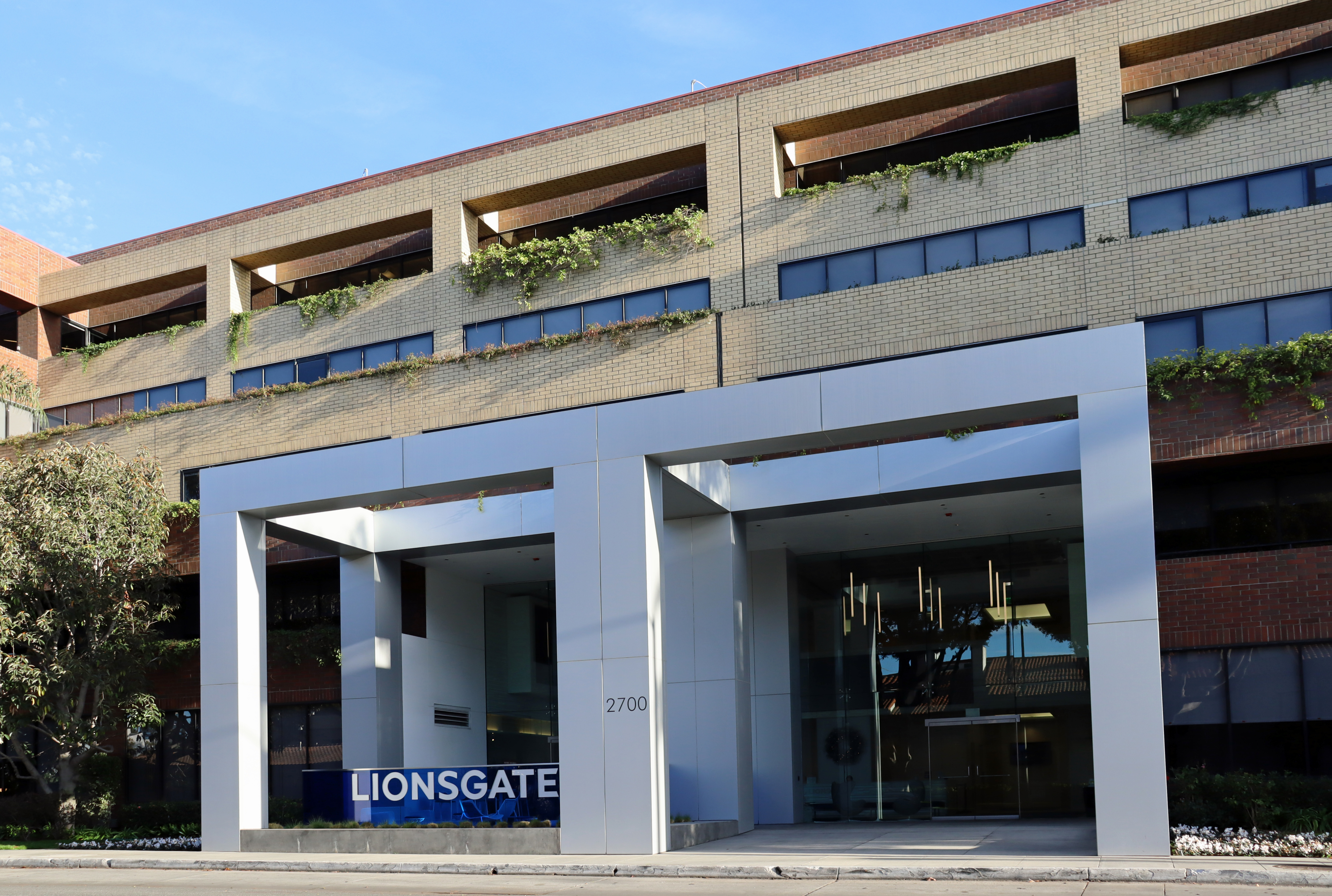
- Lionsgate Studios headquarters in Santa Monica
- Trade name: Lionsgate Studios
- Type: Public
- Traded as: NYSE: LION
- Industry: Entertainment
- Predecessors: Starz Entertainment (film and television businesses); Screaming Eagle Corporation
- Founded: May 14, 2024; 2 years ago
- Headquarters: 2700 Colorado Avenue, Santa Monica, California, U.S.
- Area served: Worldwide
- Key people: Mark Rachesky (chairman); Michael Burns (vice chairman); Jon Feltheimer (CEO)
- Brands: Saw; Blair Witch; Step Up; The Twilight Saga; The Hunger Games; The Expendables; John Wick; Now You See Me; Dirty Dancing
- Revenue: ▲US$3.2 billion (2025)
- Operating income: ▼US$125 million (2025)
- Net income: ▼US$−362 million (2025)
- Total assets: ▼US$6.8 billion (2025)
- Total equity: ▼US$2.7 billion (2025)
- Divisions: Lionsgate Films; Lionsgate Television; Lionsgate Alternative Television; Lionsgate Home Entertainment
- Subsidiaries: Lionsgate Canada; Lionsgate India (10%); Lionsgate/SP Media (50%); Summit Entertainment; Pilgrim Media Group; 3 Arts Entertainment; Render Road (owned by both Lionsgate and 3 Arts); Amblin Partners (30%); 42 (minority stake)
- Website: lionsgate.com

Lionsgate Studios Corp. is a Canadian-American film and television production and distribution conglomerate, domiciled in Vancouver, British Columbia, and primarily based in Santa Monica, California. It was formed on May 14, 2024, after Starz Entertainment, formerly known as "Lionsgate", spun off its film and television businesses and merged them with Screaming Eagle Corporation.

Lionsgate Studios' portfolio includes Lionsgate Canada (formerly known as Entertainment One/eOne), 3 Arts Entertainment, Pilgrim Media Group, Lionsgate Films, Lionsgate Television, Lionsgate Alternative Television, Lionsgate Home Entertainment, a minority stake in 42, and a stake of joint venture Amblin Partners.

== Background ==
Following the completion of acquisition of Entertainment One from toy company Hasbro on December 27, 2023, Lionsgate revealed its intention to split its film and television assets into its own company, whose Studios division would merge with a special-purpose acquisition company named Screaming Eagle Corporation to form a separate publicly traded company called Lionsgate Studios Corporation. The deal was closed on May 7, 2024, with the transaction setting a $4.6-billion value on Lionsgate Studios.

The company launched a week later on May 14, and began trading on Nasdaq via the stock symbol LION. Lionsgate remained its controlling shareholder, owning around 87% of it following the split. In January 2025, the studio announced its full separation from Starz, which had been severed the previous year.

In July 2025, Legendary Entertainment was reported to be overseeing a deal to acquire Lionsgate Studios, it never happened until October 20, 2026, when Bloomberg report that Legendary's deal to acquire Lionsgate Studios would cost $3.5 billion. The deal would give Legendary Pictures a theatrical distribution arm, as well as Lionsgate’s extensive and cash-generating library. Bloomberg Intelligence analyst Geetha Ranganathan wrote in an Oct. 22 note, adding that Legendary's bid may be the start of the process of Legendary Entertainment buying Lionsgate Studios. "I think it could make sense given the deep catalog," she said in an email, when asked about Lionsgate's potential debt offering. "Library-backed bonds could lower funding costs, but the flip side is lower flexibility to use those assets or the catalog in the potential M&A transaction."

On August 1, 2025, Lionsgate launched a new over-the-air television version of MovieSphere called "MovieSphere Gold".

On December 24, 2025, TheWrap mentioned Lionsgate Studios (as well as NBCUniversal) as part of the merge with Paramount Skydance, if their bid to acquire Warner Bros. Discovery ends up failing. This did not happen, however, as Lionsgate Studios (along with the former namesake Starz Entertainment, which also offered to buy WBD) dropped out of the bid, once Paramount Skydance went ahead with their definitive agreement to buy the entirety of WBD on February 27, 2026.

On July 15, 2026, Banijay set up a bidding war to buy Lionsgate Studios along with Mediawan. Bolloré was thought to have bid for the company, but confirmed that it wasn't bidding as per earlier reports. On July 29, 2026, when Banijay dropped out of the bidding war leaving Mediawan to focus on acquiring Lionsgate Studios.

On September 8, 2026, it was reported that the company would enter into a strategic partnership with Toei Animation to release its films in the US, beginning with Monkey Quest in 2027. Lionsgate will also get first-look for new co-productions under the deal.

On October 26, 2026, Lionsgate and SP Media, headed by veteran film producer and financier Steven Paul, have formed a joint venture aimed at expanding Lionsgate’s entertainment businesses and providing a new source of independently produced feature films. The agreement ordered SP Media to make a significant capital investment to help finance new ventures that will broaden Lionsgate’s content platform. The investment also will support the continued diversification of 3 Arts Entertainment, Lionsgate’s talent management and production company, and other studio businesses. Under the agreement, SP Media will produce independent feature films for distribution by Lionsgate. The joint venture will be majority owned and controlled by Lionsgate. Financial terms were not disclosed. The partnership provides Lionsgate with additional capital to pursue growth opportunities while expanding its film distribution pipeline. For SP Media, the arrangement provides access to Lionsgate’s established theatrical, digital and home entertainment distribution infrastructure.

On October 28, 2026, Lionsgate would in investor talks about selling the bonds for the company's library to Mitsubishi UFJ Financial Group Inc.

On November 5, 2026, Lionsgate Studios posted fiscal second quarter revenue of $667 million, up 41%, beating Wall Street forecasts. On that same day, Lionsgate and 3 Arts launched Render Road, with Luke Maxwell and Will Rowbotham becoming CEOs of the banner.

== Films ==
Lionsgate Studios operates a film division known as Lionsgate Films, which consists of its own in-house productions, as well as films under the Summit Entertainment label, and from its Lionsgate Canada subsidiary. The latter company, which was known as Entertainment One prior to its sale to Lionsgate, also houses the libraries of now-defunct production companies such as Koch Entertainment, Christal Films, Alliance Atlantis (from the merger of its former existence as Alliance Communications and Atlantis Communications), Salter Street Films, Cineplex Odeon Films and Phase 4 Films.

Lionsgate Studios' library features titles from various now-defunct studios, including: Trimark Pictures (acquired in 2000), Artisan Entertainment (acquired in 2003 and with it Vestron Pictures which Artisan acquired in 1991), Starz Distribution (acquired by Lionsgate in 2016, which includes the libraries of Anchor Bay Entertainment, Overture Films, the pre-2015 Film Roman library and in-house content by Starz and its predecessor IDT Entertainment), the library of Hearst's entertainment division, Tribune Entertainment (through Debmar-Mercury), American Zoetrope (distribution deal in 2010, with certain exceptions), Modern Entertainment (library acquired in 2005), the assets of The Weinstein Company and Dimension Films (post-2005 titles only; through its 18.9% stake in Spyglass Media Group).

Lionsgate Studios' complete ownership depends on various and/or specific global licensing.

== Home entertainment ==
Lionsgate Home Entertainment
- Formerly: C/FP Video (1989–1994); CFP Video (1994–1998); Lions Gate Films Home Entertainment (1998–2000); Lions Gate Home Entertainment (2000–2006)
- Type: Division
- Industry: Home video
- Predecessors: Vidmark Entertainment; Trimark Home Video; Family Home Entertainment; Artisan Entertainment; Media Home Entertainment; Anchor Bay Entertainment; Starz Distribution; Contender Home Entertainment; Medusa Communications & Marketing
- Founded: October 21, 1989; 37 years ago
- Headquarters: 2700 Colorado Avenue, Santa Monica, California, U.S.
- Area served: Worldwide
- Products: DVD; Blu-ray; Ultra HD Blu-ray
- Services: Film distribution
- Parent: Lionsgate Studios
- Divisions: Entertainment One; Lionsgate Family Entertainment; Vestron Video
- Website: lionsgate.com

Lionsgate's films have been released on DVD, Blu-ray and Ultra HD Blu-ray, as well as on the PSP through Universal Media Disc.

Sony Pictures Home Entertainment (which in turn has been exclusively distributed by Studio Distribution Services since 2024) has been the company's exclusive distribution agent since 2021.

=== Early history ===
Audiovisual releases from Lions Gate were originally distributed on home video in the United States by Universal Studios Home Video (now Universal Pictures Home Entertainment) and Columbia TriStar Home Video (now Sony Pictures Home Entertainment). Lions Gate Films would eventually create two home video labels: Avalanche Home Entertainment, which released smaller Canadian B-movies on video and DVD; and Sterling Home Entertainment (a joint venture with Scanbox International, a European/Nordic company), which released American low-budget movies on video and DVD in the late 1990s. In June 2000, Lions Gate bought Trimark Pictures and merged its in-house home video unit with those of Avalanche and Sterling to form Lions Gate Home Entertainment the following year, i.e. in 2001.

After the acquisition, Sterling Home Entertainment was then renamed Studio Home Entertainment, which later folded into Lionsgate. Lions Gate bought Artisan Entertainment in 2003 and folded it into its Family Entertainment section of its Home Entertainment division the following year.

With a library of more than 8,000 films and although founded to distribute in-house productions, LGHE also previously distributed productions featuring Barbie from Mattel and Clifford the Big Red Dog from Scholastic Corporation, Stickin' Around videos from Nelvana and MGA Entertainment productions. Lionsgate Home Entertainment also previously distributed videos from the home entertainment division of The Jim Henson Company until 2012 when Henson signed a deal with Gaiam Vivendi Entertainment. With the acquisition of Artisan, LGHE also released the back catalog of ITC Entertainment until 2013, when ITC's successor-in-interest ITV Studios Global Entertainment signed a deal with Shout! Factory (now Shout! Studios).

Around 2001 in Québec, it was renamed Christal Films, and in Ontario along other provinces, dubbed Maple Pictures.

=== Further deals ===
In August 2001, Lions Gate Home Entertainment signed a deal with DIC Entertainment (now part of WildBrain) to distribute their back catalogue of animated titles on video and DVD in the United States, replacing DIC's long-time partner Buena Vista Home Entertainment. The partnership only lasted a year, as in 2003, DIC began distributing their shows through the Sterling Entertainment Group (unrelated to the ex-Lionsgate subsidiary Sterling Home Entertainment) and later other distribution companies such as Shout! Factory (now Shout! Studios), 20th Century Fox Home Entertainment (now 20th Century Home Entertainment) and NCircle Entertainment.

In 2008, Lionsgate Home Entertainment contracted with London-based HIT Entertainment for DVD distribution in the United States after its contract with 20th Century Fox Home Entertainment expired, which ended in 2014 and got transferred to Universal Pictures Home Entertainment.

On August 4, 2008, Lionsgate secured a deal with Disney-ABC Domestic Television for home video distribution rights to several Touchstone Television/ABC Studios (later known as ABC Signature) shows including According to Jim, Reaper, Hope & Faith, 8 Simple Rules and Boy Meets World.

In 2009, American Greetings struck a deal with Lionsgate to release its audiovisual content on DVD after its deal with 20th Century Fox Home Entertainment ended, with the exception of Strawberry Shortcake, as it was a prior deal made in 2003 between 20th Century Fox and American Greetings.

Until 2012, Lionsgate also distributed most of the theatrical properties held by Republic Pictures on DVD under license from Paramount Pictures. The deal also expanded to include some non-marquee films originally released by Paramount themselves. Recently, with the folding of Republic, Lionsgate's function was transferred to Olive Films (and later Kino Lorber).

On February 11, 2011, Lionsgate and France-based StudioCanal made an agreement to release 550 films from Miramax globally, replacing longtime partner Walt Disney Studios Home Entertainment at the time when Miramax was owned by the Walt Disney Company. It was transferred to Paramount Home Entertainment in April 2020 after the acquisition of a 49% stake in Miramax by PHE's parent company ViacomCBS (later known as Skydance Corporation).

In November 2015, Discovery Communications and Liberty Global each took a 3.4% stake in Lionsgate Entertainment, and as a result, LGHE began distributing titles from the Discovery library on home media starting in 2016 and ending in 2022 when Warner Bros. Home Entertainment took over distribution of Discovery home media releases following the merger of WarnerMedia with Discovery to form Warner Bros. Discovery.

On December 8, 2016, Lionsgate acquired Starz Inc., which includes the North American branches of Manga Entertainment and the first incarnation of Anchor Bay Entertainment. Shortly after acquisition, Anchor Bay was folded into Lionsgate Home Entertainment. Anchor Bay Entertainment would be revived by co-founders of Umbrelic Entertainment, Thomas Zambeck and Brian Katz, on February 15, 2024, as a production company for "genre films, undiscovered treasures, cult classics and remastered catalog releases".

On February 26, 2021, Lionsgate entered into a multi-year home entertainment distribution deal with Sony Pictures Home Entertainment, after Lionsgate's deal with 20th Century Studios Home Entertainment ended. Sony began distributing Lionsgate titles in July of the same year with Lionsgate continuing to maintain its own independent sales and marketing teams, while leveraging Sony's supply chain and distribution services for sales.

After Lionsgate completed its acquisition of Toronto-based Entertainment One (eOne), on December 27, 2023, its home entertainment division began distributing its physical releases worldwide. Media Capital Technologies was Lionsgate's main film co-financing partner from 2023 to 2025.

== Television ==
Lionsgate Television is the television arm of Lionsgate and Lionsgate Studios established in July 1997 and has produced such series as Nashville, Anger Management, The Dead Zone, 5ive Days to Midnight, Weeds, Nurse Jackie, Boss and Mad Men.

Lionsgate later acquired television syndication firm Debmar-Mercury on July 12, 2006 with CBS Media Ventures, at the time known as CBS Television Distribution, handling ad-sales (with the exception of Tyler Perry's Meet the Browns, for which the ad-sales were handled by Disney–ABC Domestic Television).

In March 2013, Lionsgate signed with Mars One, a Dutch non-profit with space agency and aerospace backers intent on colonizing Mars, to produce a reality television show.

On August 6, 2018, Lionsgate signed a first-look television development agreement with Universal Music Group.

With the acquisition of Entertainment One on December 27, 2023, Lionsgate restructured eOne's television assets and folded them into Lionsgate Television, creating in the process Lionsgate Alternative Television on January 14, 2024, which produces and distributes Lionsgate's unscripted television series.

== Studio complexes ==
=== Lionsgate Studios Yonkers ===
On September 5, 2019, Great Point Capital Management signed a deal with Lionsgate to build a new production facility in Yonkers, New York, with Lionsgate becoming a long-term anchor tenant and investor. As the anchor tenant, Lionsgate will have naming rights to the studio. Construction on the site will start in November, and the facility will be running in late Fall 2020. The $100 million complex will include three 20,000-square-feet and two 10,000-square-feet stages, a fully operational backlot and the opportunity to create a location-based entertainment property.

The studio, will be built next to the former Otis Elevator Company building in Getty Square and is expected to provide 420 new jobs in Yonkers, the developers said. They received numerous tax breaks and exemptions to build the project. National Resources will be an investment partner and project developer, responsible for all phases of design and construction of the studio complex.

On April 8, 2020, it was announced that the developers locked down $60 million in financing while the rest of the $40 million in the second phase of the project will be anchored by entertainment firm Lionsgate.

=== Lionsgate Newark studio ===
In 2022, the city of Newark, New Jersey announced that a major new film and television production studio overlooking Weequahic Park and Weequahic Golf Course, Lionsgate Newark Studios would open in 2024 on the 15-acre former Seth Boyden housing projects site at 101 Center Terrace in the Dayton section of the city near Evergreen Cemetery. Lionsgate Newark will partner on public relations and community affairs with the New Jersey Performing Arts Center.

== Under Liberty Strategic Capital ownership ==
On September 5, 2023, Liberty Strategic Capital, a private equity fund led by Steven Mnuchin, acquired a 5.5% stake in Lions Gate Entertainment (now Lionsgate Studios). This investment, totaling about $30.8 million, represented a significant investment for the company as it was preparing for the $500 million eOne acquisition and a planned split of its studio and streaming businesses. On May 30, 2025, Liberty Strategic Capital increased the stake to 12.6%.

== See also ==
- Lists of Lionsgate films
