= American Pastoral (film) =

2016 film by Ewan McGregor

- Theatrical release poster
- Directed by: Ewan McGregor
- Screenplay by: John Romano
- Based on: American Pastoral by Philip Roth
- Produced by: Tom Rosenberg; Gary Lucchesi; Andre Lamal
- Starring: Ewan McGregor; Jennifer Connelly; Dakota Fanning; Peter Riegert; Rupert Evans; Uzo Aduba; Molly Parker; David Strathairn
- Cinematography: Martin Ruhe
- Edited by: Melissa Kent
- Music by: Alexandre Desplat
- Production companies: Lakeshore Entertainment; Lionsgate
- Distributed by: Lionsgate
- Release dates: September 9, 2016 (TIFF); October 21, 2016 (United States)
- Running time: 108 minutes
- Country: United States
- Language: English
- Budget: $10 million
- Box office: $1.7 million

American Pastoral is a 2016 American crime-drama film directed by Ewan McGregor (in his feature directorial debut) and written by John Romano, based on the 1997 novel by Philip Roth. The film stars McGregor, Jennifer Connelly, Dakota Fanning, Peter Riegert, Rupert Evans, Uzo Aduba, Molly Parker and David Strathairn. Principal photography began on September 21, 2015, in Pittsburgh.

The film had its world premiere on September 9, 2016, at the 2016 Toronto International Film Festival and was theatrically released in the United States on October 21, 2016, by Lionsgate.

== Plot ==
In 1996, at the 45th-year reunion of the class of '51 at Weequahic High School in Newark, New Jersey, writer Nathan Zuckerman meets one of his old friends, Jerry Levov. They talk about Jerry's older brother, former all-state star athlete Seymour "Swede" Levov, class of '44, who had recently died after a long illness.

The story moves back to a young Swede persuading his father, glovemaking magnate Lou Levov, to let him marry his high school sweetheart, New Jersey's 1947 Miss America contestant Dawn Dwyer. Lou is skeptical because Swede is Jewish and Dawn is a devout Roman Catholic, but her strength and honesty sway him. They have a daughter, Meredith ("Merry"), and settle in the town of Old Rimrock, where they acquire a farm, with Swede commuting the 30 miles to the Newark glove factory.

Smart and quirky Merry struggles with a stuttering problem, and is deeply affected as a 12-year-old by the self-immolation of Thích Quảng Đức in 1963. By the time Merry reaches high school, she has become increasingly radicalized towards anarchism, as the Vietnam War rages, and frequently goes to New York City to take part in antiwar protests. When Merry lashes out during the 1967 Newark riots, Swede urges her to channel her energy into protesting against the war from closer to home. A few days later, the town's little post office and store is destroyed by a bomb, killing the owner.

Merry disappears, and is the FBI's prime suspect, though Swede and Dawn believe she is innocent or, if involved, being forced to act by older radicals she met in New York. Swede and Dawn visit Penny Hamlin, the wife of the store owner who was killed, to apologize. After Swede unsuccessfully hounds the FBI for information on Merry's whereabouts, 22-year-old Wharton Business School student Rita Cohen visits the factory, ostensibly working on a report for business class. Rita tips off Swede with credible information about Merry, hints that she knows Merry's whereabouts, then asks him to meet her at a hotel with $10,000 cash.

Swede meets Rita in the hotel room, but spurns her mean-spirited attempts to seduce him. Rita runs off with the money and leaves no further information regarding Merry. The strain of Merry's disappearance eventually causes Dawn to have a nervous breakdown. After treatment, Dawn seeks a facelift and starts an affair with a neighbor. She tells Swede that Merry has destroyed their former life, and tries to get Swede to forget about Merry so that they can start a new life.

In 1970, Swede spots Rita on a New York City street. Rita takes him to a skid-row area of Newark where Merry now lives. During two brief visits, Merry confesses to Swede that she made and planted a total of three bombs, killing four people. She tells of how she later slid into the underground, where she was robbed and raped. She has withdrawn from society, and is practicing extreme asceticism within the Indian Jain religion, which Swede attributes to her penance. In the quiet of her unkempt and simple life style her stutter has ceased. She has no desire to return home, and says that if he loves her, he will let her be. The years pass as Swede returns occasionally to stand outside the abandoned house where he last found Merry without ever seeing her again.

In the present, at Swede's funeral, Nathan muses that we know we are alive when we realize that "all the time... we are wrong" about our assumptions "about everyone". As the mourners are leaving, a cleaned up middle-aged Merry arrives, silently passing her uncle and mother as she walks to Swede's grave.

== Cast ==
- Ewan McGregor as Seymour "Swede" Levov, a former high school star athlete and a successful Jewish American businessman, whose character is based on college athlete Seymour "Swede" Masin
- Jennifer Connelly as Dawn Dwyer Levov, a former beauty queen and wife of Seymour
- Dakota Fanning as teenaged through adult Meredith "Merry" Levov, daughter of Seymour and Dawn, who commits an act of political terrorism at the age of 16.
  - Ocean James as 8-year-old Merry
  - Hannah Nordberg as 12-year-old Merry
- Peter Riegert as Lou Levov, father of Seymour and a successful Jewish American businessman and glove manufacturer
- Rupert Evans as Jerry Levov, Seymour's younger brother
- Uzo Aduba as Vicky, a longtime employee at the glove factory
- Molly Parker as Dr. Sheila Smith, young Merry's speech therapist
- Valorie Curry as Rita Cohen, a mysterious woman
- Samantha Mathis as Penny Hamlin, wife of the murdered Rimrock store owner
- David Strathairn as Nathan Zuckerman, a former classmate of Jerry and narrator
- David Whalen as Bill Orcutt

== Production ==
In 2003, Lakeshore Entertainment started the development of the film, with Phillip Noyce attached to direct, and the film title shortened to Pastoral. Later, Paramount Pictures acquired the rights, and in May 2012, Fisher Stevens was hired to direct John Romano's adapted script, with Sidney Kimmel Entertainment attached as financier and producer along with Lakeshore. Jennifer Connelly and Paul Bettany were attached for the lead roles, along with Evan Rachel Wood as their characters' daughter. Tom Rosenberg and Gary Lucchesi were set as producers. Mandy Patinkin was attached to play one of the film's roles, and filming was set to take place in Pittsburgh.

On June 23, 2014, Ewan McGregor signed on to play the lead role of Seymour "Swede" Levov, a former high school star athlete and successful Jewish American businessman, replacing Bettany in the role. Phillip Noyce was again set to direct the film. On August 4, Connelly was confirmed to be playing Dawn Dwyer Levov, the former beauty queen and wife of Levov. On August 6, Dakota Fanning was added to the cast of the film to play the daughter, Merry Levov, the role once set for Wood.

On February 18, 2015, it was announced that McGregor would also direct the film, making his debut after Noyce left the project. On July 9, 2015, Valorie Curry joined the cast of the film to play Rita Cohen, a mysterious young woman from the group of radicals whom Merry has joined in protest against the government in general and the Vietnam War in particular, preceding her committing a bombing. On September 2, 2015, David Strathairn, Uzo Aduba, and Peter Riegert were added to the cast to play Swede's former classmate Nathan Zuckerman, Vicky, and Swede's father Lou Levov, respectively. Corey Stoll also joined the film for an unspecified role, though he did not appear in the finished film. On October 15, Rupert Evans signed on to play Seymour's younger brother, Jerry Levov. Molly Parker also joined the film.

Principal photography on the film commenced on September 21, 2015, in Harmony, Pennsylvania. Filming continued on location around Pittsburgh through November, including at the North Side, Downtown, Liberty Avenue, Wilkinsburg, Lawrenceville, and the grounds of the Pittsburgh Theological Seminary.

== Release ==
On April 28, 2016, it was announced that American Pastoral would be given a limited theatrical release on October 21, 2016, from Lionsgate, followed by a wider release on October 28.

== Reception ==
=== Box office ===
American Pastoral has grossed $544,098 in the U.S. and Canada and $1,171,630 in other countries for a worldwide total of $1,715,728.

=== Critical response ===
On review aggregator website Rotten Tomatoes, the film has an approval rating of 24%, based on 123 reviews, with an average rating of 4.9/10. The site's critical consensus reads, "American Pastoral finds debuting director Ewan McGregor's reach exceeding its grasp with a well-intentioned Philip Roth adaptation that retains the form, but little of the function, of its source material." On Metacritic, the film has a score 43 out of 100, based on 30 critics, indicating "mixed or average" reviews.

Toronto Star said the film "fails to illuminate the audience".

== See also ==
- The Weather Underground – a 2002 Oscar-nominated documentary film that also dealt with radical terrorism
- Domestic terrorism in the United States
- Lyndon B. Johnson – mentioned in the film
