= Weequahic, Newark =

Populated place in Essex County, New Jersey, US

Coordinates: 40°42′40″N 74°12′54″W

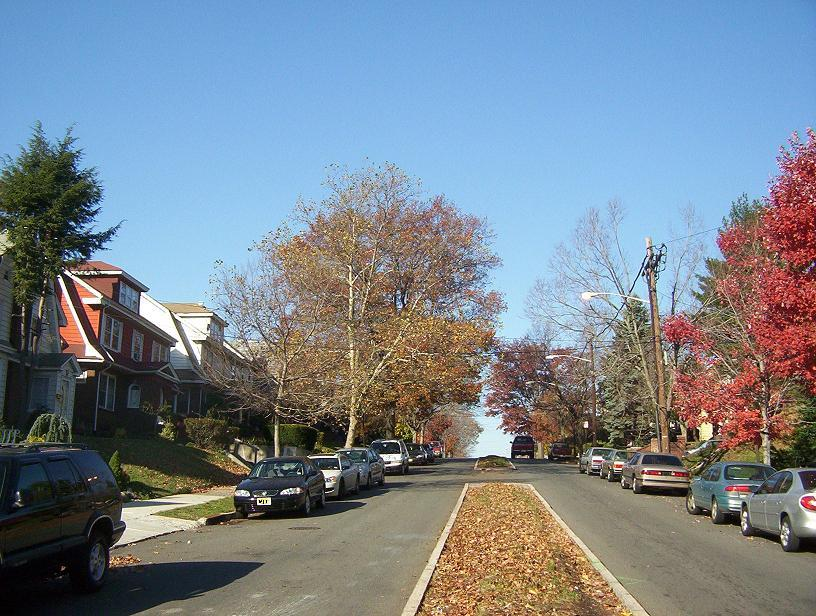
A residential street in Weequahic

Weequahic (pronounced wee-KWAY-ik or, "when spoken rapidly", week-wayk) is a neighborhood in the city of Newark in Essex County, in the U.S. state of New Jersey. Part of the South Ward, it is separated from Clinton Hill by Hawthorne Avenue on the north, and bordered by the township of Irvington on the west, Newark Liberty International Airport and Dayton on the east, and Hillside Township and the city of Elizabeth on the south. There are many well maintained homes and streets. Part of the Weequahic neighborhood has been designated a historic district; major streets are Lyons Avenue, Bergen Street, and Chancellor Avenue. Newark Beth Israel Medical Center is a major long-time institution in the neighborhood.

== History ==
The name "Weequahic" is Lenni-Lenape for "head of the cove". The area was farmland until the late nineteenth century when it was developed into a middle-class, non-industrial neighborhood of detached single-family homes oriented around Weequahic Park. Once the southernmost part of Clinton Township, it was the last portion of Clinton to be annexed into Newark in 1902.

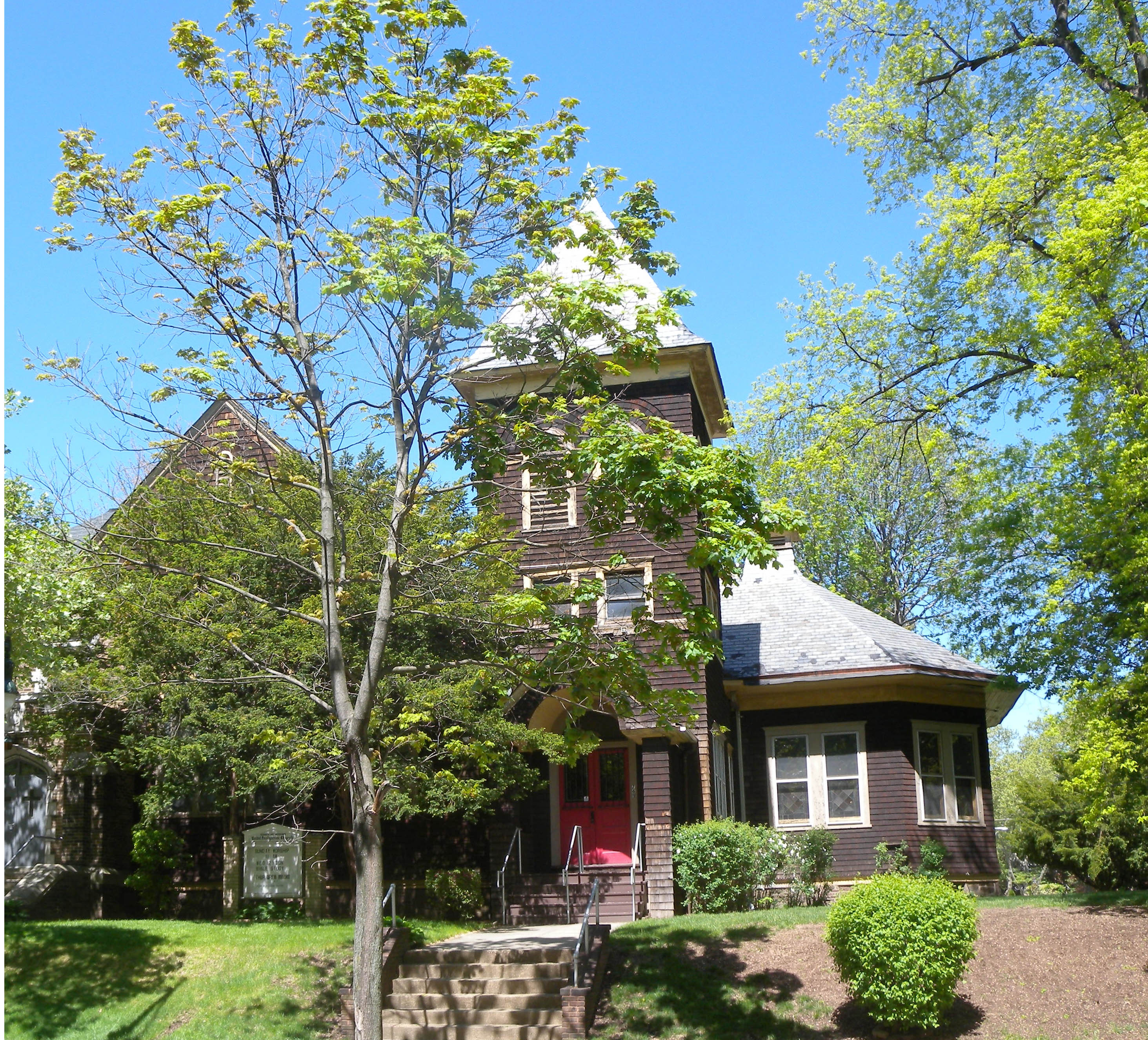
Elizabeth Avenue-Weequahic United Presbyterian Church

Weequahic was largely a middle class Jewish neighborhood until the late 1960s, home to many synagogues, yeshivas, and Jewish restaurants. Newark Beth Israel Medical Center (in Weequahic), the largest hospital in Newark, was built under the auspices of the Jewish community.

Author Philip Roth grew up on Summit Avenue, graduated from Weequahic High School in 1950, and many of his novels (such as American Pastoral and Nemesis) are set there. It was known as a predominantly Jewish school at the time. The 2009 documentary Heart of Stone, focuses on the school's decline from the 1950s, when it graduated more PhDs than any other high school in the country, to one of Newark, NJ's most poorly performing schools.

The post-World War II growth of suburbs and Second Great Migration of African Americans altered the demographic make-up of Newark in general and the Weequahic section in particular. Real estate blockbusting, white flight, and the construction of Interstate 78 were negative factors. The 1967 civil unrest was also devastating to the district.

== Weequahic Park ==
The jewel of the neighborhood is the 311-acre (1.26 km^{2}) Olmsted Brothers-designed Weequahic Park. This park has a 2.2 miles (3.5 km) rubberized jogging path around its 80-acre (320,000 m^{2}) lake and Weequahic Golf Course, the oldest public golf course in the United States. It is listed on the state and federal registers of historic places.

== Highrises on Elizabeth Avenue ==
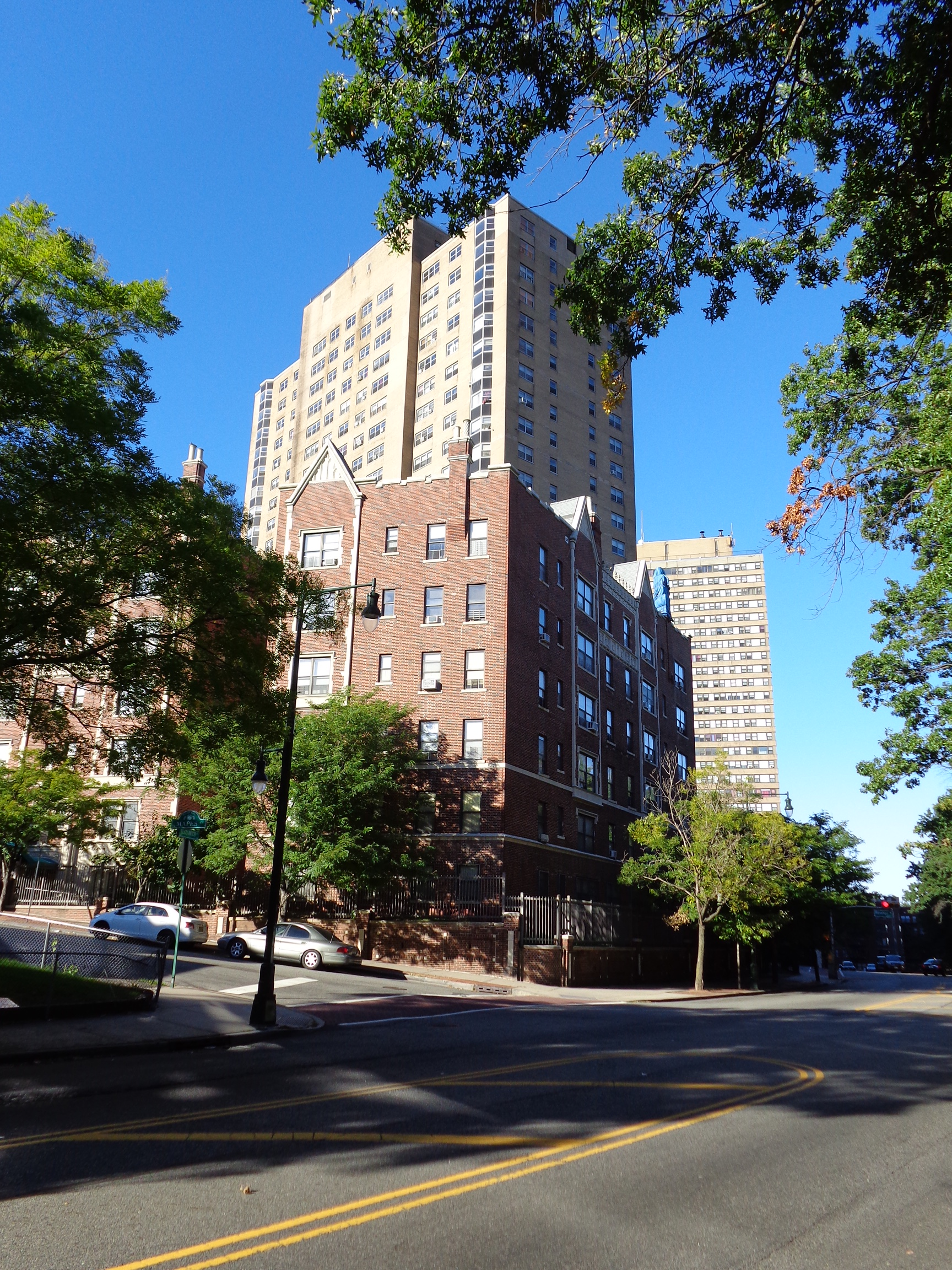
Elizabeth Avenue

Several highrise apartment buildings, among the tallest buildings in Newark, were built in the 1960s along the Elizabeth Avenue corridor opposite the park.

440 Elizabeth Avenue, formerly Carmel Towers, opened in 1970. The apartment building is 313 feet (95 m) and 25 stories tall. It offered subsidized housing, but later became a center of drug-dealing and gang violence until it was vacated in 2011. The buildings were sold in 2015, with plans for redevelopment and gut rehabilitation of its 216 apartments. As of 2025, it is being marketed as Cosmo 440.

Zion Towers, at 515 Elizabeth Avenue, opened in 1972 and is one of the tallest buildings in Newark. The apartment building is 313 feet (95 m) tall and has 29 stories with 268 apartments. It provides subsidized housing. The building was sold for $28 million in 2018 with plans to upgrade it.

Other buildings include the 22-story Elizabeth Towers at 455 and the 24-story Heritage Estates at 555.

== Education ==
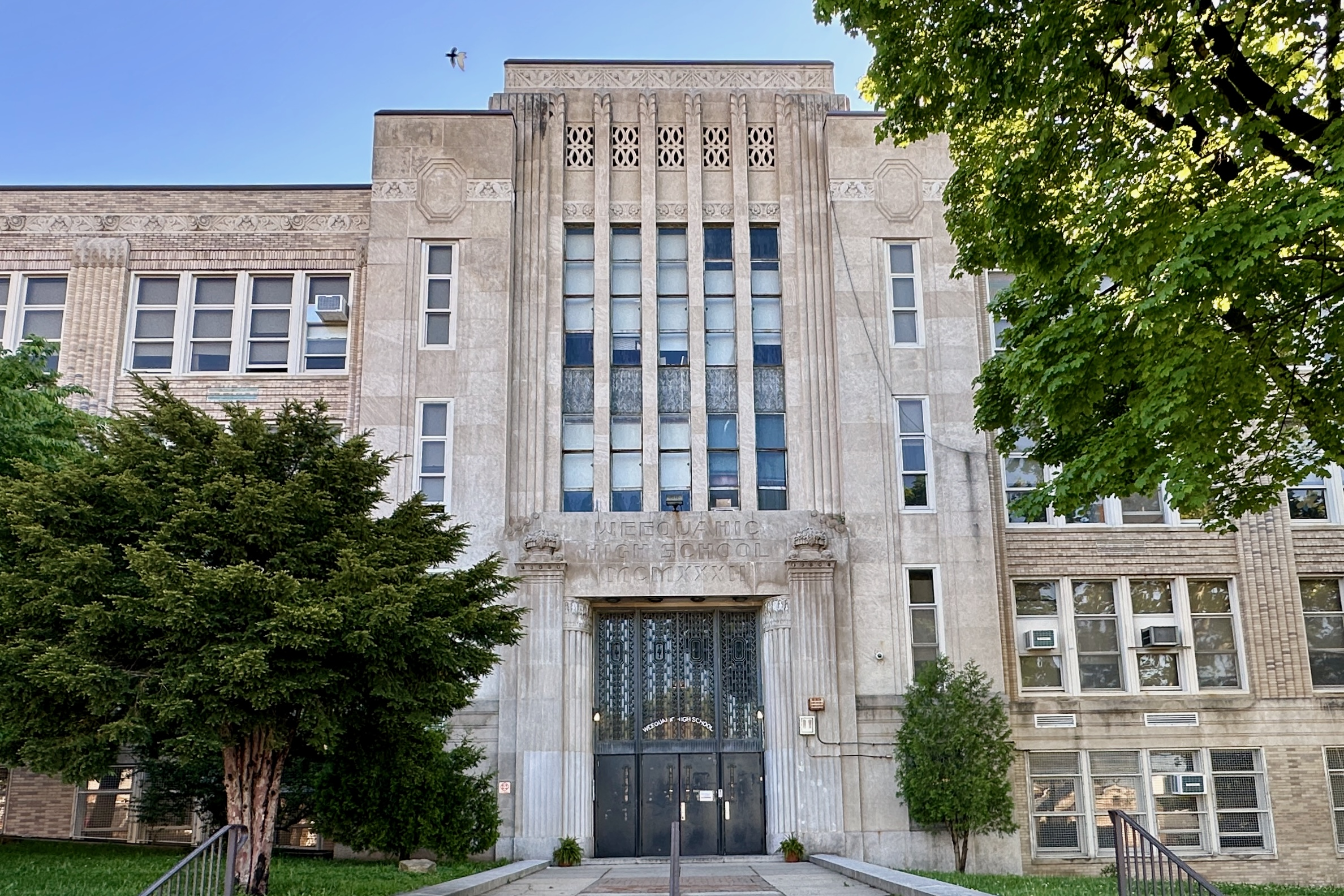
Weequahic High School

Newark Public Schools operates public schools. Weequahic High School serves the neighborhood. The 1931 Art Deco building that housed the Newark School of Fine and Industrial Art is in the neighborhood.

The Weequahic Branch Library of the Newark Public Library (NPL) serves the neighborhood. The branch, which opened in May 1929, was the sixth NPL branch to open between 1923 and 1946. In 1992 the library system renovated the branch for $1 million; the renovation added air conditioning, online public access computers, an elevator, new lighting, off-street parking, and a children's storytelling pit.
