= American Pastoral =

1997 novel by Philip Roth

- First edition cover
- Author: Philip Roth
- Language: English
- Genre: Novel
- Publisher: Houghton Mifflin
- Publication date: May 12, 1997
- Publication place: United States
- Media type: Print (hardcover)
- Pages: 423
- ISBN: 0-395-86021-0
- OCLC: 35969314
- Dewey Decimal: 813/.54 21
- LC Class: PS3568.O855 A77 1997

American Pastoral is a 1997 novel by American novelist Philip Roth. Its protagonist, Seymour "Swede" Levov, is a successful Jewish-American businessman and former high school star athlete from Newark, New Jersey. Levov's happy and conventional upper middle class life is ruined by the domestic social and political turmoil of the 1960s during the presidency of Lyndon B. Johnson, which in the novel is described as a manifestation of the "indigenous American berserk". It is the first in Roth's American Trilogy, followed by I Married a Communist (1998) and The Human Stain (2000).

The framing device in American Pastoral is a 45th high school reunion attended by Nathan Zuckerman, who is the narrator. At the reunion, in 1995, Zuckerman meets former classmate Jerry Levov who describes to him the tragic derailment of the life of his recently deceased older brother, Seymour "Swede" Levov. The second part of the novel consists of Zuckerman's posthumous recreation of Seymour's life, based on Jerry's revelation, newspaper clippings, and Zuckerman's own impressions after two brief run-ins with "the Swede".

American Pastoral won the Pulitzer Prize for Fiction in 1998. Seven years later, the novel was included in Time's List of the 100 Best Novels, a list covering the period between 1923 and 2005. The film rights to it were later optioned, although a film version was not made until 2016. In 2006, it was one of the runners-up to Toni Morrison's Beloved in the "What is the Best Work of American Fiction of the Last 25 Years?" contest held by the New York Times Book Review along with Don DeLillo's Underworld, Cormac McCarthy's Blood Meridian and John Updike's collected Rabbit Angstrom (consisting of Rabbit, Run, Rabbit Redux, Rabbit is Rich and Rabbit at Rest).

== Plot ==
Seymour Irving Levov is born and raised in the Weequahic section of Newark, New Jersey, in 1927 as the elder son of a successful Jewish American glove manufacturer, Lou Levov, and his wife Sylvia. Called "the Swede" because of his anomalous blond hair, blue eyes and Nordic good looks, Seymour is a star athlete in high school, a two-year veteran of the Marine Corps, and the narrator Nathan Zuckerman's idol and hero. Zuckerman and Seymour's younger brother, Jerry—who grows into a curmudgeonly, irascible heart surgeon with little empathy for the Swede—are schoolmates and close friends. The Swede eventually takes over his father's glove factory and marries Dawn Dwyer, a former beauty queen from nearby Elizabeth, whom he met in college. Following the death of the Swede from prostate cancer, Zuckerman writes an account of what he imagines the Swede's experiences would have been based on the little background information he receives from Jerry.

Seymour establishes what he believes to be a perfect American life with a beloved wife and daughter, a satisfying business career, and a magnificent house in the idyllic hamlet of Old Rimrock. Yet, as the Vietnam War and racial unrest wrack the country and destroy inner-city Newark, his precocious teenage daughter Meredith ("Merry"), beset by an emotionally debilitating stutter and outraged by the war, becomes increasingly radical in her beliefs. In February 1968, Merry plants a bomb in the Old Rimrock post office, which kills a bystander; she goes into permanent hiding. Seymour finds Merry five years later, living in deplorable conditions as a Jain in inner-city Newark. During this reunion, Merry reveals that she was responsible for several more bombings, killing three more people. Although Merry informs him that her actions were deliberate, Seymour decides to keep their meeting a secret, believing Merry has been manipulated by an unknown political group and a mysterious woman named Rita Cohen.

At a dinner party, Seymour discovers that his wife Dawn has been having an affair with Princeton-educated architect William Orcutt III, for whom she undergoes a facelift. Seymour then realizes that his wife is planning to leave him for Orcutt. It is revealed that Seymour himself previously had a short-term affair with Merry's speech therapist, Sheila Salzman, and that she and her husband Shelly hid Merry in their home after the post office bombing. Seymour sadly concludes that everyone he knows may have a veneer of respectability, but each engages in subversive behavior and that he cannot understand the truth about anyone based upon the conduct they outwardly display. He is forced to see the truth about the chaos and discord rumbling beneath the "American pastoral", which has brought about profound personal and societal changes he no longer can ignore. Simultaneously, the dinner party underscores the fact that no one ever truly understands the hearts of other people.

== Historical setting ==
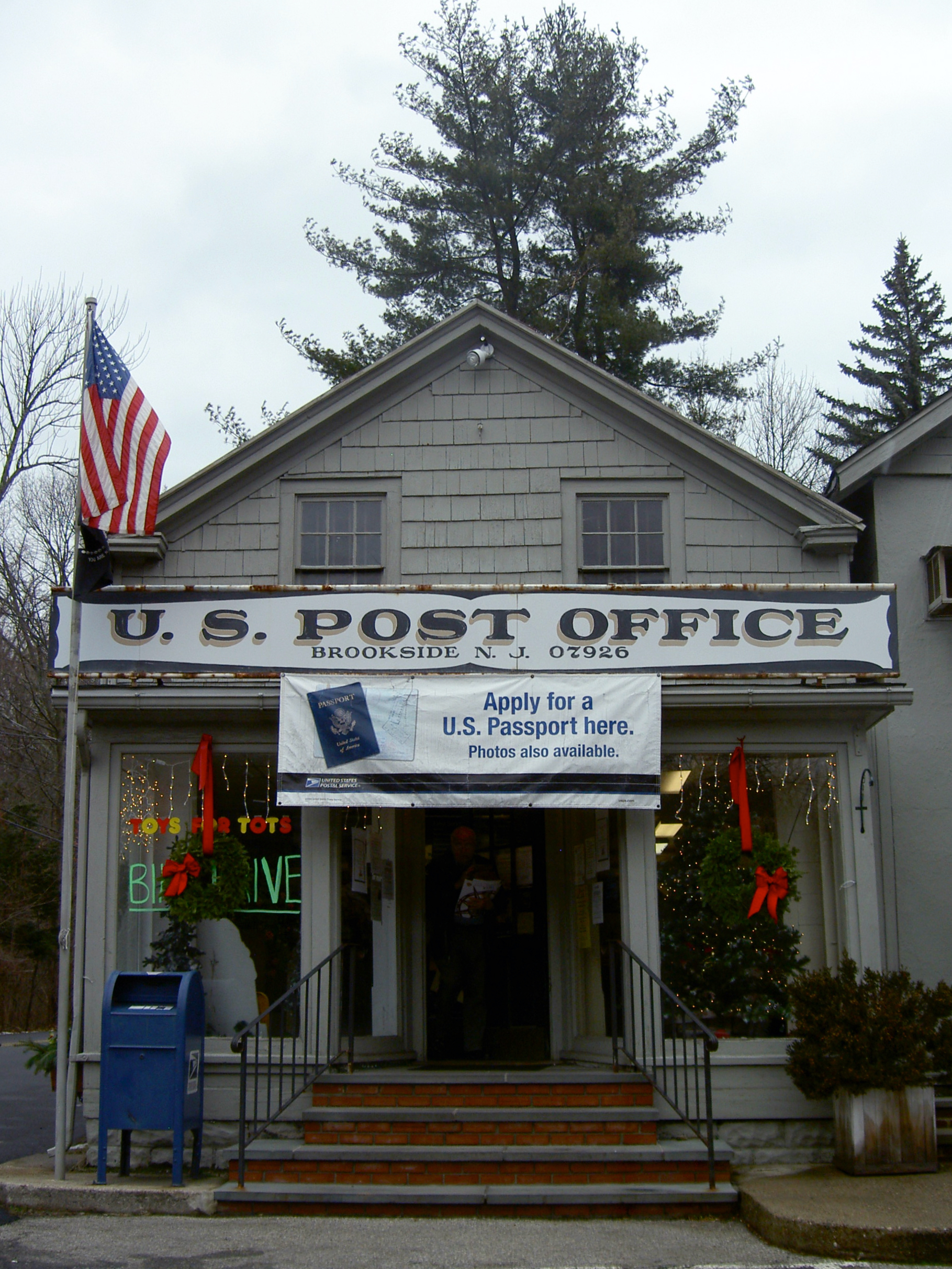
Brookside, New Jersey post office

The novel refers to the 1967 Newark riots, the Watergate scandal, the sexual revolution and Deep Throat, the code name of the secret source in the Watergate scandal and the title of a 1972 pornographic film. In the novel's final scene, both the Watergate scandal and the pornographic film are discussed at a dinner party during which the first marriage of "the Swede" begins to unravel when he discovers that his wife is having an affair. The novel also alludes to the rhetoric of revolutionary violence of the radical fringe of the New Left, the Black Panthers, the trial of the leftist African-American activist Angela Davis, and the bombings carried out between 1969 and 1973 by the Weathermen and other radicals opposing the US military intervention in Vietnam. The novel quotes from Frantz Fanon's A Dying Colonialism, which Zuckerman imagines as one of the texts that inspires Merry to carry out her bombing of a local post office.

The inspiration for the Levov character was a real person: Seymour "Swede" Masin, a Jewish athlete who, like the Levov character, attended Newark's Weequahic High School. Like the book's protagonist, Swede Masin was revered and idolized by many local middle-class Jews. Both "Swedes" were tall and had distinctively blond hair and blue eyes, which stood out among the typically dark-haired, dark-complexioned local residents. Both attended a teachers' college in nearby East Orange; both married out of their faith; both served in the military and, upon their return, both moved to the suburbs of Newark.

For research, Roth traveled to Gloversville, New York, to learn about the glove-making industry and interviewed Yolande Fox, the winner of the 1951 Miss America pageant, while developing the character of Dawn Dwyer. Roth later said, of his conversations with Fox, "She was very smart, very funny. ... She just opened up whole ideas for me that I couldn't have had on my own."

The book cover features a photo of the post office in Brookside, New Jersey. In the book American Anti-Pastoral: Brookside, New Jersey and the Garden State of Philip Roth (2024), literary historian Thomas Gustafson argues that Old Rimrock is based on Brookside, drawing connections between the political histories of the fictional town and real town.

== Reception ==
After Roth's death, The New York Times asked several prominent writers to pick their favorite work by Roth, and many picked American Pastoral. Richard Ford, in his response, wrote, "The fusing powers of Roth's imagination, conviction and raging intelligence are everywhere evident and exhilarating. There is about it a profound and heartening sense (and it is a profound book) that the verbal construction you're undertaking as a reader represents absolutely the only way this mighty story could ever be brought into existence. American Pastoral stares back at me audaciously unblinking as a great novel. And although such a rambunctious piece of artifice can inevitably not be perfect, it is nonetheless in all its ways right." Stephen King also chose it as his favorite Roth novel, writing, "American Pastoral is one of the five best novels I have ever read, maybe the best. It is muscular storytelling complemented by characters — especially Swede Levov — who burn their way into one's memory. The scope is relatively small, but the ambition is epic. Few can handle the passing years as well as Roth does here. It ranks with the greatest of American fiction." Harold Bloom named Roth one of the greatest living American authors, alongside Cormac McCarthy, Thomas Pynchon and Don DeLillo, naming their respective masterpieces as Sabbath's Theater and American Pastoral; Blood Meridian; The Crying of Lot 49, Gravity's Rainbow, and Mason & Dixon; and Underworld.

== Film adaptation ==
Ewan McGregor directed and starred in the film along with Jennifer Connelly and Dakota Fanning. Filming began in Pittsburgh, Pennsylvania, in September 2015, and the film premiered at the Toronto International Film Festival in September 2016.
