= Parsonnet =

Parsonnet is a surname. Notable people with the surname include:

- Julie Parsonnet, New Jersey-born physician and infectious disease expert
- Marion Parsonnet (1905–1960), American screenwriter and producer of film and television
- Victor Parsonnet (1924–2024), American cardiac surgeon
