= Newark City Cemetery =

Defunct cemetery in Essex County, New Jersey

- Interactive map of Newark City Cemetery

Details
- Established: 1869
- Location: Bessemer St. Newark, New Jersey
- Country: United States
- Coordinates: 40°42′00″N 74°11′25″W
- Type: public
- Size: 5.2 acres (2.1 ha)
- Find a Grave: Newark City Cemetery

Newark City Cemetery, also known as Newark Municipal Graveyard and Floral Rest, in Newark, New Jersey is a no-longer-used potter's field, or cemetery for the indigent. It was in use from 1869 until the early 1950s.

An 1889 report of the Department of Health of the State of New Jersey found with respect to the no-longer extant Clinton Township, which once included the area: "There are two cemeteries, or burial-places, in the township – Clinton cemetery, in the village and upon the banks of Elizabeth River, and Newark potter's field, down in the salt meadow section". Located in the Dayton neighborhood on Bessemer St. near Newark Airport and is prominently visible from the monorail serving it.

The city began using the cemetery as a dump in 1954, until it was ordered to restore it in 1998.

The area has been restored, but as of 2010 it is closed to the public.

== See also ==
- Hudson County Burial Grounds
- Mount Olivet Cemetery (Newark)
