= Swede Masin =

American basketball player

Seymour "Swede" Masin (June 7, 1920 – September 10, 2005) was a high school and college athlete of great versatility. He briefly played professional basketball in the American Basketball League, a precursor to the National Basketball Association. He is known for having inspired the character Seymour "Swede" Levov in Philip Roth's novel American Pastoral.

== Early years ==
Seymour Masin was born June 7, 1920, in Newark, New Jersey, the son of Sophie and Max Masin, who were Russian-Jewish immigrants. He grew up in the predominantly Jewish Weequahic section of the city, and attended Weequahic High School. Even today, more than seventy years later, he is considered the school's best athlete ever. In his day, Masin was arguably New Jersey's best football, basketball, and track-and-field athlete. His appearance earned him the nickname "Swede".

After graduating from high school, Masin went to Panzer College, a small teacher's college in nearby East Orange, which merged with Montclair State Teachers College in 1958. At Panzer, Masin again played three sports. He was the best in the state in the shot put and discus, he was named to the Coaches’ All-American team in soccer (which he took up due to parental objections to him playing American football), and he was the star of the tiny school's basketball team, which won 44 straight games, a collegiate record at the time.

Swede was among the inaugural inductees for the halls of fame for Weequahic High School, Panzer College, and Newark, New Jersey. In 2000, he was named one of New Jersey's top fifty all-around high school athletes of the twentieth century.

== Military ==
Upon graduating from Panzer in 1942, Masin served as a lieutenant in the United States Navy during World War II. He captained a minesweeper, and spent much of his tour of duty patrolling the waters off the coasts of Italy, France, and North Africa.

== Later life ==
In 1946, Swede married Estelle Lepore, also a Weequahic High School graduate. They raised two sons and two daughters, and lived in South Orange, New Jersey. Masin was a liquor salesman for fifty years.

In the late 1990s, Masin attracted much attention, thanks to Philip Roth’s Pulitzer Prize winning novel American Pastoral (1997). He was the inspiration for the novel’s central character, Seymour "Swede" Levov—also a legendary Jewish athlete at Newark's Weequahic High School, who later attended a teacher's college in nearby East Orange and married out of his faith. Although Roth had never met Seymour "Swede" Masin until after the publication of American Pastoral, he also had grown up in the Weequahic section of Newark and never denied that his character was based in part on Masin.

Seymour "Swede" Masin died September 10, 2005, in Atlantic Highlands, New Jersey, from complications of Alzheimer's disease. The title of his obituary was "Seymour ‘Swede’ Masin, Newark's Humble Sports Icon."

His son Robert G. Masin wrote a biography of him titled Swede: Weequahic’s Gentle Giant (iUniverse, 2009).
