= Mount Olivet Cemetery (Newark) =

Cemetery in Newark, New Jersey

- Interactive map of Mount Olivet Cemetery

Details
- Location: Mount Olivet Ave, Newark, New Jersey
- Country: United States
- Coordinates: 40.690°N 74.197°W
- No. of graves: 17,000+
- Website: Official website
- Find a Grave: Mount Olivet Cemetery

Mount Olivet Cemetery is a cemetery in the Dayton section of Newark in the U.S. state of New Jersey founded in 1871. It is part of the Roman Catholic Archdiocese of Newark.

Mount Olivet, or Mount of Olives, (Hebrew: הַר הַזֵּיתִים, Har ha-Zeitim; Arabic: جبل الزيتون, الطور, Jabal al-Zaytun, Al-Tur) is a mountain ridge east of and adjacent to Jerusalem's Old City.

The Newark City Cemetery is located nearby.

== Notable burials ==
- John T. Dunn (1838–1907), represented New Jersey in the United States House of Representatives from 1893 to 1895.
- Charles P. Gillen (1876–1956), Mayor of Newark, New Jersey from 1917 to 1921.
