= Donald Kornfeld =

American psychiatrist

Donald S. Kornfeld (1929-2022) was an American psychiatrist best known for his work on psychiatric issues associated with medical practice. This subspecialty is known as Consultation-Liaison Psychiatry or Psychosomatic Medicine.

== Education and career ==
Donald S. Kornfeld was a graduate of Weequahic High School, class of 1946. Kornfeld received a BS from Franklin and Marshall College in 1946, and an MD from Yale School of Medicine in 1954. He received his psychiatric training at the New York State Psychiatric Institute/Presbyterian Hospital. He received a certificate from the Columbia University Institute for Psychoanalysis in 1966.

He served as Director of the Psychiatric Consultation/Liaison Service at the Presbyterian Hospital from 1964–2000, and in 1986, in association with Richard Sloan, established the Behavioral Medicine Service.

He was appointed Associate Dean of the Columbia University College of Physicians and Surgeons in 1985, and served as Director of Continuing Medical Education from 1988-2009. He was Chairman of the Institutional Review Board at the New York State Psychiatric Institute from 1979 to 1985 and the Columbia Presbyterian Medical Center from 1988 to 2001. He is currently Professor Emeritus of Psychiatry.

== Research ==
Kornfeld’s research has concentrated on the interface between medicine and psychiatry, and often appears in medical and surgical journals.

His description of post-cardiotomy delirium and his subsequent work on the psychiatric impact of the intensive care environment led to the concept of ICU Psychosis. This work created a greater awareness of the psychological impact of the ICU environment on patients and staff, focused attention on human needs, and influenced the architectural design of these units.

In 1971, Kornfeld, Richard Friedman, and JT Bigger demonstrated the deleterious effects of sleep deprivation on medical house officers. This led to a nationwide change in the scheduling of on-call duty from every other night to every third night.

A paper by Kornfeld and Harry D. Albert on patients’ threats to sign out of a general hospital against advice was the first publication to point out the complex array of motivations and circumstances which contribute to such problems.

Kornfeld and Stephan Levitan demonstrated that the presence of a psychiatrist on an orthopedic unit reduced length of hospital stay and increased the likelihood of patients returning to home. This paper was widely used to demonstrate the cost effectiveness of the liaison psychiatrist in the general hospital.

At a time when clinicians were being compelled to always be “truthful” with their patients, he pointed out the complexity of that principle in, “What Truth for Which Patient at What Time?”

Kornfeld initiated one of the first studies to utilize the denervated human heart, created at the time of cardiac transplantation, as the basis for the study of the psychophysiology of cardiac rhythm.

To accompany the establishment of Consultation Liaison Psychiatry as an established subspecialty, Kornfeld reviewed its contributions to the practice of Medicine.

Most recently he has explored the problem of research misconduct in an effort to develop remedies from the perspective of a psychiatrist.

Kornfeld and Gerry Finkel co-edited the book, Psychiatric Management for Medical Practitioners (1982, Grune and Stratton). Kornfeld also contributed chapters to textbooks in general psychiatry, consultation liaison psychiatry, medicine, and surgery. He served on the editorial boards of the journals, General Hospital Psychiatry and Psychosomatic Medicine, and on the editorial boards of the Lippincott Textbook of Psychiatry; Medical Psychiatric Practice, Textbook of Consultation Liaison Psychiatry ([APA] Press); and the Columbia University Electronic Textbook, Cardinal Topics in Medicine.

He was elected President of the American Psychosomatic Society; received the Hackett Award for his contributions to Consultation/Liaison Psychiatry from the Academy of Psychosomatic Medicine, and a Special Citation from the Society of Liaison Psychiatry. He served as Chairman of the Consultation/Liaison Committee of the American Psychiatric Association.
