= Clinton Cemetery =

- Interactive map of Clinton Cemetery

Details
- Established: 1844
- Location: 195 Union Avenue; Irvington, New Jersey
- Country: United States
- Coordinates: 40.728822°N 74.233985°W
- Type: non-sectarian private
- Size: 10.5 acres (4.2 ha)
- No. of graves: 11,000
- Website: http://www.clintoncemetery.org/
- Find a Grave: Clinton Cemetery

Clinton Cemetery is a cemetery in Irvington, Essex County, New Jersey. The non-sectarian lot-owner owned cemetery comprises 10.5 acres (4.2 ha) near Union Avenue and Lyons Avenue; the Elizabeth River lies at its western boundary. There have been approximately 12,500 burials.

== History ==
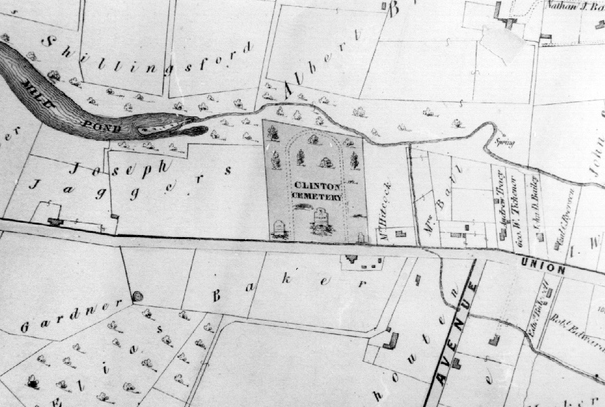
Early map of Clinton Cemetery showing Elizabeth River

Clinton Cemetery Association was founded on Feb 28, 1844. At the time Irvington was beginning to form as Camptown, an unincorporated village in the no-longer extant Clinton Township. In 1852 Camptown's name was changed to Irvington. (Editing note, Irvington was not incorporated until March 27, 1874. 1852 is referring to Clinton Township, which Irvington was a part of until 1874.) An 1889 report of the Department of Health of the State of New Jersey found with respect to the township of Clinton: "There are two cemeteries, or burial-places, in the township – Clinton cemetery, in the village and upon the banks of Elizabeth river, and Newark potter's field, down in the salt meadow section". Purchases of ground between 1856 and 1928 expanded the cemetery to its present size.

In 2010, Clinton Cemetery was the site of two sexual assaults conducted by the same man several months apart; the offender was captured by police in the cemetery on the second occasion.

== Notable burials ==
- More than 500 veterans, including two from the American Revolutionary War and many from the American Civil War.
- Four mayors of Irvington: John Van Cleve, James Mortland, Edward Folsom, William L. Glorieux
- Amos J. Cummings (1838–1902), United States Representative from New York
- Joseph E. Haynes (1826–1897), 20th Mayor of Newark, New Jersey, 1884–1894.
