= Weequahic High School =

High school in Newark, New Jersey, United States

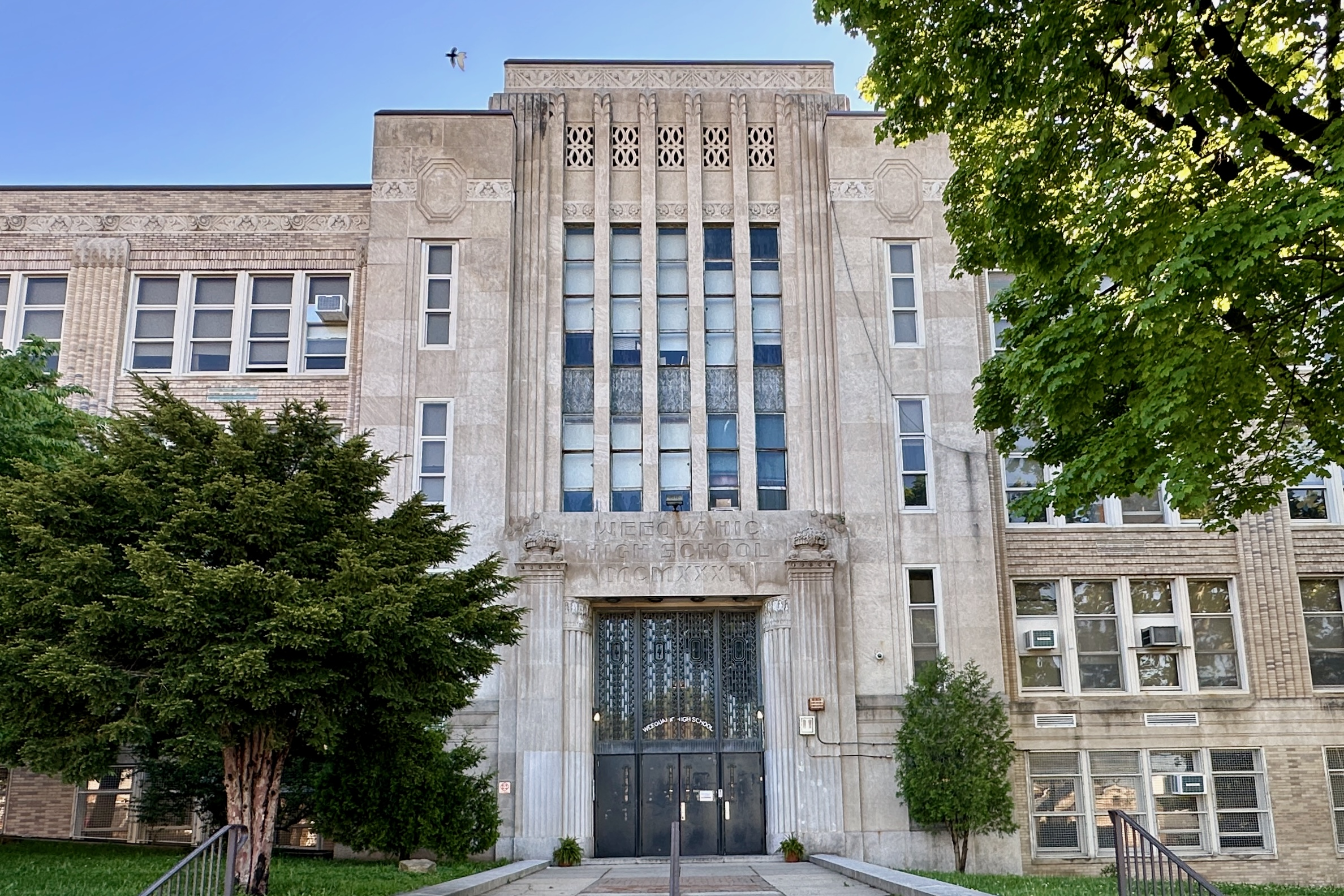
- Front entrance

Location
- 279 Chancellor Avenue; Newark, Essex County, New Jersey 07112; United States; 40°42′33″N 74°13′13″W

Information
- Type: Public high school
- Established: 1933; 93 years ago
- School district: Newark Public Schools
- NCES School ID: 341134002206
- Principal: Kyle Thomas
- Faculty: 36.0 FTEs
- Grades: 9-12
- Enrollment: 592 (as of 2024–25)
- Student to teacher ratio: 16.4:1
- Colors: Orange and Brown
- Athletics conference: Super Essex Conference (general); North Jersey Super Football Conference (football)
- Team name: Indians
- Rivals: Malcolm X Shabazz High School
- Publication: Ergo
- Newspaper: The Calumet
- Yearbook: The Legend
- Website: www.nps.k12.nj.us/WEQ/
- Weequahic High School
- U.S. National Register of Historic Places
- Architects: Guilbert and Betelle
- NRHP reference No.: 100010170
- Added to NRHP: April 11, 2024

Weequahic High School is a four-year comprehensive public high school serving students in ninth through twelfth grades, located in the Weequahic section of Newark in Essex County, in the U.S. state of New Jersey. The school is operated by the Newark Public Schools and is located at 279 Chancellor Avenue. The school is accredited until July 2031 and has been accredited by the Middle States Association of Colleges and Schools Commission on Elementary and Secondary Schools since 1935. The school was listed on the New Jersey Register and the National Register of Historic Places in 2024.

As of the 2024–25 school year, the school had an enrollment of 592 students and 36.0 classroom teachers (on an FTE basis), for a student–teacher ratio of 16.4:1. There were 390 students (65.9% of enrollment) eligible for free lunch and 27 (4.6% of students) eligible for reduced-cost lunch.

== Awards, recognition and rankings ==
The school was the 325th-ranked public high school in New Jersey out of 339 schools statewide in New Jersey Monthly magazine's September 2014 cover story on the state's "Top Public High Schools", using a new ranking methodology. The school had been ranked 258th in the state of 328 schools in 2012, after being ranked 310th in 2010 out of 322 schools listed. The magazine ranked the school 305th in 2008 out of 316 schools. The school was ranked 308th in the magazine's September 2006 issue, which surveyed 316 schools across the state. Schooldigger.com ranked the school 353rd out of 376 public high schools statewide in its 2010 rankings (an increase of 6 positions from the 2009 rank) which were based on the combined percentage of students classified as proficient or above proficient on the language arts literacy and mathematics components of the High School Proficiency Assessment (HSPA).

== History ==
Construction of the high school was completed in 1932 and classes began in September 1933. Max J. Herzberg was the first principal and remained as the leader of the high school for 18 years until his retirement in 1951.

The high school is home to the New Deal era mural "Enlightenment of Man" painted by Michael Lenson who was director of New Jersey mural activities for the Federal Art Project of the Works Progress Administration (WPA).

The Weequahic section of Newark, which is the neighborhood sending students to the high school, was described as it was in the 1930s and early 1940s by Weequahic alumnus Philip Roth in The Plot Against America and in the miniseries based on the book.

Weequahic High School has an active alumni association that raises scholarship monies for the students.

The 2009 documentary film Heart of Stone is about Ron Stone, former principal of the high school and his efforts to work with students and further the mission of the high school. This documentary was presented at the Sundance Film Festival and has been shown in selected venues.

== Athletics ==
The Weequahic High School Indians compete in the Super Essex Conference, which is comprised of public and private high schools in Essex County and was established after a reorganization of sports leagues in Northern New Jersey under the supervision of the New Jersey State Interscholastic Athletic Association (NJSIAA). Prior to the NJSIAA's 2009 realignment, the school had participated in the Hills Division of the Iron Hills Conference, which included schools in Essex, Morris and Union counties. With 276 students in grades 10-12, the school was classified by the NJSIAA for the 2019–20 school year as Group I for most athletic competition purposes, which included schools with an enrollment of 75 to 476 students in that grade range. The football team competes in the National White division of the North Jersey Super Football Conference, which includes 112 schools competing in 20 divisions, making it the nation's biggest football-only high school sports league. The school was classified by the NJSIAA as Group III North for football for 2024–2026, which included schools with 700 to 884 students. The school's athletic teams are called the Indians and its colors are orange and brown.

The boys' basketball team won its first Group IV state championship in 1962 (defeating Westfield High School in the tournament final) and repeated as state champions in 1966 (vs. Hackensack High School), 1967 (vs. Camden High School) and 1973 (vs. Atlantic City High School) and won the Group II title in 2001 (vs. Pleasantville High School). Lester Fein was the coach of the basketball team in the 1960s, coaching many winning teams. A crowd of 4,500 watched as the 1962 team won the Group IV title with a 55–52 victory against Westfield in the championship game to finish the season with a record of 24–3. A 62–38 win against Hackensack in the championship game played at Convention Hall in Atlantic City gave the team a 25-1 season record and the Group IV state title. In 1967, the team finished the season with a 26–0 record after winning the state Group IV title with an 80–60 win against Camden in the championship game played in front of a tournament-record 12,000 spectators at Atlantic City's Convention Hall. The 1967 team was listed as the number-one ranked team in the country and extended the school's winning streak to 40 games. Some of his players went on to play in the National Basketball Association. The 2002 boys' basketball won the North II, Group III state sectional championship, edging West Side High School in the tournament final.

The football team won the NJSIAA Central Jersey Group II state sectional championship in 2006 and the North II Group I title in 2016. The sectional title win in 2006 was the first ever for Weequahic and the first for a Newark high school since 1975. Coach Altariq White was named state Coach of the Year and Amara Kamara was selected as the state Defensive Player of the Year. In 2016, in the first sectional title game played between two Newark high schools, the football team defeated Malcolm X Shabazz High School by a score of 18–8 to win the North II, Group I championship, the program's second sectional title in the playoff era. 2009 marked the return of the Thanksgiving Day game called the "Soul Bowl" between Weequahic and Shabazz High School, which had last been played in 1993 and had been in abeyance due to the two schools being placed in different athletic conferences. The 2011 game was the 29th between the two teams, ending in a 27–20 win for Weequahic, which won its fifth consecutive defeat of Shabazz. The intra-district football rivalry with Shabazz was ranked third on NJ.com's 2017 list "Ranking the 31 fiercest rivalries in N.J. HS football". Shabazz leads the series with an overall record of 35–28–6 through the 2017 season.

The boys' winter track team won the state relay championship in Group III in 1991 and 1992, and won in Group I in 2016. The girls team won in Group I in 2015

The girls spring track team was Group III champion in 1991 and won the Group I title in 2015.

The boys track team won the Group I spring / outdoor track state championship in 2016.

== Extracurricular activities ==
The high school newspaper is The Calumet, the literary magazine is Ergo, and the yearbook is called The Legend. The school's student governing body is the Orange and Brown Association (OBA).

== Administration ==
The school's principal is Kyle Thomas. His administration team includes three vice principals.

== Notable alumni ==
Notable alumni of Weequahic High School include:

- Janet Abu-Lughod (1928–2013, class of 1946), urban sociologist
- Daniel M. Albert (born 1936), ophthalmologist, ocular cancer researcher, medical historian, and collector of rare books and ocular equipment
- Hasson Arbubakrr (born 1960, class of 1979), former American football defensive end who played in the NFL with the Minnesota Vikings and Tampa Bay Buccaneers, and in the CFL with the Winnipeg Blue Bombers and Ottawa Rough Riders
- Al Attles (1936–2024, class of 1955), former NBA basketball player who was head coach of the Golden State Warriors from 1970 to 1983
- Al "Bubba" Baker (born 1956, class of 1972), former NFL defensive lineman
- Seymour Bernstein (born 1927, class of 1945), pianist, composer and teacher who was the subject of the documentary Seymour: An Introduction directed by Ethan Hawke
- Susan Bordo (born 1947, class of 1964), feminist philosopher
- Eunice Dwumfour (1993–2023, class of 2010), member of the borough council of Sayreville, New Jersey, from 2021 until her assassination
- Sherman Edwards (1919–1981), songwriter best known for his songs from the 1969 Broadway musical 1776 and the 1972 film adaptation
- Martin S. Fox (1924–2020), publisher who served as President of the Jewish Telegraphic Agency
- Muriel Fox (born 1928, class of 1945), public relations executive who co-founded the National Organization for Women in 1966
- Marvin E. Frankel (1920–2002, class of 1937), United States district judge of the United States District Court for the Southern District of New York and human rights activist
- Norbert Freinkel (1926–1989), endocrinologist and diabetes researcher
- Allen Garfield (1939–2020, class of 1957), film and television actor
- Edward K. Gill (1917–1985), politician who served as Mayor of Cranford and was elected to two terms of office in the New Jersey General Assembly, where he represented the 21st Legislative District
- Ina Golub (1938-2015), fiber artist who specialized in Judaica
- Paul Goodman (class of 1945), Grammy Award-winning sound engineer
- Lorraine Gordon (1922–2018, class of 1937), jazz music advocate who was best known as the owner of the Village Vanguard jazz club in Greenwich Village
- Robert J. Gorlin (1923–2006, class of 1940), oral pathologist, human geneticist and academic at the University of Minnesota School of Dentistry
- Martin L. Greenberg (1932–2024, class of 1950), politician and jurist who served in the New Jersey Senate from 1974 to 1979
- Jerry Greenspan (1942–2019), NBA basketball player
- Sandy Grossman (1935-2014, class of 1953), television sports director of 10 Super Bowls, 18 NBA Finals and five Stanley Cup finals
- Ben Hawkins (1944-2017), professional American football wide receiver who played in the NFL for the Philadelphia Eagles and Cleveland Browns, and for the Philadelphia Bell of the World Football League
- Stanley Herr (1945–2001, class of 1963), President of the American Association on Mental Retardation, University of Maryland law professor and activist for the rights of the mentally disabled
- Reggie Jones (born 1951), retired boxer who represented the U.S. at the 1972 Summer Olympics, where he was controversially eliminated in a fight he was generally accepted to have won
- Amara Kamara (born 1988), starting linebacker for the Temple Owls football team
- Arnie Kantrowitz (1940–2022), LGBT activist and college professor
- Irwin I. Kimmelman (1930–2014), politician who served in both houses of the New Jersey Legislature and served as the Attorney General of New Jersey from 1982 – 1986
- Sandra King (born 1946), American television broadcast journalist and primetime news anchor for the New Jersey Network
- Allen Klein (1931–2009, class of 1950), businessman, music publisher, writers' representative and record label executive
- Donald Kornfeld (c. 1929–2022), psychiatrist best known for his work on psychiatric issues associated with medical practice
- Barbara Kruger (born 1945, class of 1963), conceptual artist
- Mo Layton (born 1948, class of 1967), retired American professional basketball point guard who played in the NBA for six seasons
- Michael Lerner (1943-2024, class of 1960), rabbi, political activist and editor of Tikkun magazine
- Dana Lewis (born 1949, class of 1967), retired professional basketball player
- Swede Masin (1920–2005), early professional basketball player
- Joseph S. Murphy (1933–1998, class of 1951), political scientist and university administrator, who was President of Queens College, President of Bennington College, and Chancellor of the City University of New York
- Sheila Oliver (1952–2023, class of 1970), politician who served as the Lieutenant Governor of New Jersey from 2018 until her death, before which she served in the New Jersey General Assembly from 2004 to 2018, where she represented the 34th legislative district
- Sherry Ortner (born 1941, class of 1958), cultural anthropologist
- Victor Parsonnet (1924-2024), cardiac surgeon who contributed significantly to the evolution of cardiac pacemaking
- Bo Porter (born 1972, class of 1990), coach and executive with the Atlanta Braves, who was manager of the Houston Astros from 2013 to 2014
- Richie Roberts (born 1937), former law enforcement officer and disbarred attorney who was played by Russell Crowe in the 2007 film American Gangster
- Philip Roth (1933–2018), author, whose works — notably Portnoy's Complaint — have mentioned the school
- Reese Schonfeld (1931–2020), television journalist, who was co-founder of CNN and the Food Network
- Jason Seley (1919–1983), sculptor, educator and academic administrator
- David Shapiro (1947-2024, class of 1964), poet and art historian
- Howard Smith (1936-2014, class of 1955), Oscar-winning film director, producer, journalist, screenwriter, actor and radio broadcaster
- Margery Tabankin (born 1948, class of 1965), progressive political activist who served as head of AmeriCorps VISTA
- Akrum Wadley (born 1995), American football running back
- Milton Waldor (1924–1975), politician who served in the New Jersey State Senate from 1968 to 1972, representing Essex County
- Naomi Wilzig (1934–2015), writer and art collector, who is the director and owner of World Erotic Art Museum Miami
- Jack Wolf (1935–2011, class of 1952), researcher in information theory and coding theory

== See also ==
- Weequahic, Newark
- Weequahic Park
- Weequahic Golf Course
