= Daniel M. Albert =

American ophthalmologist, ocular cancer researcher and medical historian

Daniel Albert
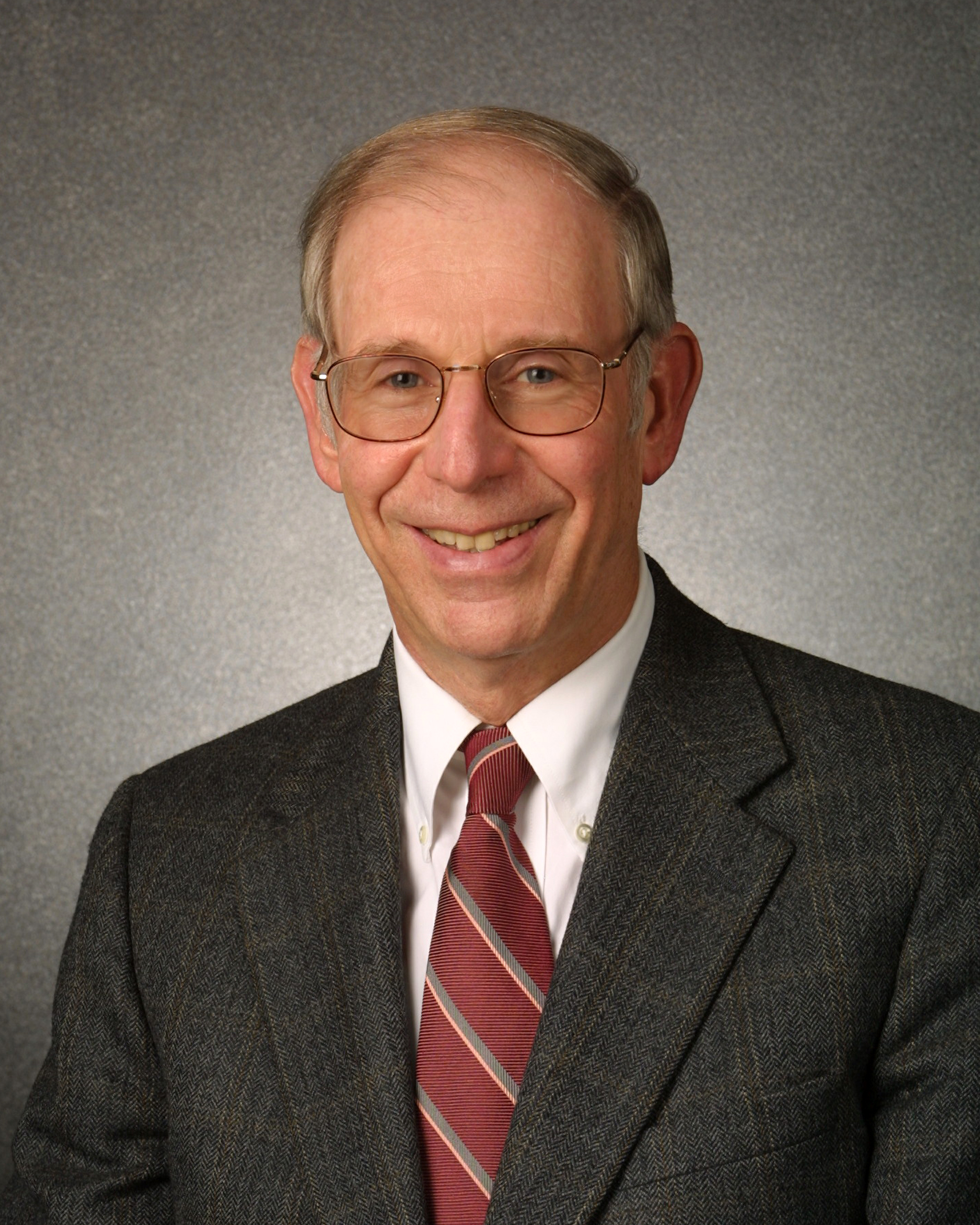
- Born: December 19, 1936 (age 89); Newark, New Jersey
- Education: Franklin and Marshall University; University of Pennsylvania
- Medical career
- Profession: Ophthalmologist, Researcher
- Research: Melanoma, Retinoblastoma

Daniel M. Albert (born December 19, 1936) is an American ophthalmologist, ocular cancer researcher, medical historian, and collector of rare books and ocular equipment. As of 2018, he is Professor of Ophthalmology at the Casey Eye Institute, Oregon Health & Science University.

== Early life and education ==
Albert was born in Newark, New Jersey, on December 19, 1936. He attended Weequahic High School. He studied biology at Franklin and Marshall University in Lancaster, Pennsylvania, graduating cum laude with a Bachelor of Science degree in 1958. He earned his medical degree in 1962 from the University of Pennsylvania.

== Medical and academic career ==
Between 1963 and 1966, Albert completed a residency in ophthalmology at the University of Pennsylvania, where he worked under ophthalmologist, Harold Scheie. During the last year of his residency, he was appointed an instructor in the University of Pennsylvania Medical School. He received a two-year fellowship at the ophthalmology division of the National Institute of Neurological Disease and Blindness (later the National Eye Institute). In 1968 he became NIH Special Fellow in Ophthalmic Pathology at the Armed Forces Institute of Pathology, where he worked under Lorenz E. Zimmerman.

In 1970, Albert was appointed Chief of the Eye Pathology Laboratory, Yale-New Haven Hospital, New Haven, Connecticut. He took up his first academic post at Yale University, where he taught from 1969 to 1975, rising to full professor at the Yale Medical School.

He then served as Associate Surgeon at the Massachusetts Eye and Ear Infirmary, Boston (1976–84), where he worked with David Cogan, and subsequently directed the hospital's David G. Cogan Eye Pathology Laboratory. He was Professor of Ophthalmology at Harvard University (1976–83) and held that university's David G. Cogan Professorship in Ophthalmology, an endowed chair (1983–92).

In 1992, Albert was appointed Chair in Ophthalmology in the Department of Ophthalmology and Visual Sciences of the University of Wisconsin, and the Frederick Allison Davis Professor of Ophthalmology at the University of Wisconsin Medical School. He also served as archivist of the University of Wisconsin School of Medicine and Public Health (from 2012). He was the founding Director of the University of Wisconsin's McPherson Eye Research Institute, a position he held for ten years.

In 2016, he moved to Portland, Oregon where, as of 2018, he serves as Professor of Ophthalmology at the Casey Eye Institute of Oregon Health & Science University.

Between 1970 and 1995, Albert additionally held visiting appointments in hospitals across the United States. In 1985, he spent a semester in London, England, where he was a visiting professor at the University of London and a visiting scientist at the Institute of Ophthalmology at Moorfields Eye Hospital. He has also been a guest lecturer in France, and Japan.

== Research ==
Albert's research has focused on ocular tumors, particularly melanoma and retinoblastoma.

Albert has published over 600 journal articles and he is the author or co-author of forty texts and monographs. The great majority of his published journal articles are in the field of ocular cancer. In 1963 among his first published articles were on melanoma: the first was published in Cancer Research and the second appeared in Archives of Ophthalmology.

== Editorial work ==
Albert served as Editor of the academic journals History of Ophthalmology (Documenta Ophthalmologica) (from 1994) and Archives of Ophthalmology (1994–2013). He has served on the editorial board of nine academic journals, including the Journal of the American Medical Association (JAMA) (1994–2013) and Ophthalmology (from 2014), as well as Dorland's Illustrated Medical Dictionary (from 1969).

With Frederick A. Jakobiec, Albert co-edited the textbook, Principles and Practices of Ophthalmology, which was first published in 1994 in six volumes, and remains in print in its third edition. In a review of the first edition for Archives of Ophthalmology, Bradley Straatsma wrote:

"This six-volume work provides a firm foundation for the acquisition of knowledge by the ophthalmologist-in-training and gives the ophthalmologist in practice an excellent platform for the acquisition of knowledge that is essential to present and future ophthalmic practice. This series is certain to be extremely useful to ophthalmologists at all levels of their professional careers, a highly useful addition to the collections of practice groups and institution, and an essential element in ophthalmic libraries."

He wrote a series of blog posts for the journal Science between 2009 and 2013, offering career advice to students considering a career in medicine.

== History of science and medicine ==
Albert has contributed to documenting the history of ophthalmology. During the late 1980s and early 1990s, he contributed introductory essays to 48 classics in the field of medicine for Gryphon Editions. He is the editor of Source Book of Ophthalmology (1995), a bibliographic guide to writings in the field. He has published several general guides to ocular history and famous ophthalmologists, including Men of Vision: Lives of Notable Figures in Ophthalmology (1993) and History of Ophthalmology (1996).

In 2014, with Sarah Atzen, he published the selected correspondence between William Shainline Middleton, a University of Pennsylvania-trained physician and Erwin Heinz Ackernecht, a German émigré whom he met at the University of Wisconsin and who became a distinguished medical historian.

Albert is a book collector and a member of the Grolier Club, focusing on books on the history of science and medicine. He donated several hundred books on this topic to the University of Wisconsin Library Special Collections and the University of Pennsylvania University Archives and Records Center and Kislak Center for Special Collections. He also collected ocular instruments, particularly antique spectacles and ophthalmoscopes. He amassed a large collection of historical medical lecture admission tickets, now in the University of Pennsylvania Archives, catalogued in his book, Tickets to the Healing Arts: Medical Lecture Tickets of the 18th and 19th Centuries (2015). He donated his medical instrument collections, books, trade cards and ephemera to the Kislak Center.

== Awards, honors and professional activities ==
Albert was given an honorary MA from the Harvard Medical School in 1976; eight years later, he was conferred with the degree Doctor Honoris Causa, from the Université Louis Pasteur in Strasbourg, France. He received the Best Medical Book Award for the 1994 edition of Principles and Practice of Ophthalmology from the Association of American Publishers. In 2001, he received the University of Pennsylvania School of Medicine's Distinguished Graduate Award. In 2008, he was recognized with the creation of The Daniel M. Albert Professorship in Visual Sciences, established by the University of Wisconsin School of Medicine and Public Health. In 2010 he received the Life Achievement Honor Award of the American Academy of Ophthalmology and the following year, was named Laureate of the Academy, the society's highest honor. He has received numerous other awards, including the Albert C. Muse Prize, Association for Research in Vision and Ophthalmology's Friedenwald Award, Humboldt Research Award, American Ophthalmological Society's Lucien Howe Medal, Pisart Vision Award and the American Association of Ocular Pathologists' Zimmerman Medal.

Albert is a member of the Association For Research in Vision and Ophthalmology (from 1962), the American Medical Association (from 1963), and the American Ophthalmological Society (from 1973). In 1985, he was appointed to the Executive Committee of the Collaborative Ocular Melanoma Study. He directed the American Board of Ophthalmology (1997–2005). He served as president of the American Ophthalmological Society (2005–6).

== Selected bibliography ==
Research articles

Bibliography of Scientific Articles

- Stephen H. Friend, Rene Bernards, Snezna Rogelj, Robert A. Weinberg, Joyce M. Rapaport, Daniel M. Albert, Thaddeus P. Dryja. (1986) A human DNA segment with properties of the gene that predisposes to retinoblastoma and osteosarcoma. Nature 323, 643–46 (highest-cited research paper, with 3154 citations in Google Scholar)

Monographs and textbooks

- Albert Daniel M. and Harold Scheie. A History of Ophthalmology at the University of Pennsylvania. Springfield, Ill.: C.C. Thomas 1965.
- Albert, Daniel M. and Eduard von Jaeger. Jaeger's Atlas of Diseases of the Ocular Fundus: With New Descriptions, Revisions and Additions. Philadelphia and London: W.B. Saunders, 1972.
- Albert, Daniel, M and Paul Henkind. Men of Vision: Lives of Notable Figures in Ophthalmology. Philadelphia: Saunders, 1993. Classics of Ophthalmology Library Series.
- Albert, Daniel M. Frederick A. Jakobiec, Eds. Principles and Practice of Ophthalmology. 6 vols. Philadelphia: Saunders, 1994.
- Albert, Daniel M, Edward W.D. Norton, and Reva Hurtes. Source Book of Ophthalmology. Cambridge, Mass.: Blackwell Science, 1995.
- Albert, Daniel M. and Diane D. Edwards. The History of Ophthalmology. Cambridge, Mass.: Blackwell Science, 1996.
- Albert, Daniel M. and Frederick A. Jakobiec, Eds. Atlas of Clinical Ophthalmology. Philadelphia, Saunders, 2000. 2nd Ed.
- Albert, Daniel M. and Arthur Polans. Ocular Oncology. New York: Marcel Dekker, 2003.
- Albert, Daniel M. & Mark J. Lucarelli, Eds. Clinical Atlas of Procedures in Ophthalmic and Oculofacial Surgery. New York: Oxford University Press, 2012. 2nd Ed.
- Albert, Daniel M. The Dean and the Historian: Their Lives and Times Through Letters. Philadelphia: Perelman School of Medicine, University of Pennsylvania, 2014.
- Albert, Daniel M. and Carol Benenson Perloff. Tickets to the Healing Arts: Medical Lecture Tickets of the 18th and 19th Centuries. New Castle, DE and Philadelphia: Oak Knoll Press and University of Pennsylvania Archives, 2015.
- Scheie, Harold and Daniel M. Albert. Textbook of Ophthalmology. Philadelphia: Saunders, 1977. 9th ed.
