= Heart of Stone (2009 film) =

Documentray film from 2009

- Directed by: Beth Toni Kruvant
- Release date: 2009
- Language: English

Heart of Stone is a 2009 documentary film about Weequahic High School in Newark, New Jersey, United States, directed by Beth Toni Kruvant, with Zach Braff serving as executive producer. The film relates the struggles of Principal Ron Stone and the rest of the school's administration, plus students and alumni to return the school, working with African American and Jewish alumni, to its previous glory in the years before the 1967 Newark riots.

== The film ==
The film documents Weequahic High School, which graduated some of the top students in the country after opening in 1932 and was "known as one of the top schools in America before 1960", with graduates such as novelist Philip Roth. By 2000, the school had disintegrated into a breeding ground for gang violence. The New York Times described the film as having the potential to be an ordinary story of a hard-nosed principal facing down gang members, but the film actually tells the inspiring portrait of a bold principal who works with gang leaders and Jewish and African American alumni to give his students a hopeful future. Heart of Stone focuses on the crisis in education in Newark as an example for the entire nation, showing how an alumni group raised $400,000 with one of its co-founders being Hal Braff, the attorney father of actor Zach Braff.

The film's title comes from the school principal's last name, but also the director's belief that a heart of stone was needed to face the difficult challenge of earning the respect of the school's students, many of whom are gang members. Stone's strategy was not to confront the gangbangers but to make use of their "natural leadership abilities" and to use their skills to help improve themselves and their school and to help end the pattern of violence in the school building.

== Critical responses ==
The film premiered at the Slamdance Film Festival where it won the Audience Award. It also won the Jury Award for Best Documentary at Cinequest Film Festival, and received the Kaiser Permanente Thrive Award for telling a story of thriving in the face of adversity. The film won the Best Feature Film at the Philadelphia Film Festival and the Best Documentary Film at the New Jersey Film Festival and Urban Suburban Film Festival. Heart of Stone had its theatrical premiere at The Roxie in San Francisco on October 30, 2009. It aired on Showtime, The Movie Channel, VOD and PBS.

== Director ==
Kruvant, a native of Montclair, New Jersey, also directed the documentary Unsung Treasure about American musician David Bromberg, which opened the Woodstock Film Festival 2012 and premiered on PBS, Born in Buenos Aires about the Argentine Jewish community during the political and fiscal crisis of 2001, and The Right to Be Wrong chronicles an Israeli and Palestinian friendship.Kruvant directed Levinsky Park about an Eritrean Christian and Sudanese Muslim life in their refuge country of Israel. Her latest film in 2024 Finding Fate is a short that documents four mothers in Poland after Russian invasion of Ukraine in 2022. The film appeared on PBS nationwide in 2024 and 2025. It is streaming on PBS.org. All of Kruvant's films can be accessed through www.goodfootageproductions.com
