= Victor Parsonnet =

American cardiac surgeon (1924–2024)

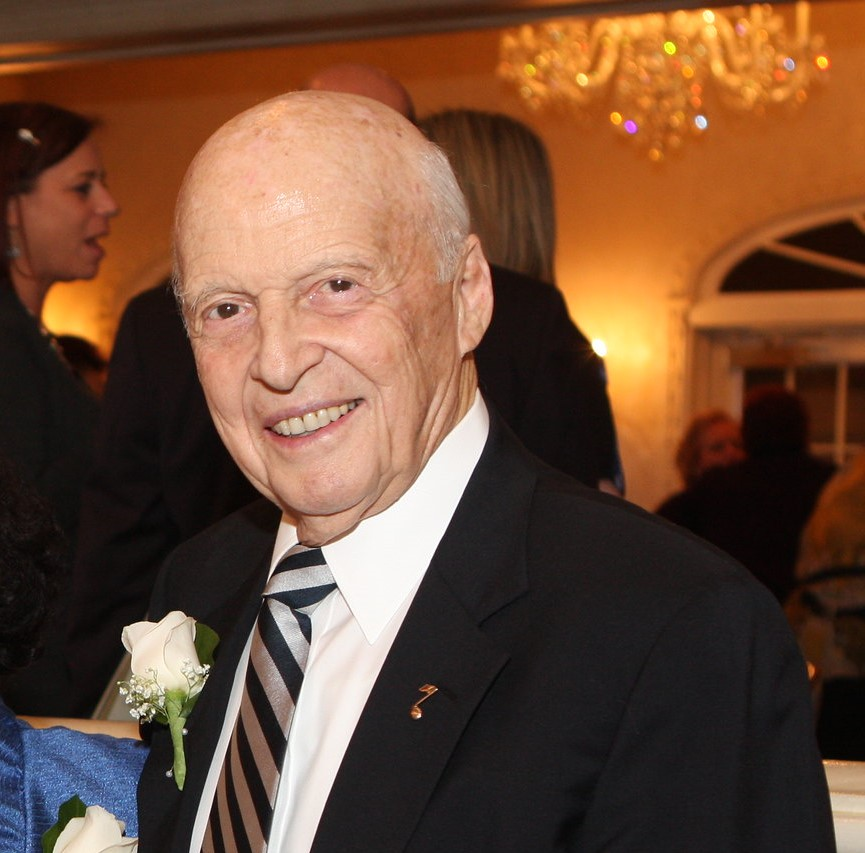
- Born: August 29, 1924; Newark, New Jersey, U.S.
- Died: December 23, 2024 (aged 100)
- Occupation: Cardiac surgeon

Victor Parsonnet (August 29, 1924 – December 23, 2024) was an American cardiac surgeon who contributed significantly to the evolution of cardiac pacemaking.

== Life and career ==
Parsonnet grew up in Newark, New Jersey and attended Weequahic High School before enrolling at Cornell University. He joined the U.S. Navy Reserve during World War II and then went on to medical school. In 1947 he finished his medical studies at New York University School of Medicine.

In 1955, Parsonnet joined his father's practice at Newark Beth Israel Medical Center, in Newark, New Jersey, which his grandfathers, Max Danzis and Victor Parsonnet, co-founded in 1901. Parsonnet conducted research and studied with pioneers of the heart surgery field, Michael DeBakey and Denton Cooley (the first person in the United States to perform a heart transplant in 1968). Parsonnet was the first surgeon in New Jersey to implant a permanent pacemaker (1961) and to complete a heart transplant (1985) and kidney transplant. When asked about his success, he simply says, "I was in the right place at the right time".

At Beth Israel, Parsonnet served as Chief of Surgery at Beth Israel, Medical director of the Pacemaker and Defibrillator Evaluation Center and director of Surgical Research.

Parsonnet, helped co-found the North American Society of Pacing and Electrophysiology. He has authored over 600 articles and 5 books. He also held five patents.

In the community, Parsonnet served as chair of the New Jersey Symphony Orchestra for many years. He also has been a board member at the Jewish Community Foundation of Greater MetroWest NJ and a board member of the Jewish Historical Society of New Jersey.

Parsonnet retired in 2016. In 2019, he was inducted into the New Jersey Hall of Fame. He turned 100 on August 29, 2024, and died December 23.

== See also ==
- List of surgeons
- List of people from Newark, New Jersey
