= Clinton Township, Essex County, New Jersey =

Coordinates: 40.744°N 74.265°W

Historical population
Census	Pop.	Note	%±
1840	1,976		—
1850	2,508		26.9%
1860	3,659		45.9%
1870	2,240	*	−38.8%
1880	2,742		22.4%
1890	3,684		34.4%
1900	1,325	*	−64.0%
Population sources: 1840-1900 1840 1850-1870; 1850 1870 1880-1890 * = Lost territory in previous decade.

Clinton Township was a township located in Essex County, New Jersey, United States, which existed from 1834 to 1902.

Clinton Township was created on April 14, 1834, from portions of Elizabeth Township, Newark Township, Orange Township and Union Township. Clinton Township included present-day Irvington and Maplewood and parts of Newark and South Orange.

On April 1, 1861, South Orange Township (now Maplewood) was formed from portions of Clinton Township and Orange.

Irvington was formed as an independent village as of March 27, 1874, and became fully independent as a town on March 2, 1898. The town's Clinton Cemetery, opened in 1844, refers to the earlier name.

What remained of the old township was absorbed into Newark on March 5, 1902, based on the results of a referendum held on March 11, 1902. The area is now part of the Clinton Hill neighborhood of Newark.
