= Dayton, Newark =

Populated place in Essex County, New Jersey, US

Coordinates: 40°42′18″N 74°12′27″W

Dayton is a neighborhood within the city of Newark in Essex County, in the U.S. state of New Jersey. It is part of the city's south ward.

== History ==
The neighborhood is named after Jonathan Dayton (October 16, 1760 – October 9, 1824), an American politician from the U.S. state of New Jersey and founding father of the United States He was the youngest person to sign the United States Constitution and a member of the U.S. House of Representatives, serving as the fourth Speaker of the United States House of Representatives, and later the U.S. Senate.

Dayton was also known for Twin City, a skating rink located on the Newark-Elizabeth border in the area of Virginia Street. St. Thomas Aquinas RC Church is located on Ludlow Street.

== Geography ==
The area is bounded on the north by Peddie Street (for Thomas Baldwin Peddie), on the east by Newark Liberty International Airport, on the south by Elizabeth, and on the west by Elizabeth Avenue. The main road through the neighborhood is Frelinghuysen Avenue, but it is surrounded by U.S. Route 1/9, Interstate 78 and U.S. Route 22. Newark City Cemetery and Mount Olivet Cemetery lie at its eastern edge.

Weequahic Park, at the neighborhood's western side, is the second largest park in Newark. It includes an 80-acre (320,000 m^{2}) lake, Weequahic Golf Course and an old racetrack now used for jogging. It is bisected by US 22 and the larger, southern section of the park (including Weequahic Lake) is easily accessible to Dayton.

== Transportation ==
There is one train station in Dayton, Newark Liberty International Airport, served by New Jersey Transit's Northeast Corridor Line and North Jersey Coast Line, and Amtrak's Northeast Regional and Keystone Service. The station was built in 2001 to connect NJT's commuter lines and Amtrak's Northeast Corridor services with the airport's AirTrain system. It opened four years after service was run between terminals on the AirTrain. The station is only a transfer station and not publicly accessible by any roads. In 2024 the Port Authority of New York and New Jersey, which owns and operates the station, announced that the station would be expanded to include street access via New Jersey Route 27 (Frelinghuysen Avenue) as well as other facilities for bus service, parking, and drop-off area.

A proposal to extend PATH service to the airport may include a station at Dayton.

== Lionsgate Newark ==
In 2022, the city announced that a major new film and television production studio overlooking Weequahic Park and Weequahic Golf Course, to be called Lionsgate Newark Studios would open in 2024 on the 15-acre former Seth Boyden housing projects site at 101 Center Terrace in the Dayton section near Evergreen Cemetery. Lionsgate Newark will partner on public relations and community affairs with the New Jersey Performing Arts Center.
