= Weequahic Park =

- Weequahic Park Historic District
- U.S. National Register of Historic Places
- New Jersey Register of Historic Places
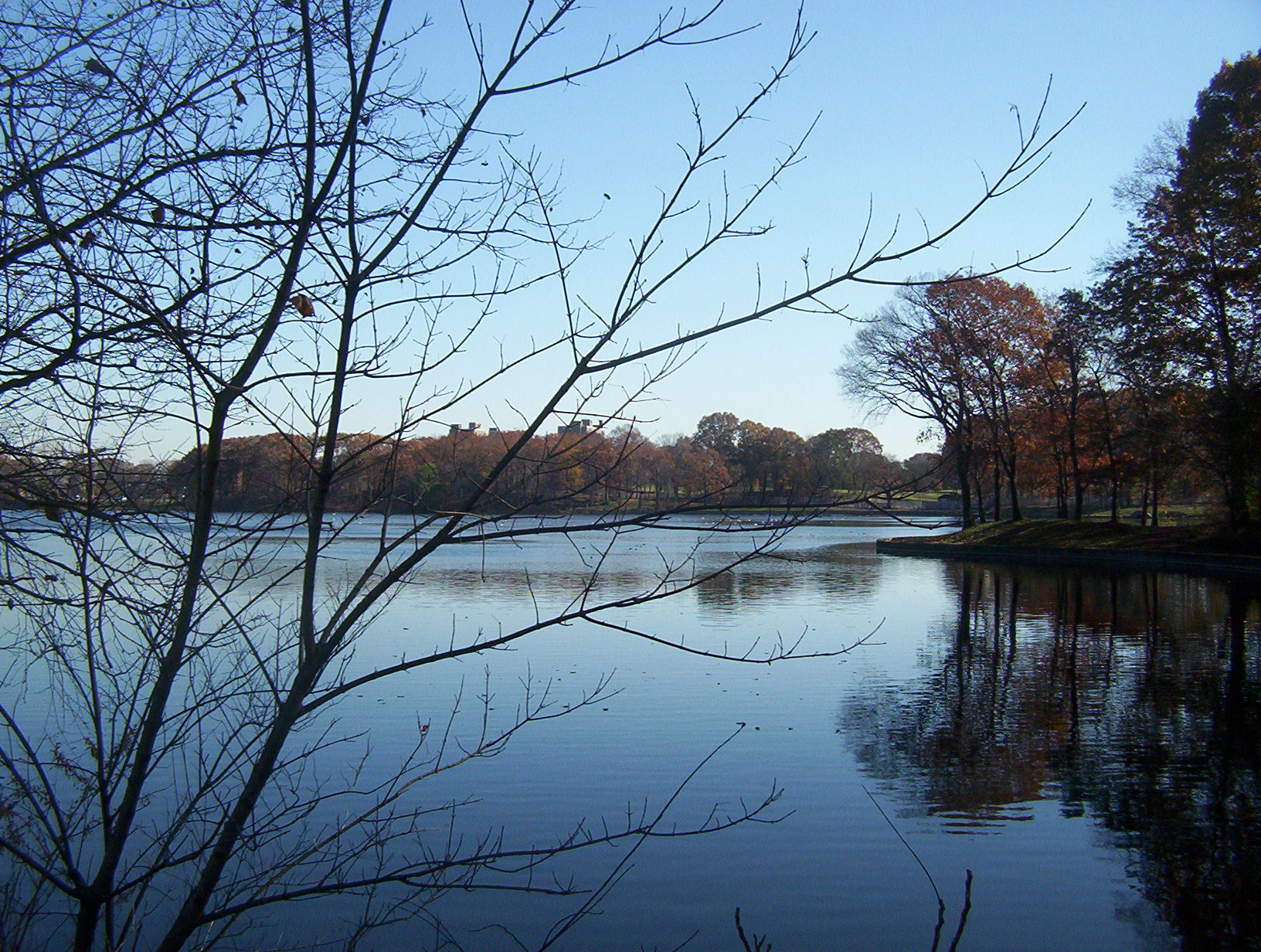
- Weequahic Lake

- Location within Essex County, New Jersey Location within New Jersey Location within the United States
- Location: Roughly bounded by Meeker Avenue, Dayton Street, Elizabeth Avenue, Union County border,
- Coordinates: 40°42′6″N 74°12′19″W
- Area: 436 acres (176 ha)
- NRHP reference No.: 03000013
- NJRHP No.: 4115

Significant dates
- Added to NRHP: February 12, 2003
- Designated NJRHP: December 12, 2002

Weequahic Park (/wiːˈkweɪɪk/; pronounced Wee-QUAY-ic, or WEEK-wake "when spoken rapidly") is a park located in the South Ward of Newark, New Jersey, US, designed by the Olmsted Brothers firm, (who also designed Branch Brook Park in Newark). The park is 311.33 acres including an 80-acre (320,000 m^{2}) lake. The Weequahic Park Historic District was added to the National Register of Historic Places on February 12, 2003, for its significance in architecture, community planning, and landscape architecture.

In the early 2020s, following upgrades, Weequahic Park began serving as the home game site for the Rutgers University Scarlet Raiders baseball team.

The East Coast Greenway runs through the park. West of Weequahic Park is Weequahic, a middle-class residential neighborhood. East of Weequahic Park is the Dayton section of the city (the park itself as well is in the Dayton section) and Newark Airport.

== History ==
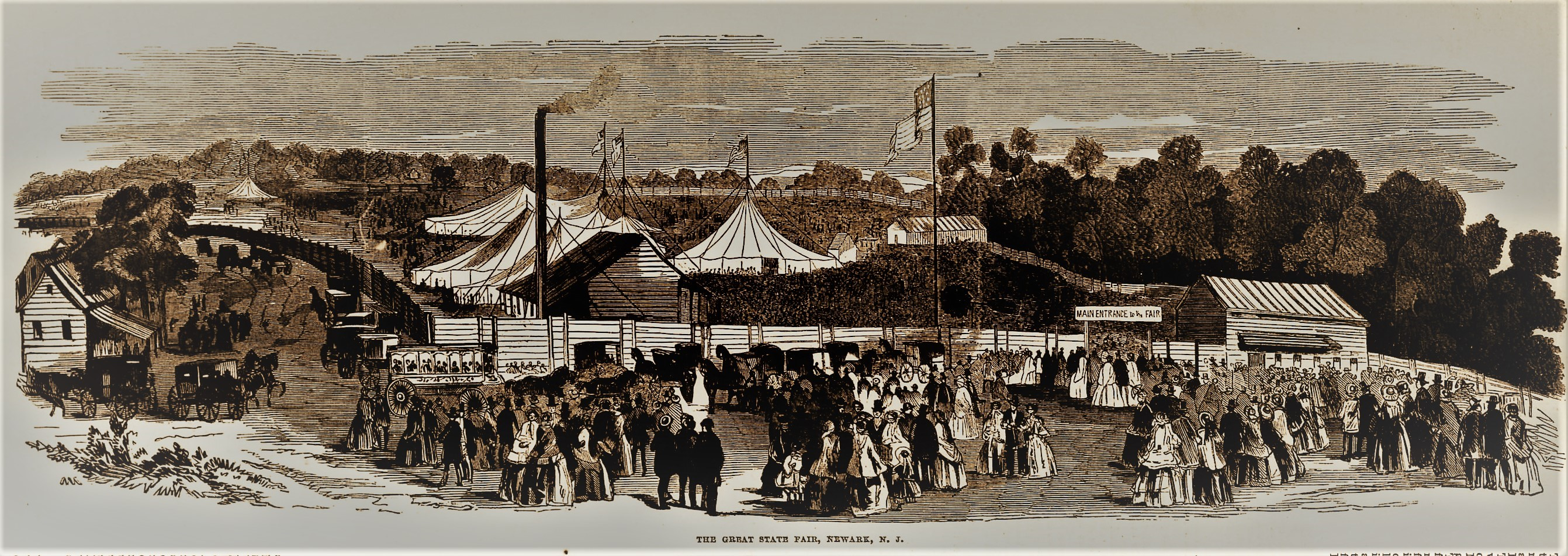
"The Great State Fair, Newark, N.J." from Frank Leslie's Illustrated Newspaper (September 27, 1856). This illustration depicts what is now Weequahic Park during the New Jersey Agricultural Fair.

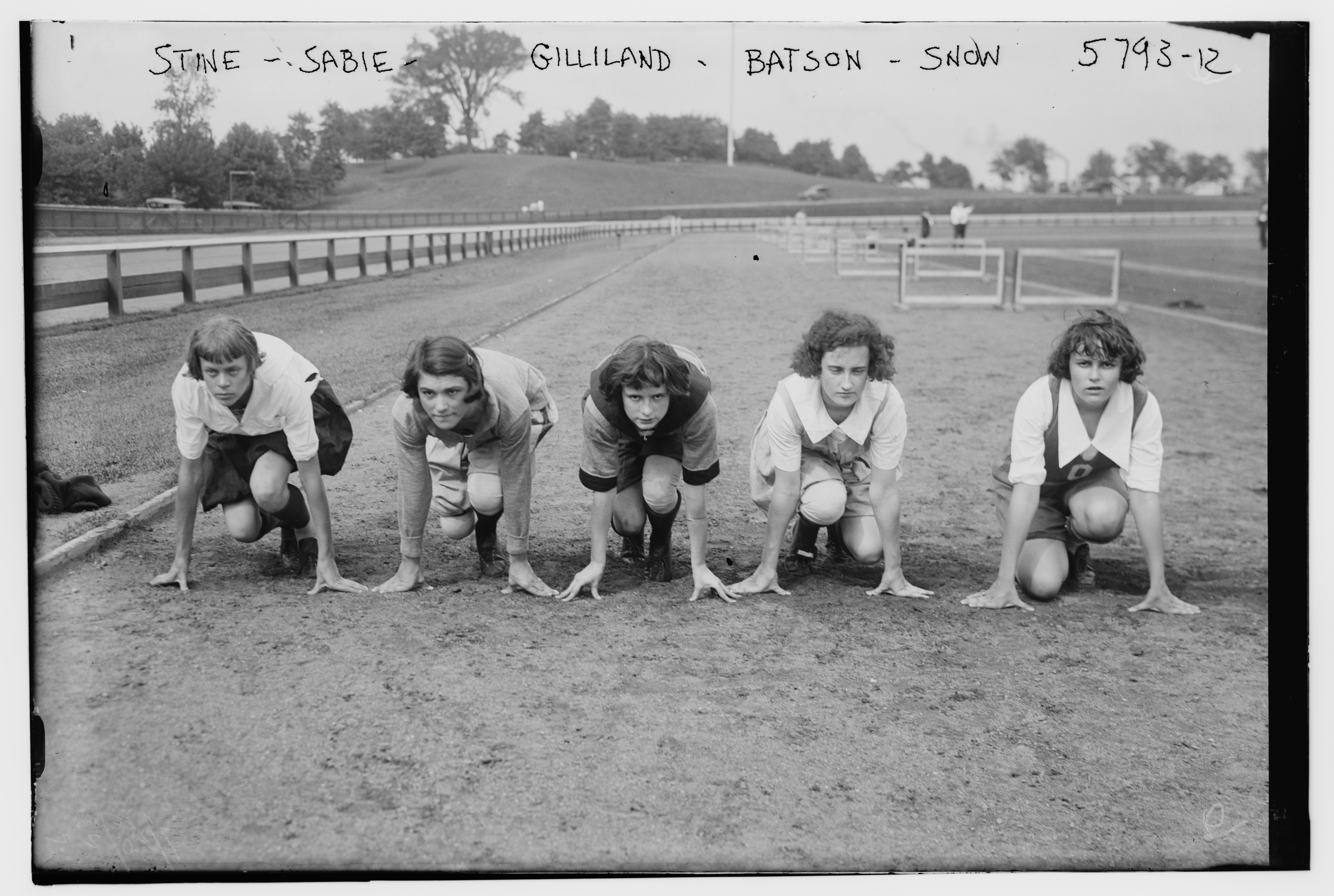
The U.S. women's track team practicing in Weequahic Park for the 1922 Women's World Games

The park opened on what had been the Waverly Fairgrounds. The word "Weequahic" is from the Lenni-Lenape Native American term for "head of the cove." Tradition holds that the spring-fed lake in the park (once a cove) stood as the boundary between the Raritan and Hackensack bands of Lenape Indians.

Romani "gypsies" had several seasonal campsites in the area during the era of the Waverly Agricultural Fair in the 19th century. Many Romani are buried in adjacent Evergreen Cemetery.

In 1896, the Essex County Park Commission purchased a 28-acre tract of land in the area of James Jay Mapes's famous experimental farm. By 1899, a total of 265 acres of saltwater wetland surrounded by open farmland and steep wooded slopes had been acquired, and what was then called Weequahic Reservation was established.

In 1923, the park hosted the first American Track & Field championships for women.

Philip Roth describes the park in The Plot Against America, set in the Weequahic section of Newark where Roth grew up.

== Feldman Middleton Jr. Community Center ==
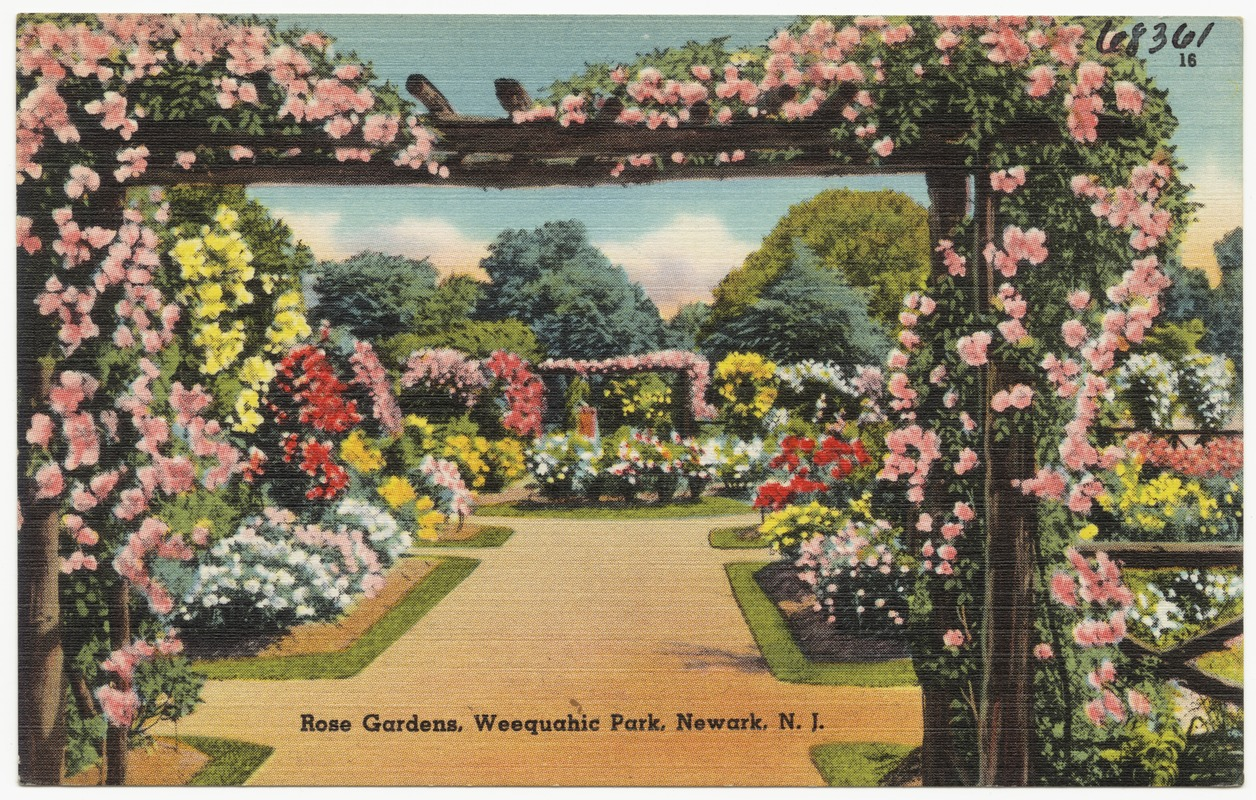
Rose gardens behind the tennis courts in Weequahic Park in the early part of the 20th century

In 2021, a new community center opened in the park, called the "crown jewel" of the South Ward at its ribbon-cutting by Governor Phil Murphy, with a 100-foot-long patio for outdoor seating and office space for the two primary Newark community groups that support the park, Weequahic Park Sports Authority and Weequahic Park Association.

The center is also available for rental from the county for parties and events, with a 100-guest maximum. Meeting space in the center for community organizations is also available by permit.

== Park conservancies ==
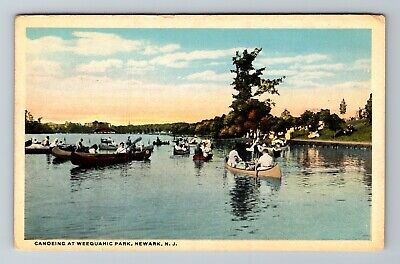
Boating in Weequahic Lake

=== Weequahic Park Association ===
The Weequahic Park Association is a non-profit volunteer organization dedicated to improving and beautifying the park. It was founded in 1992 by a group of local long-distance runners who helped produce the red rubberized 2.2 mile trail around the lake formerly known as the Weequahic Lake Trail and now known as the McNeil Path. In 1995, it was the first park conservancy in New Jersey to enter into a partnership agreement with a county. Its offices are located in the Feldman Middleton Jr. Community Center.

=== Weequahic Park Sports Authority Conservancy ===
The Weequahic Park Sports Authority Conservancy (WPSAC) is a nonprofit community-based organization founded in 2012, dedicated to the revitalization of Weequahic Park and the empowerment of the surrounding South Ward community in Newark, New Jersey. The Conservancy focuses on public service, recreational programming, and environmental stewardship, serving as a grassroots catalyst for park restoration and youth development.

Operating with limited initial funding, WPSAC has relied heavily on sweat equity, volunteerism, seasonal staffing, and collaborative partnerships to implement its initiatives. Its efforts include organizing sports programs, park clean-up events, and public safety campaigns, often in partnership with Essex County, local schools, law enforcement agencies, and environmental groups. The Conservancy has played a key role in reactivating underused areas of the park and advocating for equitable access to safe and sustainable public space.

== Wilbur J. McNeil Walking Path ==
A rubberized loop trail encircles Weequahic Lake in the park, snaking around its edges. A former bridle trail, the red rubberized trail is 2.2 miles long, said to be the longest resilient-surfaced track in the world. The red trail surface is made from 100% post-consumer recycled rubber.

In 2025, the trail was renamed from Weequahic Lake Trail to the Essex County Wilbur J. McNeil Walking Path in honor of the founder of the Weequahic Park Association.

== Weequahic Lake ==
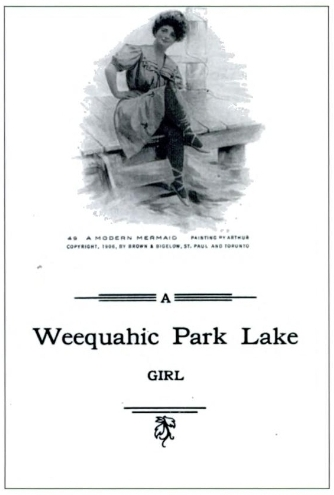
A postcard, "A Weequahic Park Lake Girl," as reprinted in Jews of Weequahic (2008). The caption to the art reads "49. A Modern Mermaid. Painting by Arthur. Copyright, 1906, by Brown & Bigelow, St. Paul and Toronto.

Two brooks and several springs feed into 80-acre (320,000 m^{2}) Weequahic Lake, a natural body of water deepened by a dam.

=== History of the lake ===
The Olmsted Brothers drafted pIans for converting the existing spring-fed boggy wetlands into a recreationaI lake. Their plans recommended dredging the lake to a depth of 12 feet or to a depth sufficient to prevent vegetative growth, while maintaining the original shoreline. The dredging cost was deemed too expensive, however. Instead, in 1903, a dam was built across the northern end of the lake to arrest the flow of Bound Creek from Newark Bay, causing the water level to rise and creating the depth now seen in the lake.

=== Fishing at Weequahic Park Lake ===
Fishing is popular in Weequahic Lake. Kinds of fish reported in Weequahic Lake include: largemouth bass; channel catfish; Northern brown bullhead; yellow perch; white perch; bluegill; black crappie; pumpkinseed; golden shiner; Eurasian carp; killifish; and goldfish.

== The Rev. Ronald B. Christian Recreation Complex ==
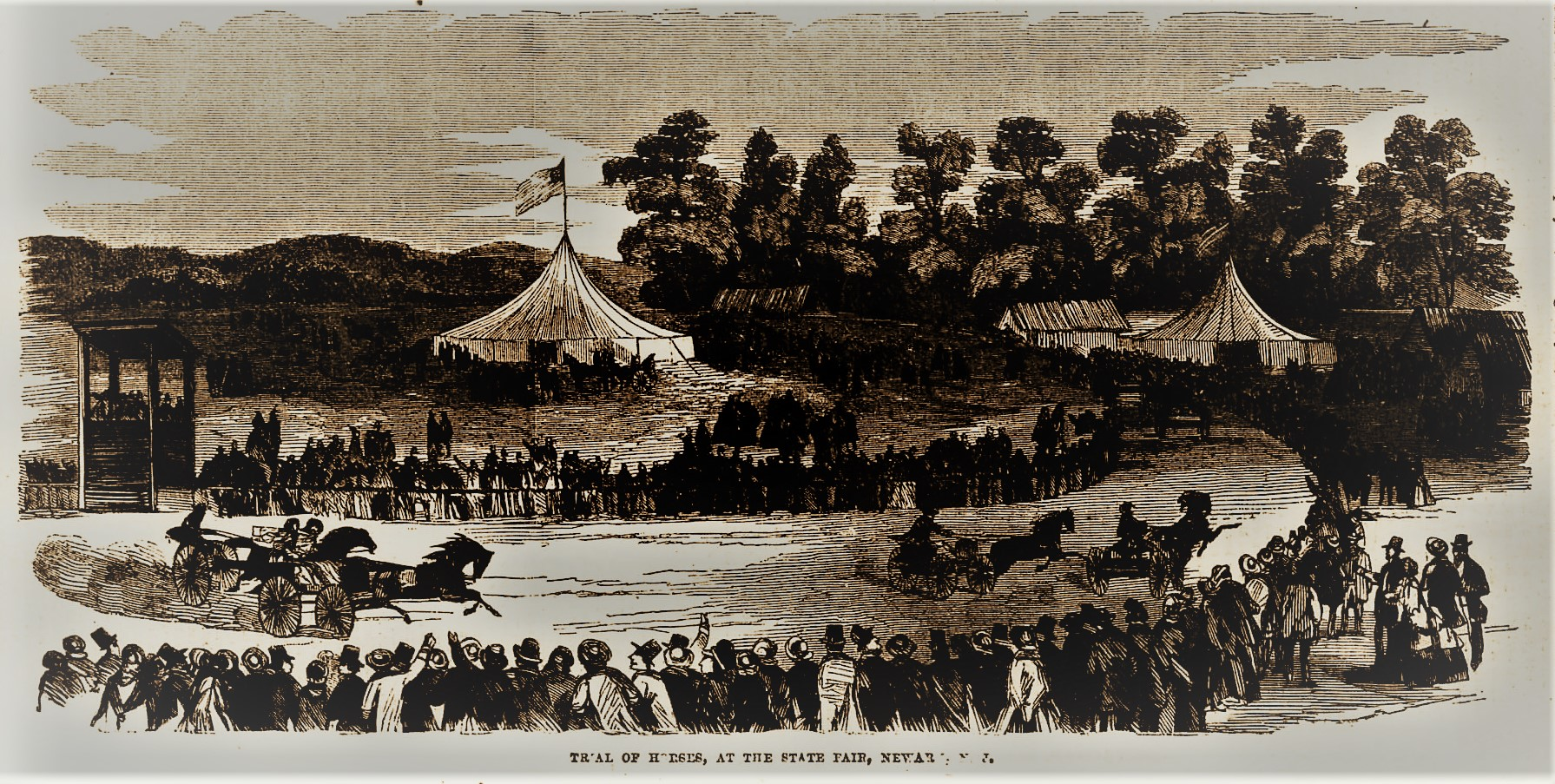
"Trial of Horses, at the State Fair, Newark, N.J." from Frank Leslie's Illustrated Newspaper (September 27, 1856). This depicts harness racing at what is now the oval walking path in Weequahic Park during the first annual state fair in Newark NJ

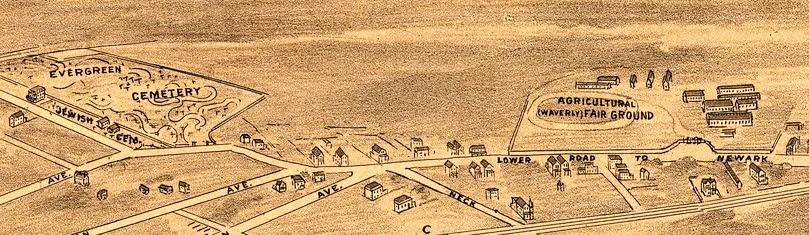
What is now a half-mile oval walking path around the athletic complex was known as the Waverly Racing Oval in 1898.

What is now the oval-shaped Rev. Ronald B. Christian Recreation Complex, south of the lake, was originally a half-mile racing oval built around or before the 1850s for equestrian competition at the Waverly Fair. This "Waverly Racing Oval" was home to cycling and horse races during the 19th and first half of the 20th century. President Ulysses S. Grant attended the horse races at the site in 1872. The racing oval is now a half-mile walking loop and, inside the oval, modern amenities such as a football field, a modern 400-meter athletic track, and two softball fields are now located as part of the Rev. Ronald B. Christian Recreation Complex.

== Divident Hill pavilion ==
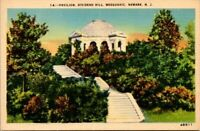
Divident Hill pavilion as it looked in the 1920s

A visual feature of Weequahic Park, along with the Weequahic Golf Course, is the miniature Roman-style stone temple serving as the park's gazebo and pavilion on Divident Hill. It was placed to mark the local hill where, on May 20, 1668, Robert Treat and other commissioners of the town of Newark met with the commissioners of Elizabeth-town to fix the boundaries between the settlements. "Divident Hill" is not a typographical error; rather, "divident" is simply an old-fashioned term for "divided". The hill is also called "Bound-Hill". The hill was said to have had significance to the Lenni Lenape Native Americans, as it lay at the border between the Hackensack and Raritan bands of Lenape.

On that date and on that hill, the founders of Newark and Elizabeth entered "a religious covenant ... to protect their generation and 1,000 generations to come".

The gazebo was designed by the famed Beaux Arts design firm Carrère and Hastings for Newark's 250th anniversary in 1916.

Advocates from non-profit conservancy groups, along with the Newark Environmental Commission and local spiritual leaders, began advocating for the pavilion's restoration to its former glory in 2018.

The Elizabeth Avenue Children's Building was also constructed in 1916. In 1924 the Governor Franklin Murphy Monument sculpted by J. Massey Rhind was unveiled in the northeast area of the park.

== Weequahic Golf Course ==
At the western edge of the park lies the Weequahic Golf Course, the oldest public golf course in the state.

== See also ==
- National Register of Historic Places listings in Essex County, New Jersey
