= Weequahic Golf Course =

Golf course in Newark, New Jersey, United States

Coordinates: 40°41′53″N 74°12′41″W

Weequahic Golf Course (pronounced wee-KWAY-ik) is an 18-hole public course located in the Dayton neighborhood of Newark, New Jersey.

Weequahic is the oldest public golf course in New Jersey; the first nine holes were designed in 1913 by George Low, with the course opening for play in 1914. The course was expanded to 18 holes in 1969.

The word "Weequahic" is from the Lenni-Lenape Native American term for "head of the cove". The course sits next to the 311 acre (1.3 km²) Olmsted Brothers-designed Weequahic Park, which features a 2.2-mile rubberized jogging path around its 80-acre (324,000 m²) lake. It is also adjacent to Evergreen Cemetery, an American cemetery and located at 1137 North Broad Street, Hillside.

The course was home to golf pro legend Wiley Williams, who was one of the first African-American golfers to win a major New Jersey golf event and worked to introduce city youth to the sport. Williams died on December 26, 2024. The course is also home to the First Tee Program of Essex County which teaches youth to golf.

The course was described in 2016 by the Golf Channel as a "hidden gem."
